= Orange Leaf Frozen Yogurt =

American frozen yogurt retail chain

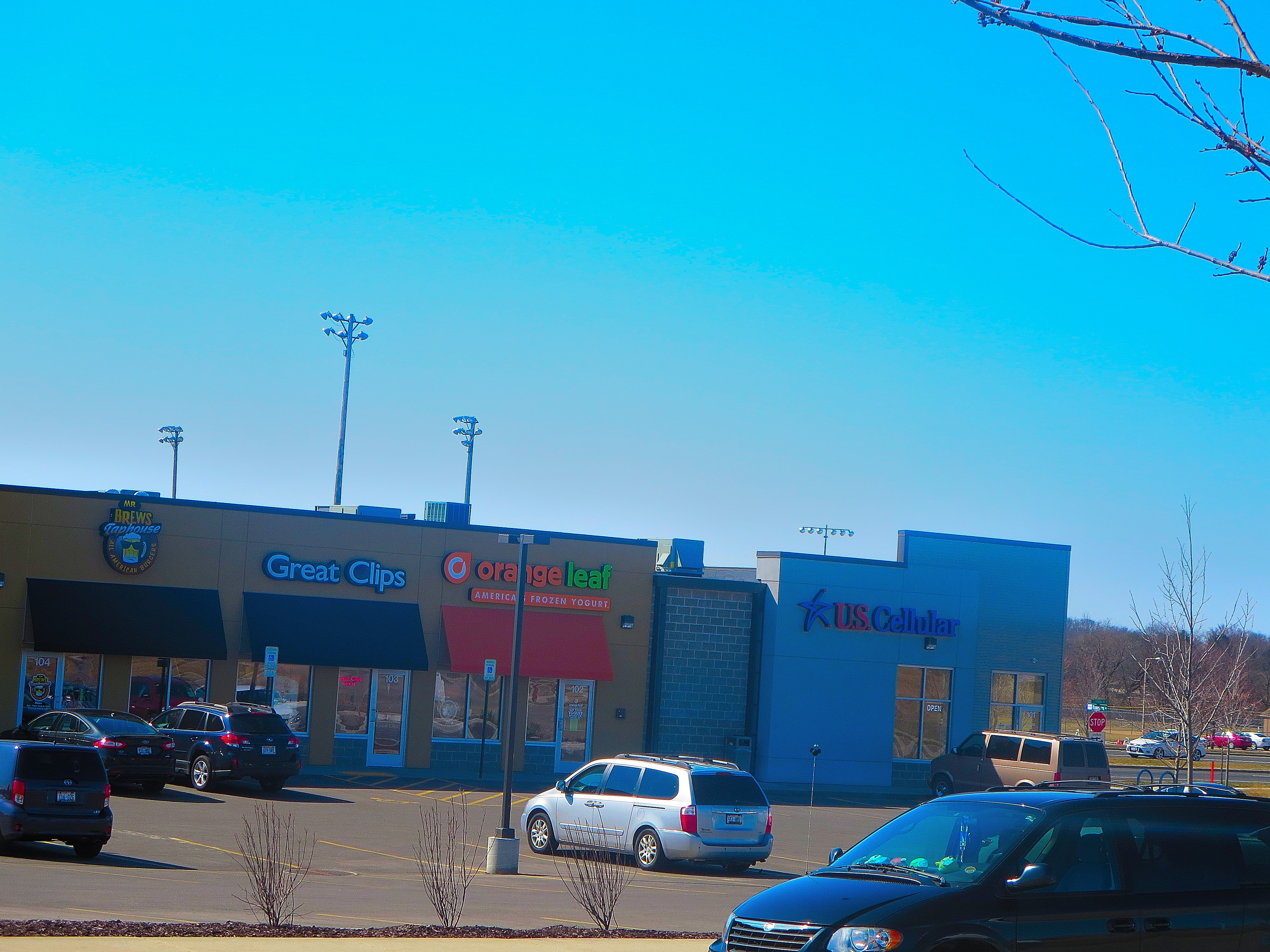
- Orange Leaf Frozen Yogurt franchise shown
- Type: Private
- Industry: Franchised chain restaurant
- Founded: 2008
- Headquarters: Oklahoma City, Oklahoma, United States
- Area served: Contiguous United States (2008–present); Australia (2011–present); China (planned in 2014, never came to fruition)
- Key people: Kendall Ware (President and COO)
- Products: Frozen yogurt
- Owner: Mike Liddell
- Website: orangeleafyogurt.com

Orange Leaf Frozen Yogurt (or simply Orange Leaf) is an Oklahoma City-based chain of self-serve frozen yogurt franchises. Founded in 2008, it has spread to over 300 locations in the United States and has also expanded internationally.

== History ==
Previously known as Orange Tree Frozen Yogurt, it was founded in 2008. Mike Liddell and Reese Travis noticed a franchise was doing good business in Edmond, Oklahoma. They purchased a franchise in 2009, and Liddell purchased the company in 2010. Liddell then moved the company from California to Oklahoma, hired Travis as CEO, and changed the name to Orange Leaf.

In April 2011, it had 63 stores open in the United States, and it expanded to 111 locations in September 2011. As of October 2013, it had over 300 locations (by 2017 that number had reduced to less than 210 locations), and it planned an IPO in 2015.

Frostee Rucker and John Calipari have invested in franchises.

In 2014, an Indiana-based franchisee had filed a suit in federal court in Indianapolis that "Orange Leaf misled him and made false statements about store revenue to coerce him into opening shops outside of Indiana—in Illinois, Florida, and Tennessee." Orange Tree had filled a counter suit claiming breach of contract. In January 2018, Orange Leaf named Kendall Ware the President and COO.

== International locations ==
Orange Leaf opened its first international franchise, located in Australia, in 2011 in Melbourne. By the end of 2013, there were three locations in the state of Victoria plus one at Bondi Beach, in Sydney. As of September 2015, there are four locations in the states of Victoria and one location in New South Wales.

In 2014, CNBC reported that it has expanded into Asian markets, including China. Although it was announced in May 2014 that two stores were going to open soon in the Chinese city of Shanghai, no stores have open on the Asian continent as of September 2015, and it appears the plans were ultimately cancelled.

== Stores ==
The stores are self-serve. They offer sugar-free, gluten-free, non-dairy, and vegan alternatives. The Oklahoman described the stores as "living rooms that happen to have yogurt dispensers".

Despite the chain's massive expansion campaign during the early-to-mid 2010s, by the end of the decade many of those locations had already closed, often after just a couple years of operation.

== See also ==
- List of frozen yogurt companies
- TCBY
- Yogurtland
