= Snog (company) =

- Snog store in Soho, London (2016)
- Type: Private
- Industry: Chain restaurant Franchise
- Founded: London, United Kingdom, in 2008; 18 years ago
- Founder: Pablo Uribe, Tristan Pestana and Rob Baines
- Number of locations: 10 in London
- Area served: United Kingdom, Asia, South America
- Products: Frozen yogurt Toppings

Snog (stylised as SNOG) is a British frozen yoghurt company. Founded in 2008 by a group of shareholders, its first store opened in South Kensington on 22 May 2008 and at its peak had 10 stores in London. Frozen yoghurt was particularly popular in the UK in late 2000s to early 2010s and it became popular again in 2026. Snog sells frozen yoghurt made from organic ingredients and offers a range of toppings, in addition to milkshakes. Snog was the first of its kind in the UK and also had stores open in Asia and South America. In 2014, mini frozen yoghurt pots under the Snog brand were released in UK supermarkets in three of its most popular flavours. Snog's products have been considered a healthy alternative to ice cream. Snog has been well received by critics, who have commented on its healthy ingredients, the design of its cafes, its name and its slogan.

== Background ==
Frozen yoghurt – also known as Froyo – is an American concept. In the United Kingdom, it was considered a big trend in the late 2000s to early 2010s, particularly in London. As a healthy alternative to ice cream, it was considered a health food and started to compete with ice cream and other desserts. However, the craze had died by the end of the 2010s due to Market over-saturation, the natural cycle of declining trends and consumers' realisation that it may not be as healthy as they thought. In 2026, it became popular again because of its perception of being a healthier dessert, in addition to social media and nostalgia, including the social media trend "2026 is the new 2016". In 2025, Market Data Forecast estimated that the European frozen yoghurt market was worth £419,000,000, and it grew to £434,000,000 in 2026.

Snog products consists of British and organic ingredients for its products; they are made with organic milk, yoghurt and sweetened agave (rather than sugar) and are Fat free. The original snog flavour was reported to be 140 calories in 2015. Other flavours of the frozen yoghurt include milk chocolate, mango and green tea. The frozen yoghurts come in various sizes that can be chosen by customers, and they have various toppings that can be added, including strawberries, chocolates, gluten free chocolate fudge brownies, marshmallows, mochi, gummy bears and granola. Sauce can be added without extra cost, in addition to a bit of milk. None of the toppings include sweeteners, preservatives or artificial colouring. Snog also sells its own milkshakes. One of Snog's slogans is "Snog your heart out". The employees of the chain wear a teal polo shirt which has Snog's logo on it.

== History ==
Snog was founded in London May 2008 by several shareholders, including Pablo Uribe, Tristan Pestana and Rob Baines, the latter of whom was the CEO in 2012. Anna Ghee was reported to be CEO in 2014 and 2016. The shareholders who created the company noticed a gap in the market for a frozen and healthy dessert amid the popularity of smoothies and juice bars. Snog was the first of its kind in the United Kingdom. The name "Snog" is derived from "snow & yogurt". Uribe's Ico design consultancy were given the responsibility of Snog's graphics, name development and branding.

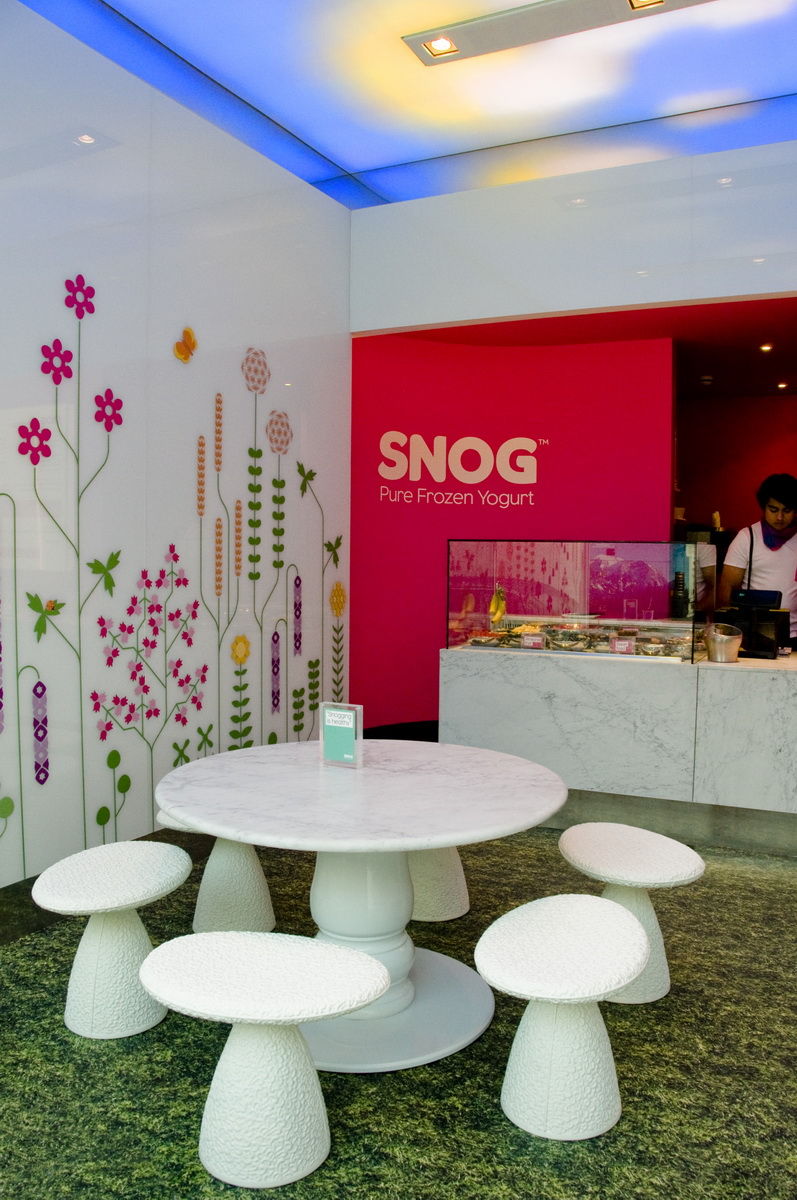
The interior of Snog's South Kensington store

The first Snog shop opened in South Kensington on 22 May 2008. It then opened stores in Soho and Westfield, respectively. A fourth store opened in Covent Garden in the latter half of 2009. Pestana noted in August 2009 that whilst the expansion of the company had been "fairly quick", it was not as fast as they had expected and they hoped to roll out the company across the rest of the UK by the following year. Pestana also noted how they would have some customers come in up to three times a day, commenting, "There are people who'll have a SNOG for their breakfast and dinner, and some who just like it as a snack - it becomes a bit of a craving for lots of people". He also recalled how one of their busiest days was when it snowed, commenting that there was a queue "going out of the door". Pestana opined, "There aren't many juice bars where you can sit for hours and enjoy the product. Everyone's getting a bit tired of the whole café culture and this is definitely going to be the next big thing".

Snog's shops designs have been shaped by young designers and artists. In 2008, Dominic Harris of Cinimod Studio designed the first Snog shop in South Kensington in partnership with one of the founders, Uribe, of Studio Uribe and ICO Design. The designers' intent for the interior was to portray a "never-ending summer", with the floor painted to look like grass and vinyl flowers covering the walls, in addition to over 3000 LED lamps behind the shop's translucent plastic ceiling trying to evoke a summer sky, with the colour changing depending on the time of the day and night. This subsequently made Snog the first store to have a fully digital ceiling. Cinimod Studio revealed, "As SNOG is the first of its type in the UK, the brief was to create a new high-end interior 'experience and emotions' environment that bore no resemblance to prior ice-cream parlours or cafe precedents." They explained that the interior was "deliberately quirky", highlighting the "photographic grass floor and a 'digital sky' which adjusts the mood of the store perpetually throughout the day and evenings". In 2009, Cinimod Studio designed Snog's Soho store, where they installed 700 glass spheres with LED lights inside them that constantly changed colour. Shitake stools were also installed in that location, as they also had been in the South Kensington store.

Snog's store in Brewer Street, London

At its peak, Snog had 10 stores in London, including in Notting Hill. It was the market leader of frozen yoghurt chains in the UK and had increasing competition from chains such as Yog, Yoomoo and Pinkberry. As of 2012, Snog had franchise partners in Asia, including – the Middle East region and Pakistan – and South America. It opened a store in Qatar, with a second store opening in the country in the Villaggio Mall in Doha in 2014. Baines said that the company were delighted to open a second store in Qatar following the success of their first and believed that both Villaggio and Snog were an "unforgettable experience". In 2011, Snog discussed take-home product listings with several major supermarkets. The following year, Unilever invested in Snog, which was looking into expand in and out of the UK; Baines said that they had a "shared vision" for where Snog would develop and that the investment would enable the brand to reach more consumers.

In 2014, Unilver released mini frozen yoghurt pots under the Snog brand, beginning with three flavours that had real fruit pieces inside: Passionfruit Pip Pop, Berry Blue Açaí Burst and Summer Berry Berry Slam. Ghee said that the three flavours were chosen as they were already popular in Snog stores and opined that they "bring the SNOG brand identity to life with quirky and considered ingredients that stay true a real fruit experience". The pots were initially 140ml with a recommended retail price of £1.69 and first launched in Ocado and Waitrose before also being available in Sainsbury's and The Co-operative Group in June 2014. The pots had different brightly coloured lids to differentiate between the flavours. Zhelin Chen from Unilever cited how the frozen yoghurt market 15% in the past year and said "as the UK leader in ice cream, we're excited to be partnering with Snog to tap into the fastest growing segment in the category with three unique flavour combinations". That same year, it was reported that Unilever was "ramping up support" for Snog and they planned to have a "large digital investment" to market the brand.

Snog in the London Borough of Lambeth

SSP announced in March 2016 that they would be working with Snog to offer various frozen yoghurts alongside its Millie's Cookies store in Westquay shopping centre. SSP's CEO Simon Smith said that they partnered with Snog as they believed it was the best yoghurt and stood out, adding, "With its cheeky persona and an outstanding product range, Snog is the ideal complement to our Millie's Cookies brand". Smith also said that adding a frozen yogurt range would give customers more choice and meet demands of the culinary trend as he believed that frozen yoghurt was very popular at the time the partnership was announced.

Joe Alwyn revealed in a 2020 interview that he used to work at a Snog shop in London, and he called the experience "exceptional". In December 2020, it was reported that Snog would open on 51 Turnham Green Terrace in Chiswick, London, after the location had been vacant since the closure of Borough Wines in February 2018. This marked Snog's 10th location in England. The same address had previously operated another frozen yoghurt outlet, Samba Swirl, before it closed in 2016. Snog submitted an application to sell alcohol in sealed packaging for home consumption through delivery partners, with no alcohol being sold to drink on the premises itself.

== Reception ==
A writer from The Caterer in 2009 opined that Snog using agave instead of sugar appealed to both "provenance- and health-conscious consumers"; however, they noted that the product would not become popular with the roughly 15% of the UK population who were lactose intolerant. Lizzie Asante from BBC News opined that Snog in the 2010s was "the big name in froyo". In 2014, a writer from The Peninsula called Snog's shops in London "beautifully designed" and opined that Snog was the "perfect name for a young, cheeky, urban British company", adding that the "memorable name" set the tone for the brand's "creative direction" and gave it a very important asset. They also opined that the experience in Snog's shops were "kept engaging and fresh by promoting young designers and artists" and also called the toppings "tasty" and a "mind-boggling display". They also highlighted the ingredients sometimes being exotic and "locally relevant" that gave an "inspiring choice for the healthiest and the most indulgent appetites".

In 2015, Kat Hopps from The Resident put Snog on her list of the eight best ice cream parlours in Notting Hill, writing, "Everything about Snog – from its tongue-in-cheek sloganing like 'You'll never forget your first Snog' to its futuristic-looking parlours – gets it right". In 2019, Time Out put Snog on its list of the best frozen yoghurt shops in London, calling it a "fun-loving purveyor of frozen yoghurt".

== See also ==
- List of frozen yogurt companies
