= Daniel Kim =

Daniel Kim may refer to:

- Daniel Dae Kim (born 1968), American actor
- Daniel J. Kim, founder of American frozen yoghurt chain Red Mango
- Daniel K. Kim, founder of Lit Motors
- Danny Kim (born 1998), Australian soccer player
