= Netflix vs. the World =

- Directed by: Shawn Cauthen
- Written by: Gina Keating
- Based on: Netflixed: The Epic Battle For America's Eyeballs by Gina Keating
- Release date: 2019
- Running time: 105 minutes
- Country: United States
- Language: English

Netflix vs. the World is a documentary film by Shawn Cauthen and Gina Keating about the origin and success of Netflix. The film was premiered at the Lone Star Film Festival in 2019, later released on Amazon Prime Video in 2020.

== Background ==
The film is directed by Shawn Cauthen, It is based on the 2012 book Netflixed: The Epic Battle For America's Eyeballs by author-journalist Gina Keating, who also acts as a writer for the film.

== Synopsis ==
The documentary covers the journey of Netflix from DVD-by-mail company to the world's largest streaming company, also covering its time as a struggling Silicon Valley startup and competition with Blockbuster and Amazon. The film includes interviews from John Antioco (chairman and CEO of Blockbuster), Nick Shepard (COO Blockbuster), Marc Randolph (co-founder Netflix) and Tom Dillon (COO Netflix).

== Reception ==
Film Threat found that "Netflix vs. the World is a fascinating piece of history and is the go-to documentary about the history of Netflix and how it got here today."

The film won Best Documentary film of 2019 award by the Lone Star Film Festival.
