= Derek Cha =

Founder of Sweet Frog

- Citizenship: United States
- Occupation: Businessman
- Known for: Founder of Sweet Frog
- Spouse: Annah Kim

Derek Cha is a Korean American entrepreneur who co-founded the frozen yogurt chain Sweet Frog in 2009.

In 2019, Cha was convicted of domestic battery against his wife, a co-founder of Sweet Frog.

== Early life and career ==
Cha was born and raised in South Korea. At age 12, Cha and his family migrated to the United States. In 1985, Cha started two framing businesses named "Art and Frame Depot" and "Art and Frame Warehouse." He eventually grew both businesses into a large chain of 80 stores nationwide, generating between $5 million and $10 million a year in revenue.

== Founding of Sweet Frog ==
In 2009, Cha and his wife opened the first Sweet Frog in Short Pump, Virginia. Several months later on July 7, they opened their second store in Chesterfield, Virginia, which was even more successful than the first store. Their next stores were then opened in Chesterfield, Richmond, Charlottesville, Lynchburg, and Williamsburg, all located in Virginia. The growth continued in 2011, as Sweet Frog opened 29 stores, and accelerated in 2012 as 113 more Sweet Frog stores opened, mostly located in the east coast states of Virginia, North Carolina, Maryland, South Carolina, and Pennsylvania. On April 17, 2012, at a time when Sweet Frog had 180 stores operating in the United States and a few foreign countries, Boxwood Capital Partners made a minority investment into Sweet Frog Enterprises, LLC, the company that owns and operates Sweet Frog.

== Domestic violence conviction ==
In 2019, Cha was convicted of domestic battery against his wife. He was sentenced to time served.
