= Llao Llao =

Llao Llao may refer to:

- llaollao, a multinational frozen yogurt chain
- Llao Llao Hotel, a hotel in Argentina
