= Yogoberry =

Brazilian chain of frozen-yogurt stores

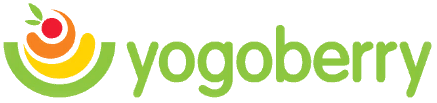
- Industry: Restaurants
- Founded: 2007; 19 years ago in Rio de Janeiro, Brazil
- Founders: Un Ae Hong and Jong Ae Hong
- Headquarters: Rio de Janeiro, Brazil
- Number of locations: 100+ in Brazil, 2 in Iran
- Products: Frozen Yogurt; Smoothies; Yogurt
- Website: www.yogoberry.com.br

The Yogoberry ([joɡoˈbɛɾi]) is the largest Brazilian chain of frozen yogurt and smoothie stores, founded in 2007 in Rio de Janeiro by the South Korean sisters Un Ae Hong and Jong Ae Hong.

The chain has more than 24 stores throughout Brazil, and two stores in Iran.

== History ==
The franchise was created by the sisters Un Ae Hong, a former flight attendant on Varig, and Jong Ae Hong, a nutritionist, both South Korean naturalized Brazilians. The entrepreneurs, who lived in California, realized the growing popularity of frozen yogurt in the United States. Un Ae and Jong Ae believed that the success of the product would be the same in Brazil, where the population is also concerned about seeking a healthy diet.

Jong Ae used her knowledge of nutrition to adapt the formula of frozen yogurt to the Brazilian taste and after more than a year of research to assess the market and the public, Yogoberry opened its first shop in Ipanema, Rio de Janeiro in 2007.

In 2010, the company signed a multi-year contract to expand the brand in the Middle East and in 2011 with the help of their master franchisee Biaoboro Bastani PJS, Yogoberry opened its very first international shop in Tehran, Iran, which was inaugurated by Ambassador Antonio Luis Espinola Salgado of Brazil.

In 2017, Biaoboro Bastani PJS signed its first sub-franchise for the city of Bandar Abbas which was inaugurated on 30 January 2018 by Rodrigo de Azeredo Santos, ambassador of Brazil.

== See also ==
- List of frozen yogurt companies
