= Frosty Boy =

Australian ice cream brand

- Slogan: “Often Licked, Never Beaten!”
- Type: Company and franchise
- Headquarters: Yatala, Queensland, Australia
- Products: Frozen yogurt Soft serves Beverages
- Website: www.frostyboy.com.au

Frosty Boy is an Australian manufacturer and distributor of soft serve and frozen yogurt products headquartered in Yatala, Queensland, Australia. Founded in 1976, Frosty Boy manufactures products including soft serves, frozen yoghurts and beverage bases for customers internationally.

== Logo ==
The first version of the logo was designed in 1976; it was a boy holding an ice cream. From 1999 there were a number of design variations to the Frosty Boy logo in regards to layout, colour, text and size. Apart from the regular logo changes, Frosty Boy changed its logo to green in the year 2008. In the years 2011, 2012 and 2013, Christmas themed logos were designed to celebrate the festival.

Frosty boy has also expanded their business to United States and Canada.

During the 1970s the slogan for Frosty Boy was "often licked, never beaten".

== See also ==
- Dairy farming in Australia
