= Humphrey Yogart =

- Interactive map of Humphrey Yogart

Restaurant information
- Established: 1984
- Owner: Paula Sheftel
- Previous owners: Maria and Raphael Baker
- Location: 4520 Van Nuys Boulevard, Sherman Oaks, Los Angeles, California, 91403, United States of America
- Coordinates: 34.153°N 118.447°W

Humphrey Yogart is a frozen yogurt shop in Sherman Oaks, Los Angeles. The store was established by Maria and Raphael Baker in 1984. Current owner Paula Sheftel purchased the store in 1986 for $110,000. At its peak, the chain supported six stores in the greater Los Angeles area; however, as of 2024, only the Sherman Oaks location remains open. In 2017, a CBS News affiliate identified it as one of the best frozen yogurt stores in Los Angeles. The store's name is a play on the name of the famous actor Humphrey Bogart.

In 2021, the store attracted significant media attention after Meghan Markle discussed the store in an interview with Oprah Winfrey. During the interview, Markle disclosed that she had worked at the store during her early teenage years and that doing so had shown her the "value of working." Following the interview, the store experienced a massive surge in popularity. Seeking to capitalize on this newfound popularity, the store subsequently launched a new, limited-time yogurt flavor called "Banana Royale" in honor of Markle. The media attention was so significant that the store briefly hired a publicist (and former employee) to interface with the media.
