= Sweet Frog =

Chain of frozen yogurt retail stores

- Type: Private
- Industry: Chain restaurant, franchise
- Founded: Richmond, Virginia (2009; 17 years ago)
- Founder: Derek Cha and Annah Kim
- Number of locations: 350+ (2016)
- Area served: United States; Dominican Republic
- Key people: Kevin Spencer Garrett
- Products: Frozen yogurt
- Parent: MTY Food Group
- Website: www.sweetfrog.com

Sweet Frog is a chain of frozen yogurt retail restaurants. Derek Cha and Annah Kim co-founded the first sweetFrog shop in Richmond, Virginia in 2009. The "FROG" part of the name, according to Cha, is an acronym for "Fully Rely on God".

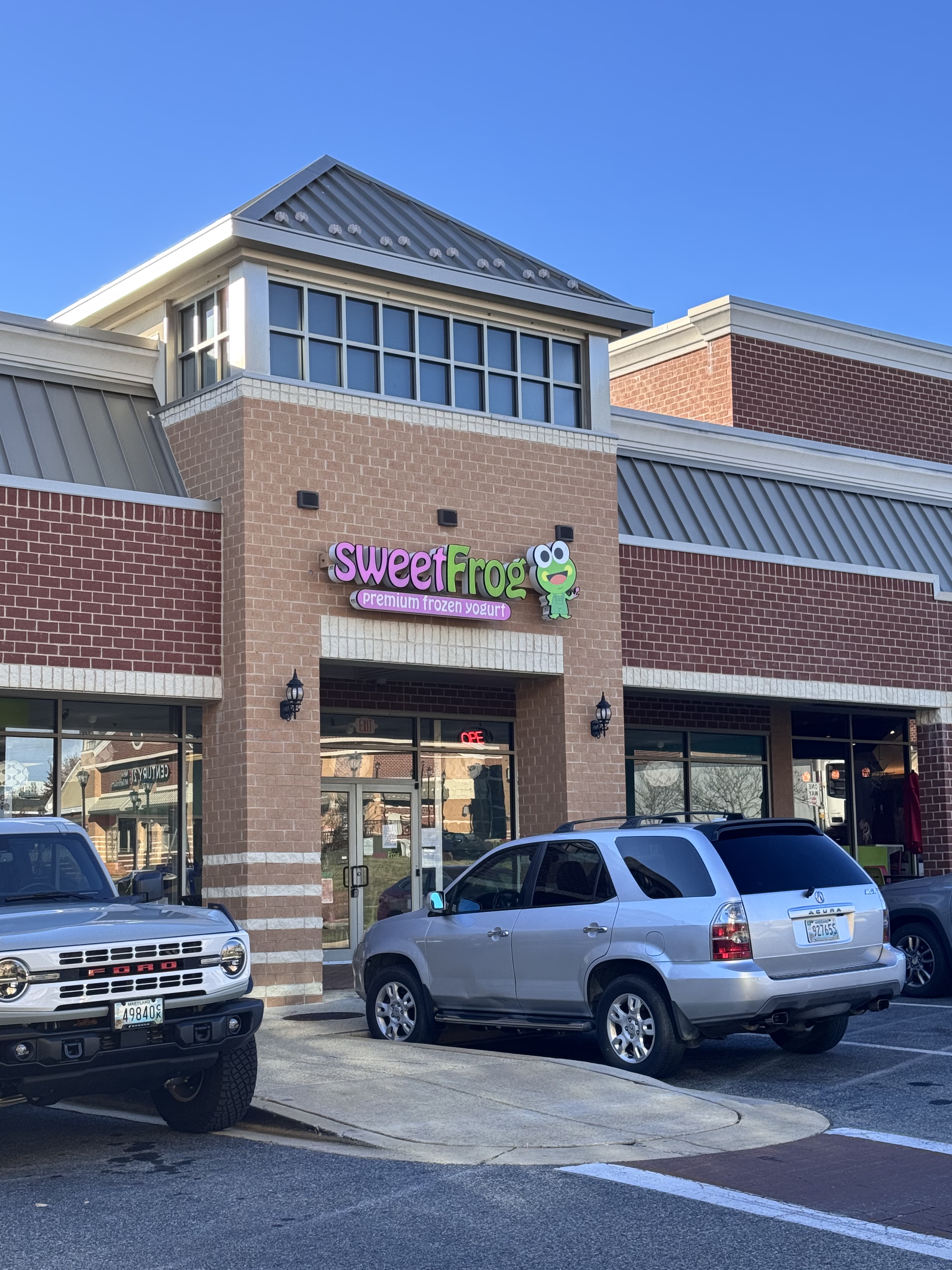
Sweet Frog in Prince Frederick, Maryland

The sweetFrog restaurant's interiors are painted pink and green, and the typical store consists of seven or eight frozen yogurt machines, toppings bars, and merchandise, much of which is centered on sweetFrog's mascots "Scoop" and "Cookie." Based in Scottsdale, Arizona at the time of its acquisition by MTY Food Group, the chain operated 332 locations in the United States and Dominican Republic, most of which are franchised.

== History ==
Derek Cha and Annah Kim started Sweet Frog with one restaurant in 2009. By 2013, Sweet Frog had grown to over 215 stores in 25 states in the U.S., with more stores located internationally in the Dominican Republic, the United Kingdom, and Egypt.

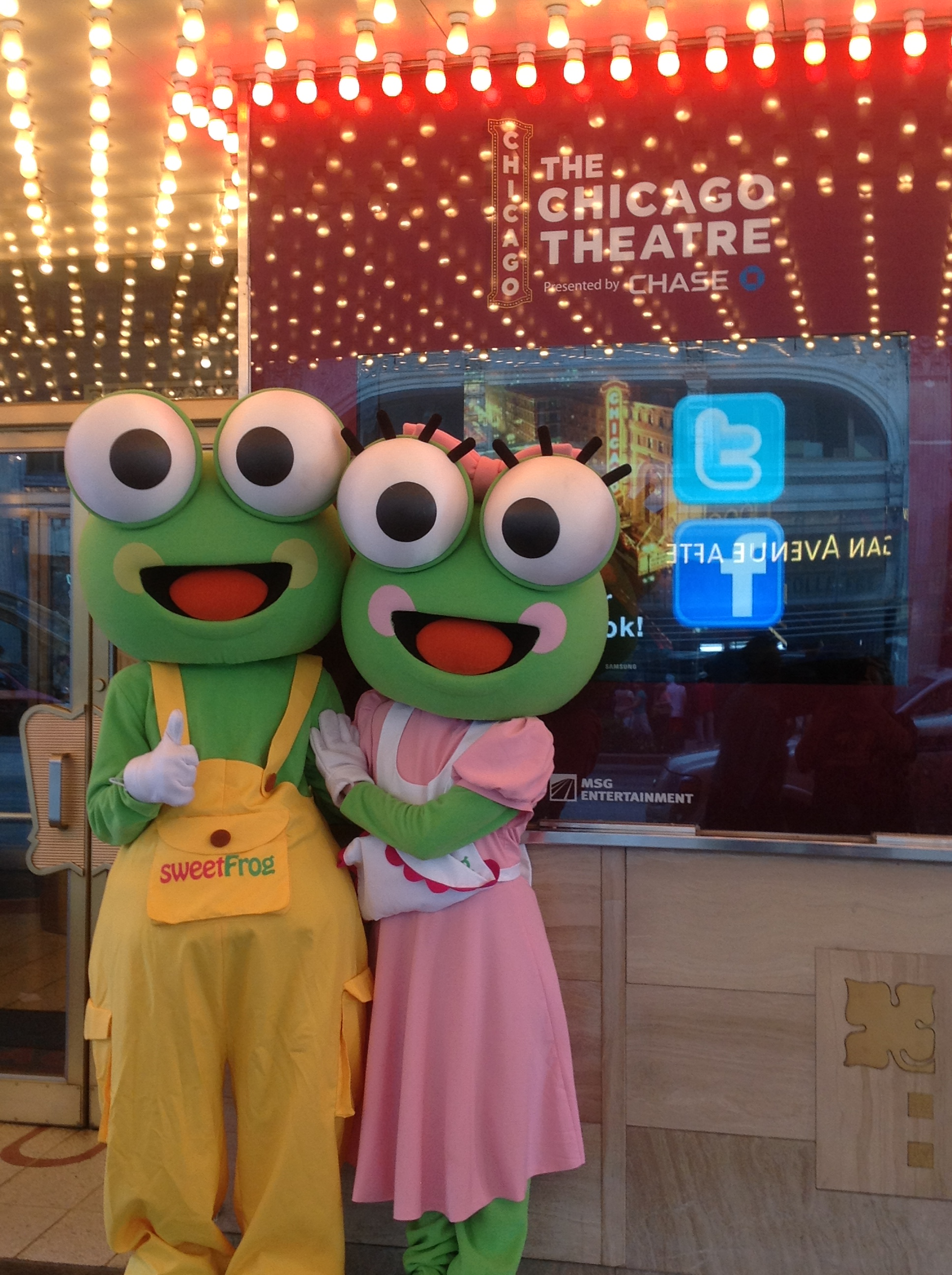
Scoop & Cookie promoting Sweet Frog's first Chicago area restaurant in Frankfort, IL.

On April 17, 2012, Boxwood Capital Partners, LLC announced that it had made a growth capital investment in Sweet Frog. After the investment, James Patrick Galleher, the Managing Director at Boxwood Capital Partners became the Chief Executive Officer of Sweet Frog.

On February 2, 2015, it was announced that Boxwood Capital Partners, LLC had acquired SweetFrog Enterprises, LLC. In the Fall of 2018, Sweet Frog was acquired by a wholly owned subsidiary of Canada-based MTY Food Group Inc. of Montreal, Quebec.

In 2019, Sweet Frog co-founder Derek Cha was found guilty of domestic battery against his wife and co-founder, Annah Kim, and was sentenced to 30 days in jail.

== Sponsorships ==
On April 18, 2016, it was announced by BK Racing that sweetFrog would be sponsoring David Ragan and the No. 23 Toyota Camry for the Toyota Owners 400 at Richmond International Raceway. sweetFrog returned to sponsor Ragan's No. 23 for the Federated Auto Parts 400 at Richmond in August. sweetFrog later appeared in the video game NASCAR Heat Evolution.

== See also ==
- List of frozen yogurt companies
