= Chocolate Shoppe Ice Cream Company =

Ice cream company based in Madison, Wisconsin

- Founded: 1962
- Founder: Chuck Sr. & Nancy Deadman
- Headquarters: Madison, Wisconsin
- Products: Ice cream
- Website: www.chocolateshoppeicecream.com

Chocolate Shoppe Ice Cream Co. is an ice cream company based in Madison, Wisconsin that manufactures and distributes ice cream, Italian ice, oat ice cream, and no sugar added ice cream.

== History ==
Chocolate Shoppe Ice Cream Company was founded in 1962 by Chuck Sr. and Nancy Deadman as a candy and ice cream shop in Madison, Wisconsin. The original shop was called Chocolate House Candy and Ice Cream, and served candies purchased from Chocolate House of Milwaukee, Wisconsin and 19 flavors of homemade super-premium ice cream. The company expanded by opening additional locations in the Madison area, and selling ice cream to local restaurants and businesses. In the 1970s the company focused in on the ice cream business by ceasing their candy sales, building an ice cream manufacturing plant at 2221 Daniels St., Madison, WI and changing the company name to Chocolate Shoppe Ice Cream Company.

The Chocolate Shoppe Ice Cream is now operated by Chuck Jr. and Dave Deadman. The company owns a manufacturing plant and four company-owned ice cream shops in Madison, manufactures over 100 ice cream flavors, and distributes products to over 600 independently owned ice cream parlors and businesses across the country.

== Operations ==
Chocolate Shoppe Ice Cream produces ice cream with 14% butterfat content and 35% overrun (air). The ice cream is kosher certified and made with rBGH-free cream. This includes flavors such as all natural "Zanzibar Chocolate" ice cream made with three kinds of cocoa, and for flavors such as "Fat Elvis" made with banana ice cream, a peanut butter ripple and chocolate chunks, and "Scotch Ale Caramel Crunch" made with scotch ale ice cream, caramel and heath pieces.

== See also ==
- List of frozen yogurt companies
