= Yoajung =

South Korean frozen yogurt chain

- Native name: 요아정
- Industry: Restaurant
- Founded: 2021; 4 years ago
- Owner: Samhwa Foods

Korean name
- Hangul: 요아정
- RR: Yoajeong
- MR: Yoajŏng
- Website: yoajung.co.kr

Yoajung (Korean: 요아정) is a South Korean franchise of frozen yogurt restaurants. It was founded in 2021. Its name is reportedly an acronym for "yogurt ice cream done right" (요거트 아이스크림의 정석).

Its frozen yogurts are served with various toppings, including raw honeycomb, cookies, chocolate syrup, and fruit. The addition of toppings adds to the price of the dish.

In the 2020s, the chain experienced a significant boom in popularity amongst people in their teens and twenties. It reportedly became highly popular on delivery apps. Its popularity was followed by social media videos about how to make similar dishes at home. The store had 166 stores in 2023, but by 2024 had around 400. A November 2024 news article gave the number of stores as 470. In July 2024, the brand was acquired by Samhwa Foods at a 100% stake costing ₩40 billion.
