= Yo-Chi =

Australian chain of frozen yogurt restaurants

- Type: Private
- Industry: Chain restaurant Franchise
- Founded: Melbourne, Australia, in 2012; 14 years ago
- Founder: Manny Stul; Paul Solomon
- Number of locations: 70 (March 2026)
- Area served: Australia, Singapore, United States
- Key people: Oliver and Riley Allis (co-owners)
- Products: Frozen yogurt Toppings
- Website: yochi.com.au

Yo-Chi is an Australian frozen yogurt franchise providing self-serve frozen yogurt. Opening its first store in 2012, following slow growth and two acquisitions, the chain has experienced rapid growth in the 2020s, with the brand being particularly popular amongst Generation Z.

== History ==
Yo-Chi's first store opened in September 2012, in the inner Melbourne suburb of Balaclava.

In 2018, Yo-Chi was sold to chef and television personality George Calombaris, under his company MAdE Establishment Group.

In 2020, following Calombaris' establishment going into voluntary administration, where Yo-Chi was the only part to survive, it was then sold to Oliver and Riley Allis, sons of Boost Juice founder Janine Allis. The brothers were 23 and 21 years old, respectively, at the time of the sale. There were only four locations at the time.

Under the Allis family, the number of stores have rapidly increased, opening their 30th store in June 2024, having 43 locations by March 2025, 53 by June 2025, 56 by August 2025, and opening their 70th store in March 2026.

In August 2025, Yo-Chi began their international expansion, opening a store in Singapore and their first UK store in London's Notting Hill in 2026.

== See also ==
- List of frozen dessert brands
- List of frozen yogurt companies
