= Red Mango =

American frozen yogurt and smoothie brand

Red Mango FC, LLC.
- Type: Private
- Industry: Restaurants
- Founded: 2002
- Founder: Daniel J. Kim
- Headquarters: Dallas, Texas, US
- Number of locations: 44 (US), 7 (Puerto Rico)
- Area served: United States; Puerto Rico; Qatar; El Salvador
- Key people: John Antioco, Chairman
- Products: Frozen yogurt Smoothies; Juices; Hot chocolates Probiotic beverages Parfaits
- Parent: BRIX Holdings, LLC
- Website: www.redmangousa.com

Red Mango FC, LLC is an American frozen yogurt and smoothie brand known for its all-natural frozen yogurt, fresh fruit smoothies, yogurt parfaits, and fresh juices. There are now more than 50 locations in over 15 states in the United States and Puerto Rico, and one each in El Salvador and Qatar. In 2011, Red Mango was named the No. 1 Zagat Rated chain in America for smoothies and frozen yogurt.

== Background ==
Daniel J. Kim, the company's founder, graduated from UC Berkeley's Haas School of Business in 1998, and first worked as an investment banker with Donaldson, Lufkin & Jenrette.

According to the company website, Red Mango gets its name because "the mango, distinctly delicious and high in nutrition, becomes red at its optimal stage of ripeness."

== Expansion ==
The first store was opened in 2007 in Los Angeles near UCLA. After opening their first store in California, Red Mango opened stores in Nevada, Utah, Washington, and New York. One year after the first store opened in Los Angeles, Red Mango opened 30 new stores. In 2008, Taco Bell executive John Antioco stepped down and became an advisor for Red Mango, this helped the brand grow to 20 stores by April 2008. By the end of 2009, Red Mango had 60 stores in operation.

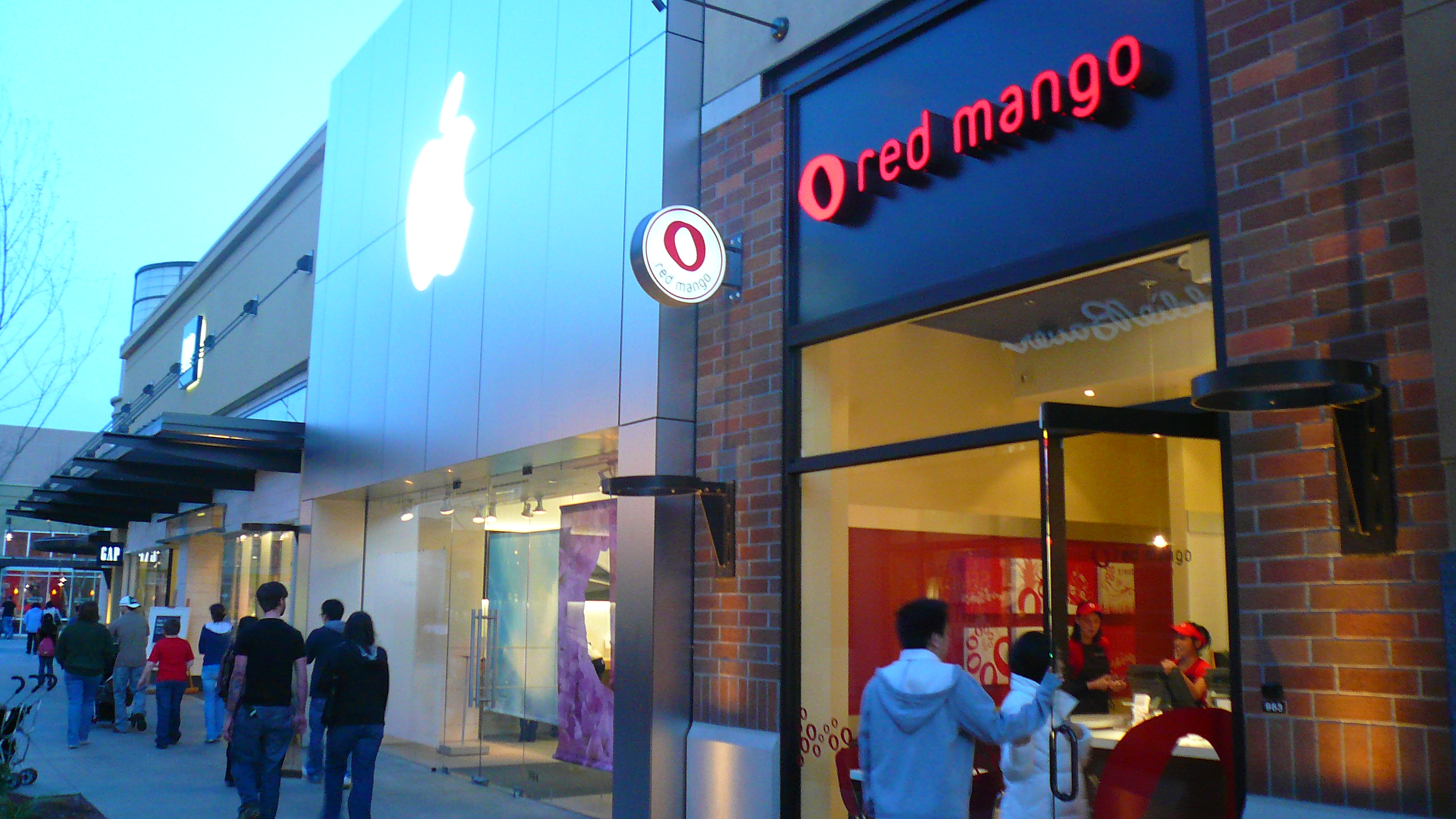
A Red Mango store in Lynnwood, Washington

In the summer of 2010, Red Mango added 22 varieties of smoothies to their menu. By the end of 2010, Red Mango awarded agreements for 147 locations and opened 62 new stores, bringing the total number of locations to 100. They were named #4 on Restaurant Business Magazine's "Future 50" list of the fastest-growing chains in 2010.

In May 2012, the Dallas-based company entered into an agreement with Mexican theater chain Cinemex to introduce Red Mango products to Mexico.

They open many of their stores on or near college campuses. In 2010, about 70% of Red Mango's buyers were women.

Red Mango also has seven stores in the Philippines: One in Makati, one in Manila, four in Quezon City and one in San Juan, Metro Manila.

== Products ==
Red Mango uses all-natural, nonfat and lowfat kosher frozen yogurt fortified with probiotics. They were the first frozen yogurt store to be certified by the National Yogurt Association with the Live & Active Cultures seal, indicating the use of real yogurt. As of July 2008, the company's lineup of frozen yogurt flavors consisted of Original, Pomegranate, Madagascar Vanilla, and a rotating variety of seasonal or specialty flavors. These include Green Tea, Mango, Banana, Nutty Potion, and Peanut Butter.

Red Mango's frozen yogurt is topped with fruits (such as blueberries, mango, pineapple, and strawberries) and/or "fun and crunchy" items (such as almonds, graham cracker, organic granola, and mochi).

== Management ==
The company's investors and advisors include John Antioco (former CEO and chairman of Blockbuster Inc., Taco Bell, and Circle K Convenience Stores). The company, which currently has offices in Dallas, Texas, and New York, New York, raised $12 million in private equity financing in August 2008 and moved its headquarters from Sherman Oaks, California, to Dallas in early May 2009.

== See also ==
- List of frozen dessert brands
