= Clean Juice =

American restaurant franchise

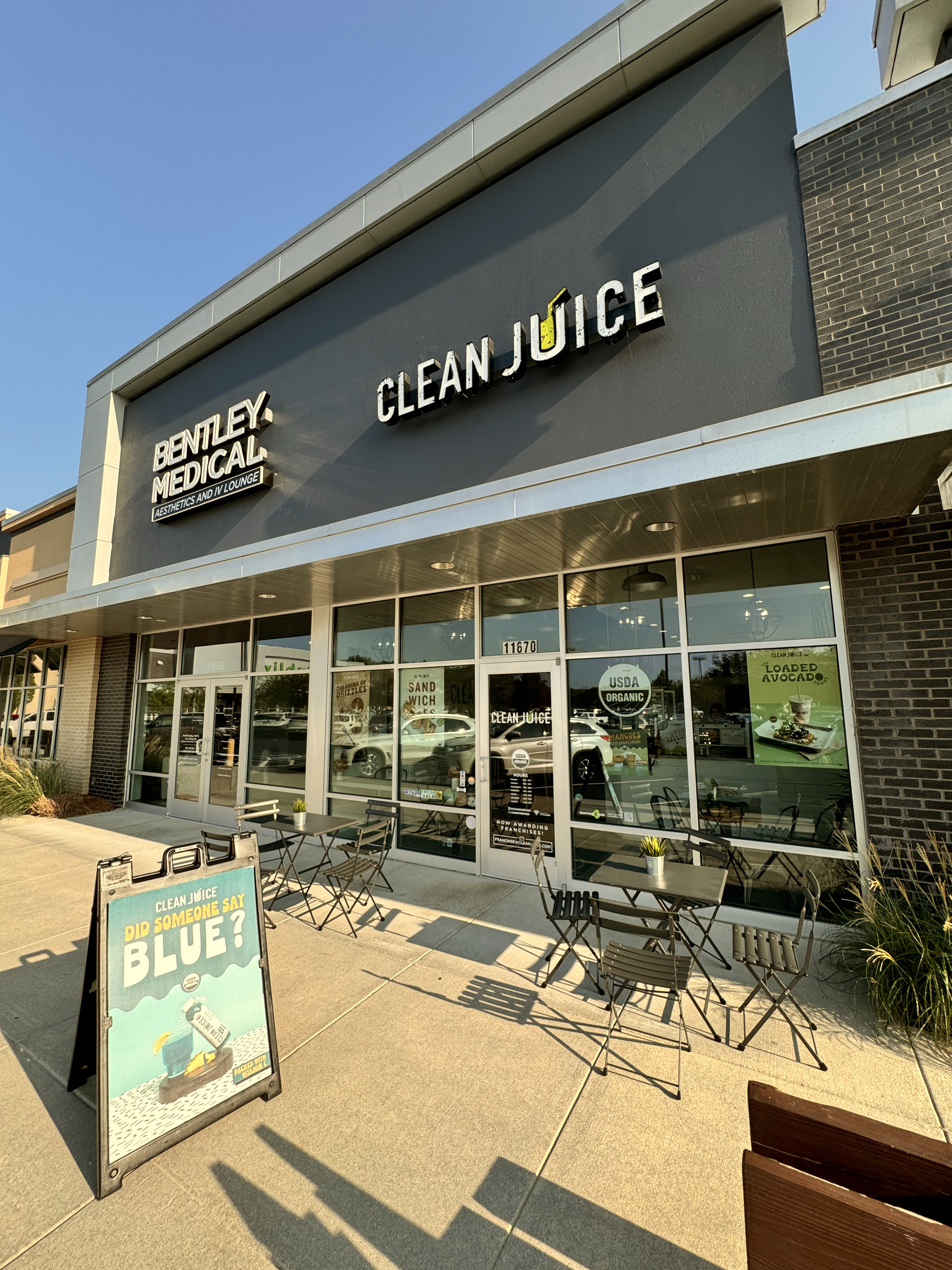
- Clean Juice in Knoxville, Tennessee
- Company type: Private
- Industry: Restaurant, Quick Service Restaurant
- Founded: 2014; 12 years ago
- Headquarters: Dallas, Texas, U.S.
- Area served: United States
- Key people: John Antioco, Chairman
- Products: Smoothies; Juices; Acai bowls
- Owner: BRIX Holdings, LLC (2024–present)
- Website: www.cleanjuice.com

Clean Juice is an American restaurant franchise that primarily serves smoothies, juices, acai bowls, wraps, and sandwiches. Landon and Kat Eckles started Clean Juice in 2016 as the first USDA-certified organic juice bar franchise, claiming to be the only franchise of its kind in 2016.

In May 2024, BRIX Holdings LLC announced that it had completed the acquisition of the restaurant chain. Headquartered in Dallas, Texas, the company has over 80 Clean Juice locations under development or in operation across thirty states in the United States.

== History ==
Clean Juice was founded in 2014 by husband and wife, Landon and Kat Eckles. The first location in Huntersville, North Carolina in June 2015. In April 2016, another location opened in South Charlotte with a third location opening in Concord, North Carolina in August 2016. By that month, Clean Juice had signed its first 5 franchising agreements after launching its franchising platform earlier that summer.

Its first franchised location opened in Carrollwood, Florida in March 2017. By July of that year, there were 5 franchised locations in operation with another 58 in development. A total of 10 stores (two of them corporately-owned) were operational by September 2017. In 2018, the company began using the mobile payment and loyalty reward platform, LevelUp. That year, the company also surpassed 100 franchise units either in development or in operation in 16 states.

In its short history, Clean Juice has amassed dozens of achievements and awards, including being named #154 in Entrepreneur Magazine's 2021 Franchise 500® ranking and the #1 spot as Franchise Gator's 2021 Fastest-Growing Franchises list. On May 20th, 2024, Brix Holdings LLC — the multi-brand franchising portfolio group and parent company of Friendly’s, Orange Leaf, Smoothie Factory USA, Souper Salad and Red Mango — announced the final acquisition of Clean Juice brings the Brix portfolio up to eight brands and more than 300 locations.

== Products ==
Clean Juice primarily sells fruit smoothies and juices (cold-pressed and fresh) with select food items like acai bowls, toasts, sandwiches and wraps. The brand dropped their organic certification in February of 2026, though many of their ingredients are still certified organic and some locations still source exclusively organic.
