= Wakaberry =

South African frozen yoghurt chain

- Wakaberry's Logo
- Website: www.wakaberry.co.za

Wakaberry was a South African soft-serve frozen yoghurt bar, established in Durban in May 2011 and classified under the Froyo trade name. Created by Ken and Michele Fourie and their business partner, David Clark, in 2011, the company grew throughout South Africa operating over 40 franchises in eight provinces. There are two remaining in South Africa.

== Origin ==
The founders, inspired by the growing “Froyo” industry around the world, saw an opportunity to bring the concept to the South African market. Wakaberry was the first self-service, pay-per weight yoghurt store in South Africa. The name Wakaberry was derived from the 2010 FIFA World Cup song "Waka Waka (This Time for Africa)".

== Popularity ==
Initially, Wakaberry stores were owner-owned until its first franchised store, Wakaberry Lonehill, was opened in 2012. Originally, the brand was not set out to be a franchise; this developed due to customer demand and resulted in the franchise becoming one of the fastest-growing companies in the country. In March 2014, restaurant franchise group Famous Brands acquired a 70% stake in the Wakaberry Frozen Yoghurt Bar business, for an undisclosed sum. This acquisition has set in motion the extension of the company's name, with planned worldwide expansion. Famous Brands chief executive Kevin Hedderwick stated that the acquisition of the company would help the further growth of some of the country's most famous family restaurants, Wimpy and Steers, and their goal of becoming a complete food service provider. On July 26, 2014, the company celebrated the country's first 'National Frozen Yogurt Day', which allowed the first 200 customers through each of the 36 stores' doors to receive a special limited edition spoon. A smartphone application and two new flavors were released on the same day. in 2022, there are only 2 remaining in South Africa located in Sandton and Randpark Ridge.
