= Daniel J. Kim =

Korean American businessman

Dan Kim
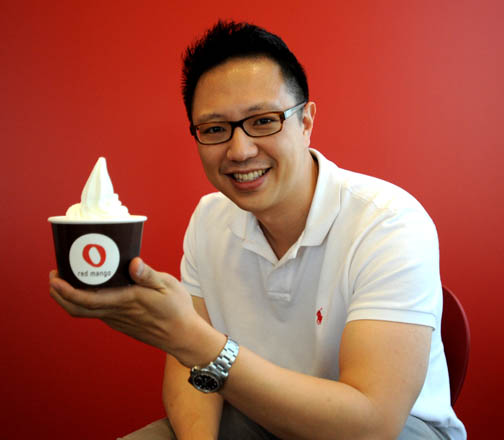
- Born: Seoul, South Korea
- Occupations: VP, Business Development at Coinbase Coinbase
- Known for: Founder of Red Mango

Daniel J. "Dan" Kim is the founder and former executive officer of Red Mango, an American frozen yogurt and smoothie chain. Currently, Kim serves as VP, Business Development at Coinbase. Previously, Kim held the position of Head of Global Sales, Marketing and Delivery for Tesla, and served as Chief of Staff and Chief Marketing Officer for Solera Holdings, a Dallas, Texas-based software and technology company.

== Early life ==
Kim was born in Seoul, South Korea, and moved to the U.S. with his parents soon after. He grew up in southern California. After working as an investment banker with Donaldson, Lufkin & Jenrette and as a financial analyst with Deloitte, he held jobs for a number of startups, including Stamps.com.

== Red Mango ==
Kim was 30 years old when he was approached by acquaintances in South Korea about introducing the frozen yogurt brand Red Mango to the United States. He agreed to lead the effort and adapted the concept for the American market by redesigning store layouts and implementing social media marketing strategies aimed at a younger demographic.

In 2007, Kim opened the first Red Mango in Los Angeles, California near UCLA's campus. Red Mango expanded to 100 locations in the next three years. Kim said that his three primary goals with Red Mango were to "get people to try the product, get them to know it’s good for them and give them a great in-store experience."

Prior to departing from Red Mango in 2015, Kim served as Red Mango's Chief Concept Officer and founder.

== Awards and recognition ==
He was also named “Entrepreneur of the Month” for January 2010 by Restaurant Business Magazine.
