= John Antioco =

American businessman

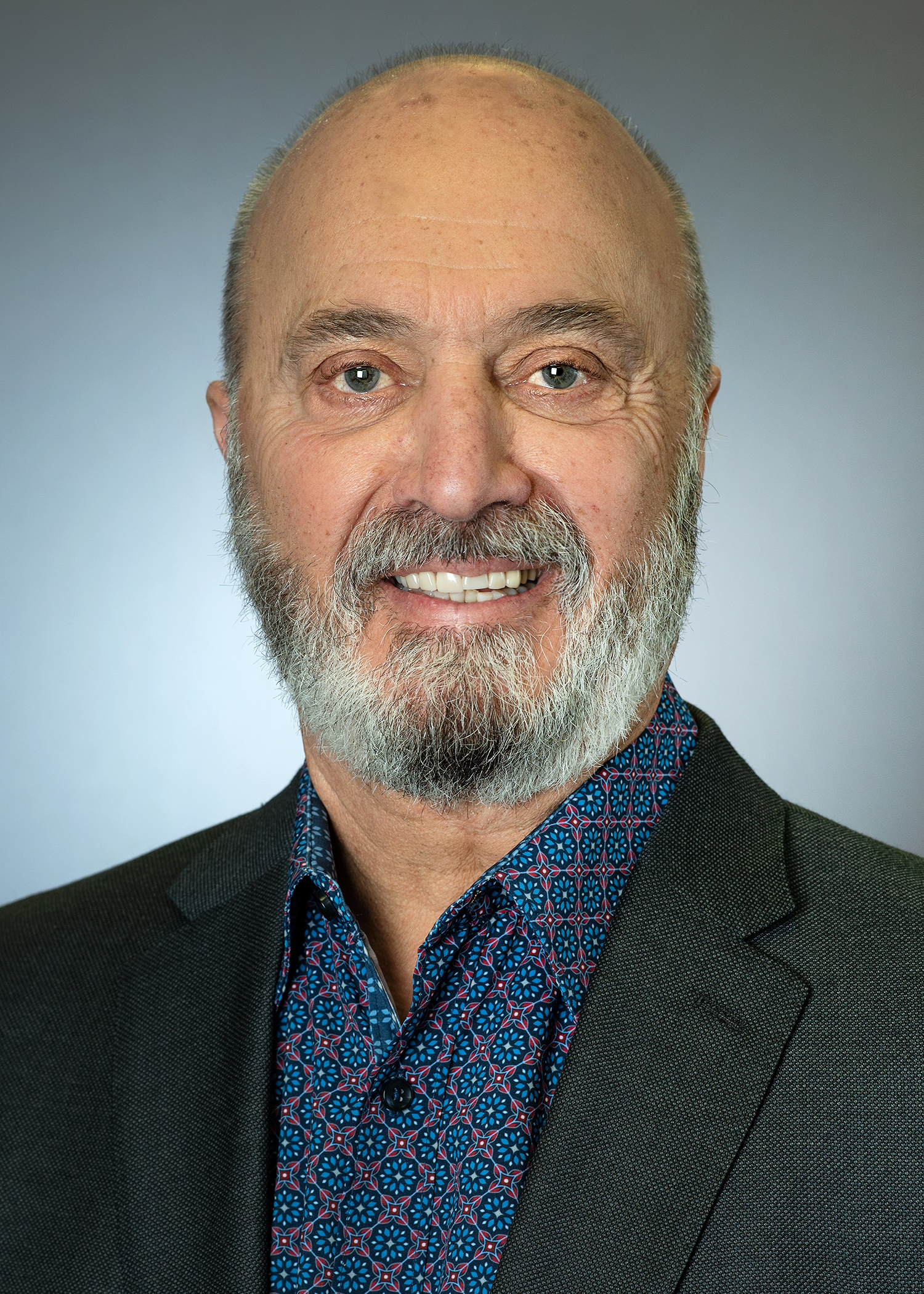
- John Antioco, 2022
- Born: November 1, 1949 (age 76); Brooklyn, New York, U.S.
- Education: New York Institute of Technology (BS)
- Employer(s): Managing Member of JAMCO Interests, Chairman of Brix Holdings, Chairman of Red Mango
- Known for: CEO of Blockbuster; Executive roles at 7-Eleven, Circle K, and Taco Bell
- Title: Chairman
- Term: 2008–present

John Antioco is an American businessman and currently the chairman of the board of directors at BRIX Holdings LLC and the Managing Partner of JAMCO Interests LLC.

== Biography ==
John Antioco was born and raised in Brooklyn, New York. His father was a milkman, whom Antioco would sometimes accompany on his morning delivery route. He is a graduate of the New York Institute of Technology, where he earned a B.S. in Business Administration.

Antioco began his career at the 7-Eleven convenience store chain and held numerous senior management positions during his 20-year tenure including Senior Vice President for the 8,000-outlet chain with responsibility for worldwide operations and marketing. Over his established career, he has held top executive management positions across multiple industries outside of convenience stores including entertainment and restaurant.

In August 2011, Antioco was appointed chairman of the board at Rave Cinemas. He was chairman when Rave sold 32 of its theaters to Cinemark in November 2012 for approximately $240 million. John Antioco has and continues to hold board positions with multi-national retail companies and was also a member of the board of governors of the Boys & Girls Clubs of America.

== Career ==
=== 7-Eleven ===
Antioco began his professional career at 7-Eleven, which he joined as a management trainee in 1970. He was at the company for 20 years, in various roles. As Senior Vice President of Marketing in April 1989, he was responsible for bringing on advertising firm J. Walter Thompson to create a slate of television commercials that marketed 7-Eleven to new-collar workers. Antioco was also Senior Vice President of Operations, which meant he was in charge of operations for all 7-Eleven stores worldwide.

=== Pearle Vision, Circle-K, and Taco Bell ===
Antioco left 7-Eleven in 1990 to become COO at Pearle Vision.

In 1991, he joined the convenience store chain Circle K, where he assumed the role of president and COO. Circle K had filed for bankruptcy in May 1990 and Antioco was brought in to streamline the company's operations. Under Antioco's leadership, the chain announced plans to close or sell about 1,550 of its least profitable locations and invest in improving the rest of its stores. In March 1992, at which point Antioco had become the company's CEO, Circle K was sold for approximately $425 million to a private investor group led by management in conjunction with Investcorp. In 1994, as CEO Antioco took Circle K public, selling 6.5 million shares of stock on the New York Stock Exchange. Antioco left Circle K in 1996, shortly after overseeing a $710 million sale of the company to Tosco Corp.

Antioco joined Taco Bell as its new CEO in 1996. During his time at Taco Bell, he oversaw changes to the company's menu, advertising, and its franchising model.

=== Blockbuster ===
Antioco took over as Blockbuster CEO in July 1997. When he joined the company, it was struggling financially, with cash flow down 70 percent during the second quarter of the 1997 financial year. This was in part due to Blockbuster's expansions into areas outside the video retail market, such apparel sales and a chain of music stores called Blockbuster Music. Antioco decoupled Blockbuster Music from its video division, putting it under separate management. The music store division was sold in August 1998 by Blockbuster's parent company Viacom to Wherehouse Entertainment for $115 million. Early in Antioco's CEO tenure, Blockbuster also ended its relationships with Virgin Interactive, Discovery Zone, and Spelling Entertainment.

In 1998, Antioco entered Blockbuster into ground breaking revenue-sharing agreements with Hollywood studios, which allowed its stores to obtain many copies of new releases at a lower price than their competitors and rectify the problem of unavailability of recently released Hollywood movie hits. In August 1999, Antioco took Blockbuster public, selling 18 percent of its stock on the New York Stock Exchange and raising $465 million. On the day of the initial public offering, he rang the opening bell of the NYSE alongside actress Rene Russo. At the time, Blockbuster's market share in the video rental space had recently grown to 31 percent.

In 2004, Antioco oversaw the launch of a new DVD subscription service called Blockbuster Online. The service allowed customers to rent Blockbuster DVDs online and have them delivered by mail. By the end of 2006, Blockbuster Online had approximately two million subscribers. In 2007, Antioco pushed to expand the service and rebranded it as Blockbuster Total Access, which in addition to offering online DVD rentals, also allowed customers to return a Blockbuster Online DVD to a brick and mortar Blockbuster store to receive one additional free rental.

Under Antioco, Blockbuster launched these services in part to compete with Netflix, which at the time was a growing competitor in the video retail space. By the last quarter of 2006, Blockbuster’s Total Access subscriber base was growing at a faster rate than Netflix. In September 2000, Netflix founders offered to sell their company to Blockbuster for $50 million. Antioco laughed them out of the room. Netflix shifted to streaming in 2007. Blockbuster filed for bankruptcy in 2010. Today, Netflix is worth over $200 billion.

Antioco left Blockbuster in 2007 due to strategy disagreements with Blockbuster board members over the continued support for the expansion of Blockbuster online business, most notably billionaire investor Carl Icahn, regarding the company's strategy.

=== JAMCO, Brix Holdings and other roles ===
In February 2010, Antioco founded, and is the Managing Member of JAMCO Interests, a private equity firm that invests in retail and hospitality ventures. JAMCO is the majority owner of Brix Holdings, which owns restaurant brands such as Friendly’s, Orange Leaf Frozen Yogurt, Red Mango, Smoothie Factory + Kitchen, Souper Salad, and Humble Donut Co.. In April 2024, Brix announced their most recent acquisition of the Clean Juice brand bringing their total portfolio unit count to over 300 locations. JAMCO is also a member of TriArtisan Partners, an investment group that owns TGI Fridays, where Antioco served as interim chairman and CEO in 2015. Through its investment in TriArtisan, JAMCO also holds interests in certain of TriArtisan’s other funds and portfolio brands including Energy Solutions, Dover Saddlery and C3 Creating Culinary Communities. Antioco was also CEO of P.F. Chang's, following the company's acquisition by TriArtisan Partners. In 2023, JAMCO acquired an interest in Fire Grounds Coffee Company, a Texas company founded by Paul Clarke, a Marine Corp Veteran and member of the Dallas Fire and Rescue, and Kyle Lund, an Army Veteran and member of the Dallas Fire and Rescue, with a mission to provide quality coffee to first responders. Antioco is currently Chairman of Brix Holdings, a position he has held since 2013.
