= Menchie's Frozen Yogurt =

American frozen yogurt chain restaurant

Menchie's

- Menchie's location at Universal CityWalk in Orlando, Florida
- Industry: Chain restaurant/Franchise
- Founded: May 15, 2007; 19 years ago San Fernando Valley, California
- Founders: Danna Caldwell; Adam Caldwell
- Headquarters: Encino, California, United States
- Key people: Amit Kleinberger (CEO)
- Products: Frozen yogurt, cakes, smoothies, juice
- Website: menchies.com

Menchie's Frozen Yogurt is an American frozen yogurt chain company founded in 2007, based in the San Fernando Valley, California, area. Menchie's offers self-serve frozen yogurt with different choices of yogurt flavors and toppings. Menchie's has 540 locations in the United States, Puerto Rico, Canada, the Bahamas, Kuwait, United Arab Emirates, Saudi Arabia, Qatar and Bangladesh.

== History ==
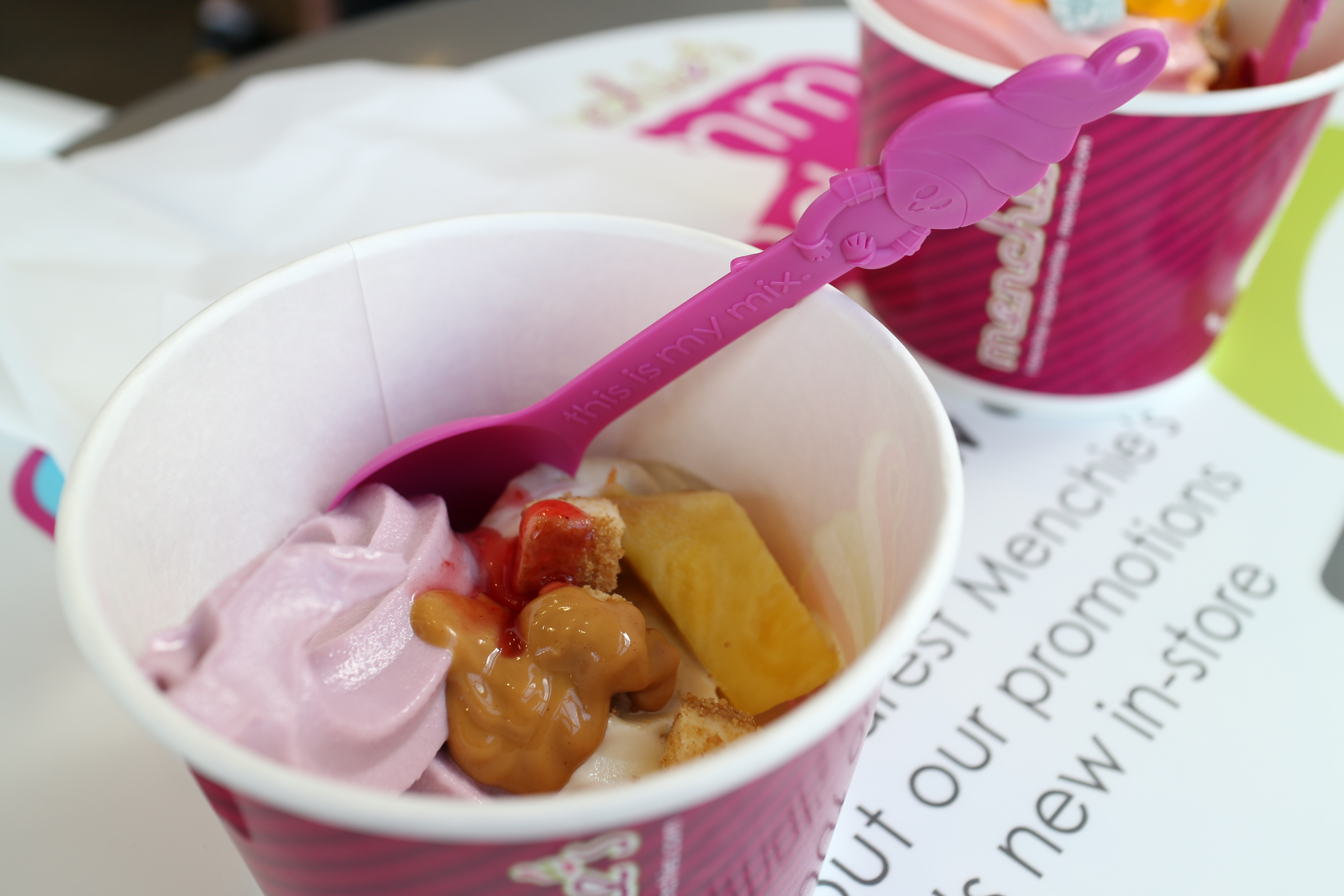
Menchie's Blueberry Cheesecake and Piña Colada Froyo

The first store was opened in Los Angeles on May 15, 2007, by Adam Caldwell and Danna Balas. The idea for a store originated from the couple's mutual love for yogurt. The name Menchie came from Adam's nickname for Danna, and it is also the name of their company's mascot.

== In popular culture ==
CEO Amit Kleinberger appeared in two episodes of Undercover Boss.

== See also ==
- List of frozen yogurt companies
- List of frozen dessert brands
