= Alshaya Group =

Kuwaiti retail franchise operator

Alshaya Group.
- Type: Private (Owned by the Alshaya family)
- Industry: Retail
- Founded: Part of Alshaya group of companies founded in 1890
- Headquarters: Kuwait City, Kuwait
- Area served: West Asia, North Africa, and Europe
- Key people: Mohammed Alshaya (Executive Chairman); John Hadden (CEO)
- Products: Franchising, Retail
- Owner: Alshaya family
- Divisions: Fashion and Footwear, Food, Health & Beauty, Pharmacy,Hospitality, Leisure & Entertainment
- Website: www.alshaya.com

Alshaya Group (also called the M. H. Alshaya Co.) is a multinational retail franchise operator headquartered in Kuwait. It operates nearly 50 consumer retail brands across the Middle East and North Africa, Turkey, and Europe. In addition to its retail operations, the Alshaya Group has holdings in real estate, construction, hotels, automotive and general trading, largely centered in the Middle East.

== History ==
=== 19th century ===
Alshaya is believed to be the oldest company in Kuwait. M.H Alshaya Co. was registered in 1890 and initially established trading links between Kuwait, Saudi Arabia and India. In 1890, M. H. Alshaya Co. was founded in Kuwait as a shipping company, initially trading with British India.

=== 20th century ===
In 1965, the company diversified by opening a Sheraton hotel in Kuwait City, the first Sheraton outside North America. In 1983, Alshaya expanded its franchising business when it acquired the Kuwait franchise rights for UK retailer Mothercare. H&M, In 1999, Alshaya entered the food retail sector with a partnership with Starbucks.

=== 21st century ===
==== 2000s ====
Alshaya's acquisition of the Topshop franchise for Turkey in 2002 was its first expansion outside the Middle East. The company moved into Russia in 2005 with the acquisition of the Russian franchise rights for Mothercare. In 2006, Alshaya launched international clothing retailer H&M in the Middle East, followed by a number of US-headquartered brands looking to expand into the Middle East: Dean and Deluca (2008), P. F. Chang's, Pinkberry and Payless ShoeSource (all 2009).

==== 2010s ====
In 2010, Alshaya added American Eagle to its portfolio. It also secured franchise rights for the first international outlets of Texas Roadhouse, and opened its first Victoria's Secret Beauty and Accessories stores in the Middle East in Bahrain and Kuwait. In June 2012, the first The Cheesecake Factory restaurant outside North America opened in the UAE. In November 2012, further brands were added to Alshaya's portfolio: Harvey Nichols Kuwait, Victoria's Secret, Jack Wills and COS.

In December 2012, Alshaya opened the Alshaya Retail Academy in Riyadh, Saudi Arabia, providing retail training and employment on graduation for young Saudi women. In February 2013 Alshaya opened up the 160th location of The Cheesecake Factory in The Avenues (Kuwait). In April 2014, Alshaya announced it would open two more Alshaya Retail Academies in Saudi Arabia, in Jeddah and Dammam. Alshaya moved into the Leisure and Entertainment sector in June 2013 with the opening of KidZania Kuwait, at The Avenues (Kuwait). Muji opened at The Avenues in the same year. Katsuya by Philippe Starck launched in Kuwait and the UAE, and in December 2013, more Alshaya restaurant brands were introduced to Saudi Arabia—The Cheesecake Factory, Texas Roadhouse, Shake Shack, P. F. Chang's and PizzaExpress. 2015 saw the Middle East debut of fast-food chicken restaurant Raising Cane's in Kuwait. In 2016, Alshaya launched its loyalty programme, Privileges Club, in Kuwait, with plans to roll the programme out across its GCC markets. Lebanese restaurant Babel opened its first outlet outside Lebanon, in Kuwait. In 2017, several new brands made their Middle Eastern debut, including Bouchon Bakery; Charlotte Tilbury; NYX Cosmetics; 400 Gradi; and & Other Stories. The company also opened the Four Seasons Hotel Kuwait at Burj Alshaya in downtown Kuwait City. Burj Alshaya features the 22-story Four Seasons in the Eastern Tower and houses the corporate headquarters of the company in the 43-story Western Tower. Also making their regional debut at Kuwait's new Avenues Phase IV extension were Swedish fashion brand Monki, Blaze Pizza and new entertainment concept TekZone. Luxury Home Fragrance brand Dr. Vranjes Firenze made its first Middle East foray later that year. In January 2019, Alshaya opened its own brand Amiti Noura, a restaurant that offers traditional Kuwaiti cuisine at Kuwait's largest shopping mall, The Avenues followed by the opening of contemporary New York city-based fashion brand alice + olivia by Stacey Bendet, in April.

Later that year, Alshaya Group partnered with Hilton to open 70 Hampton by Hilton Hotels in nine countries the Middle East, North Africa, Turkey and Russia. In December 2019, Alshaya signed an agreement with Equinox Group to bring three fitness brands to the region: Equinox Fitness Clubs, SoulCycle and Blink Fitness, with initial opening plans focused on Dubai in late 2020. It also announced plans to bring the Canopy by Hilton hotel brand to Kuwait. In early 2020, Alshaya introduced café and bakery Princi to Kuwait.

==== 2020s ====
In March 2022 Alshaya Group temporarily closed all stores in Russia (Starbucks, Mothercare, The Body Shop, Victoria's Secret), which might be connected to the international sanctions imposed against Russia because of its invasion of Ukraine.

That year, Alshaya introduced two home fashion brands in the region made in the UAE; Tribe of 6, and Cheekee Munkee, featuring everyday essentials for kids. This was followed by the launch of the new customer loyalty programme Aura in Qatar Kuwait, UAE and KSA. Later that year, Alshaya Technical, an entity of Alshaya Group was announced as the authorised and designated Master Distributor of Swiss Quality Coffee Equipment provider Thermoplan AG. The partnership highlighted the opening of the first Customer Experience Center in February, 2023.

In 2023, Alshaya unveiled the first Shake Shack drive-thru outside the US in the UAE and signed an agreement to become Chipotle's first ever franchise partner in the Middle East.

In April 2024, Alshaya opens doors to the Middle East's first-ever Chipotle at The Avenues in Kuwait. The new restaurant debuts the company's latest design format and offers a variety of in-restaurant ordering experiences. This was followed by the opening of the first Hampton by Hilton in Kuwait, in May. Located in the heart of Kuwait, in the Salmiya District, Hampton by Hilton Kuwait Salmiya boasts 110 modern and stylishly designed bedrooms.

== Operations ==
Some of the brands managed and operated by Alshaya Group include Raising Cane's, Mothercare, American Eagle, Harvey Nichols Kuwait, Payless ShoeSource, Topshop, Starbucks, Shake Shack, The Cheesecake Factory, Pinkberry, P. F. Chang's, Le Pain Quotidien, Katsuya by Philippe Starck, The Body Shop, Victoria's Secret, Boots pharmacy, and KidZania Kuwait. Its hotel division owns the Sheraton Hotel, which includes Four Seasons Hotel and Waldorf Astoria in Kuwait and the Oberoi Hotel in Medina, Saudi Arabia.

=== Debenhams (1997–2025) ===
In 1997, the British department store chain Debenhams expanded into the Middle East. The first location was in Bahrain, however by 2015, the Debenhams chain had expanded across Kuwait, Saudi Arabia, United Arab Emirates, Egypt, and Qatar. In 2021, the Debenhams chain collapsed into administration in the United Kingdom, with most of the previous franchise agreements in many other countries having collapsed before this; however, the Debenhams chain in the Middle East continued to be operated by Alshaya Group under license from Boohoo.com, who purchased the assets from liquidation. In December 2025, all remaining stores were closed.
