= Stephen A. Gaymont =

Hungarian bacteriologist

Stephen A. Gaymont (c. 1906 - December 16, 1994) was a Hungarian bacteriologist who was one of the pioneers in the United States yogurt market.

Born in Hungary, Gaymont received an undergraduate degree from Eötvös Loránd University and a PhD in bacteriology from the University of Pécs, and studied dairy science at Heidelberg University in Germany. As a student, Gaymont "was the fencing champion of Europe and would have been in the Olympics if he had not caught the flu". Gaymont fled Europe "with the help of a cousin in England only days before the outbreak of World War II". In 1939, he received a special visa to enter the United States from United States secretary of agriculture Henry A. Wallace. Gaymont began working on the production of yogurt in New York, but was unsuccessful there, probably due to competition from the newly created Dannon company. Gaymont relocated to Chicago in 1944, where he opened Gaymont Laboratories.

In addition to his introduction of yogurt to American markets, Gaymont has been credited with inventing frozen yogurt, whipped cream cheese, and low-fat sour cream, and pioneered the marketing of yogurt in single-serving containers, and of yogurt mixed with fruit. Gaymont "revolutionized the dairy business by introducing bacteriological health-control methods".

Splitting his later years between Chicago and Palm Beach, Florida, he died in 1994 in Chicago's Northwestern Memorial Hospital.
