= Blaze Pizza =

American fast-casual pizza chain

Blaze Pizza, LLC.

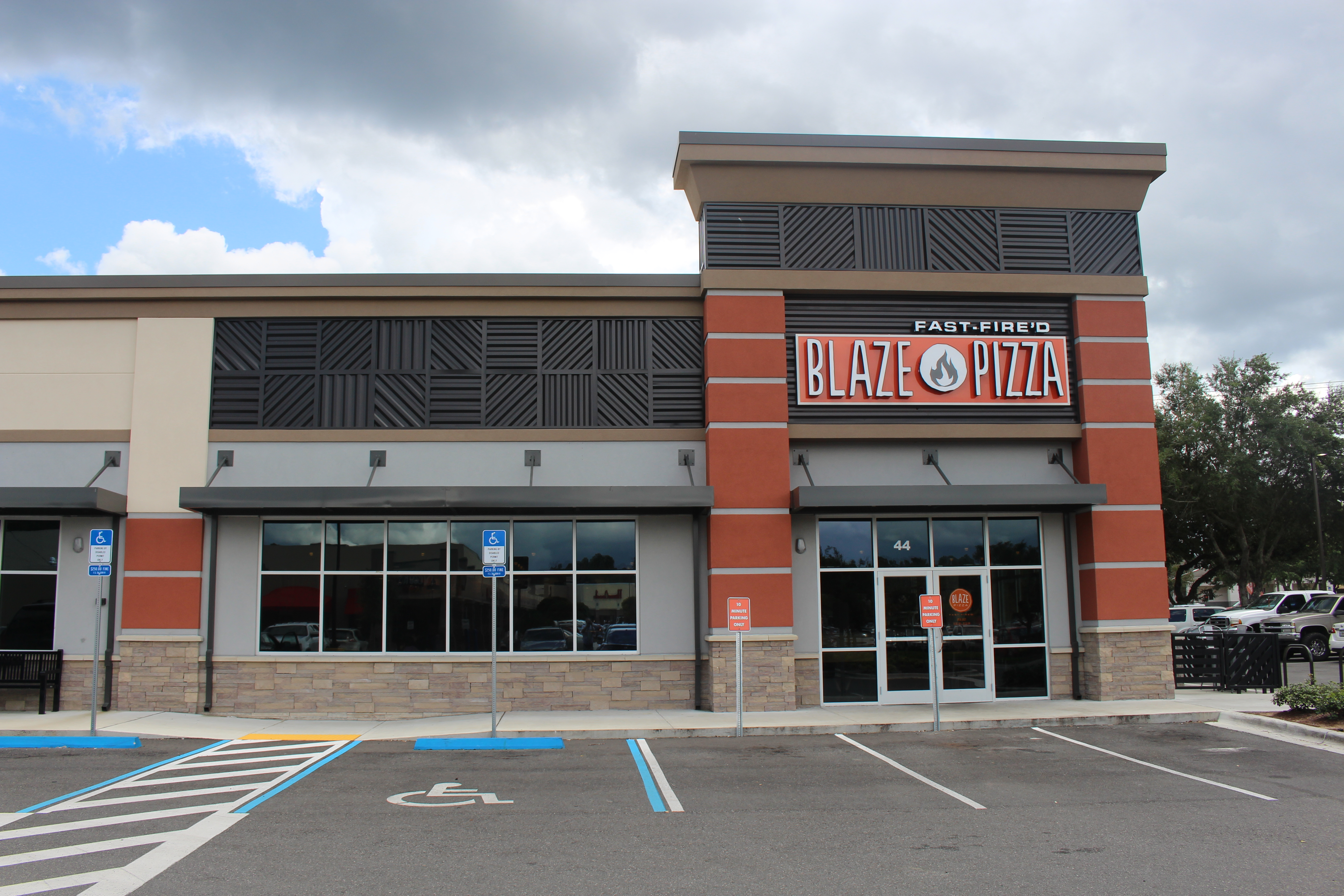
- Blaze Pizza in Tallahassee, Florida, U.S.
- Trade name: Blaze Pizza
- Type: Private
- Industry: Food and wine
- Genre: Fast-casual restaurant
- Founded: 2011; 15 years ago in Pasadena, California
- Founders: Elise and Rick Wetzel
- Headquarters: Atlanta, Georgia, United States
- Number of locations: 300+
- Area served: United States, Canada, Bahrain
- Key people: Rick Wetzel (Co-Founder); John Owen (CEO)
- Products: Pizza, salad, cheesy bread, desserts, drinks
- Website: blazepizza.com

Blaze Pizza is an Atlanta, Georgia–based fast-casual pizza restaurant chain. Founded in 2011 by Elise and Rick Wetzel of Wetzel's Pretzels, the chain is known for made-to-order pizzas.

== History ==
=== 2010s ===
Blaze Pizza was founded in Pasadena, California, by Rick and Elise Wetzel in 2011. The chain's first location was opened in Irvine, California, in August 2012, which was followed two months later by the opening of their second, and flagship store, location in October 2012 in Pasadena. The chain serves made-to-order pizzas, with a choice of various sauces and toppings. Its business model is similar to other chains such as Chipotle Mexican Grill and Subway. The pizzas are cooked in a high-temperature open-flame oven with an average cook time of three minutes. The only piece of cooking equipment inside each of the restaurants is an oven.

By the end of 2014, Blaze had become the first fast-casual pizza restaurant to achieve 50 opened units. The company planned to have at least 500 locations by 2020.

In 2015, the company began to expand into Canada. In partnership with Alshaya, the company opened locations in the Middle East in 2018.

=== 2020s ===
In 2024, the company announced its plans to move its headquarters to Atlanta, Georgia to support future expansion plans.

In January 2026, Blaze Pizza appointed John Owen as its chief executive officer, succeeding Beto Guajardo. Owen is the former chief operating officer of Scooter's Coffee. He previously was CEO of Subway Russia and spent three decades at McDonald's, where he rose to corporate vice president of strategy and execution.
