= Yogurtland =

American chain of frozen yogurt restaurants

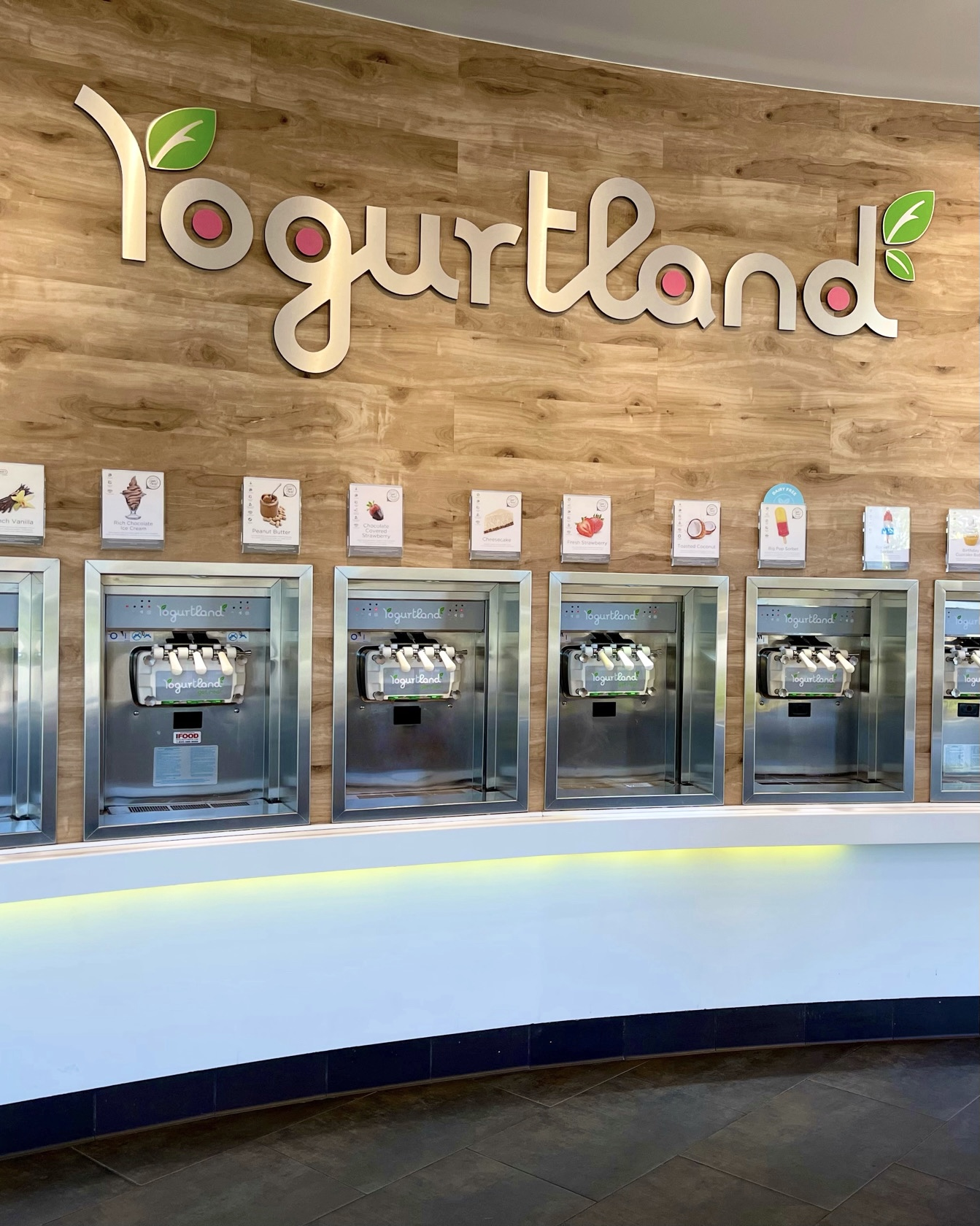
- The inside of Yogurtland
- Type: Private
- Industry: Chain restaurant Franchise
- Founded: Fullerton, California, U.S. in February 2006; 20 years ago
- Founder: Phillip Chang; Michelle Chang
- Headquarters: Farmers Branch, Texas, United States
- Number of locations: 231 as of February 2022
- Area served: United States, Guam, Myanmar, Oman, Saudi Arabia, Thailand, United Arab Emirates, Venezuela
- Key people: Phillip Chang (CEO); Michelle Chang (SVP Innovation)
- Products: Frozen yogurt Ice cream Sorbet; Plant-based; Toppings
- Website: www.yogurtland.com

Yogurtland is an international frozen yogurt franchise headquartered in Farmers Branch, Texas, U.S.. Yogurtland provides self-serve frozen yogurt with active cultures, as well as other frozen desserts such as ice cream, sorbet and plant-based treats that cater to a variety of dietary preferences. Yogurtland has stores in ten states in the United States as well as United Arab Emirates, Guam, Oman, and Thailand. The yogurt chain is considered to have pioneered the self-serve format, which gives guests the opportunity to customize their flavors and toppings.

== History ==
Yogurtland was founded in February 2006 by Phillip Chang, who is also the chain's CEO. The first Yogurtland location was in Fullerton, California. Yogurtland is the leading self-serve frozen yogurt franchise in the United States and was the first frozen yogurt company known to add fresh fruit to the toppings bar. Yogurtland has locations in Venezuela, Australia, Guam, United Arab Emirates, Oman, Singapore, Indonesia and Thailand. Yogurtland has been expanded via franchising which includes over 100 franchise partners.

On January 28, 2014, Yogurtland opened its first store in the Middle East at Dubai Mall in Dubai.

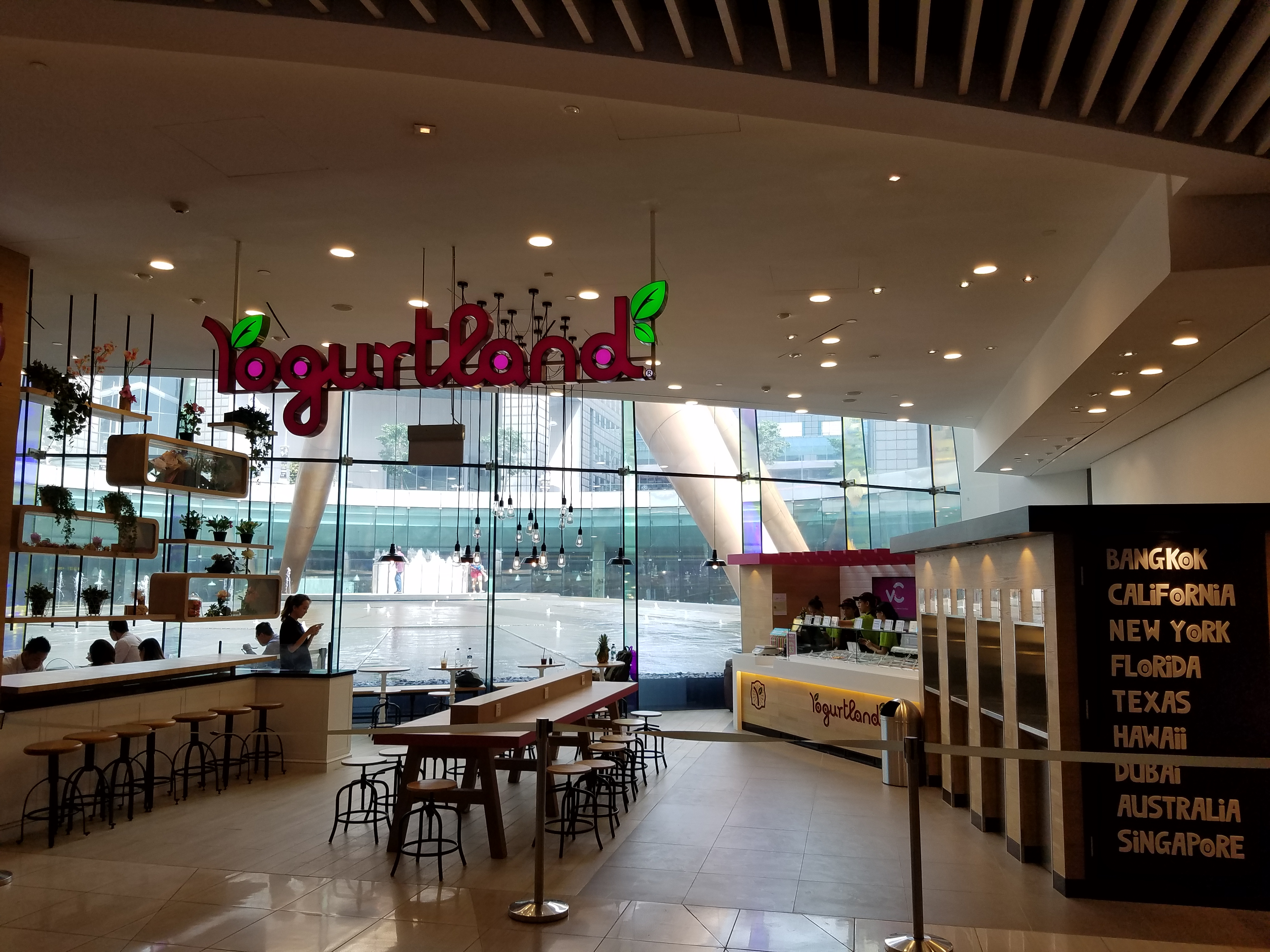
Yogurtland Suntec City Singapore

In 2016, Yogurtland partnered with Kung Fu Panda and Candy Crush, distributing collectible spoons of the different characters or icons weekly and released exclusive flavors.

On February 10, 2018, Yogurtland entered into Sultanate of Oman at Muscat City Centre.

On November 9, 2019, Yogurtland opened its first store in Indonesia at Lippo Mall Puri in West Jakarta.

In March 2020, Yogurtland temporarily suspended its indoor dining due to the COVID-19 pandemic and expanded its digital offerings through carryout and delivery.

On November 14, 2020, Yogurtland began its first fast casual concept called Holsom by Yogurtland in Huntington Beach, California. The opening marked the company's first location in California and its first fast-casual eatery concept nationwide.

In March 2021, the brand gave fans its first-ever oat milk flavor with the launch of plant-based cinnamon oatmeal cookie.

In May 2021, Yogurtland revamped its customer experience to bring customers an enhanced convenient and customized experienced through an update of its rewards program, mobile app, and online ordering capabilities. The new rewards program offers member benefits such as earning two points for every dollar spent, a $5 reward for every 100 points earned, a free birthday treat, three new Rewards tiers, and 50 bonus points upon signing up. Guests can place an order for delivery, in-store pickup, or catering.

In the summer of 2021, Yogurtland launched limited-time fruit bowl fusions and acai bowls.

On November 15, 2023, Yogurtland Indonesia announced on its official Instagram account the upcoming closure of its final outlet at Senayan Park (SPARK) in Jakarta. The store's operations concluded on January 2, 2024, followed by a final farewell post on January 7, 2024, marking the end of the brand's four-year presence in Indonesia.

== Products ==
At any time, Yogurtland stores have up to 16 flavors in rotation, and more than 200 flavors have been created. Customers may mix and combine flavors in their cups by pulling on handles that control the yogurt machines.

Yogurtland provides an array of dietary offerings in its flavor options including dairy-free, sugar-free, low-fat, non-fat, gluten-free and vegan. Additionally, approximately 30 toppings, including fresh-cut fruits, chocolate bits, gummies, cookies, nuts, granola and syrups are available at the toppings bar to complement the frozen yogurt. Prices for products are per ounce and vary by location.

== See also ==
- List of frozen dessert brands
- List of frozen yogurt companies
