= TCBY =

American chain of frozen yogurt stores

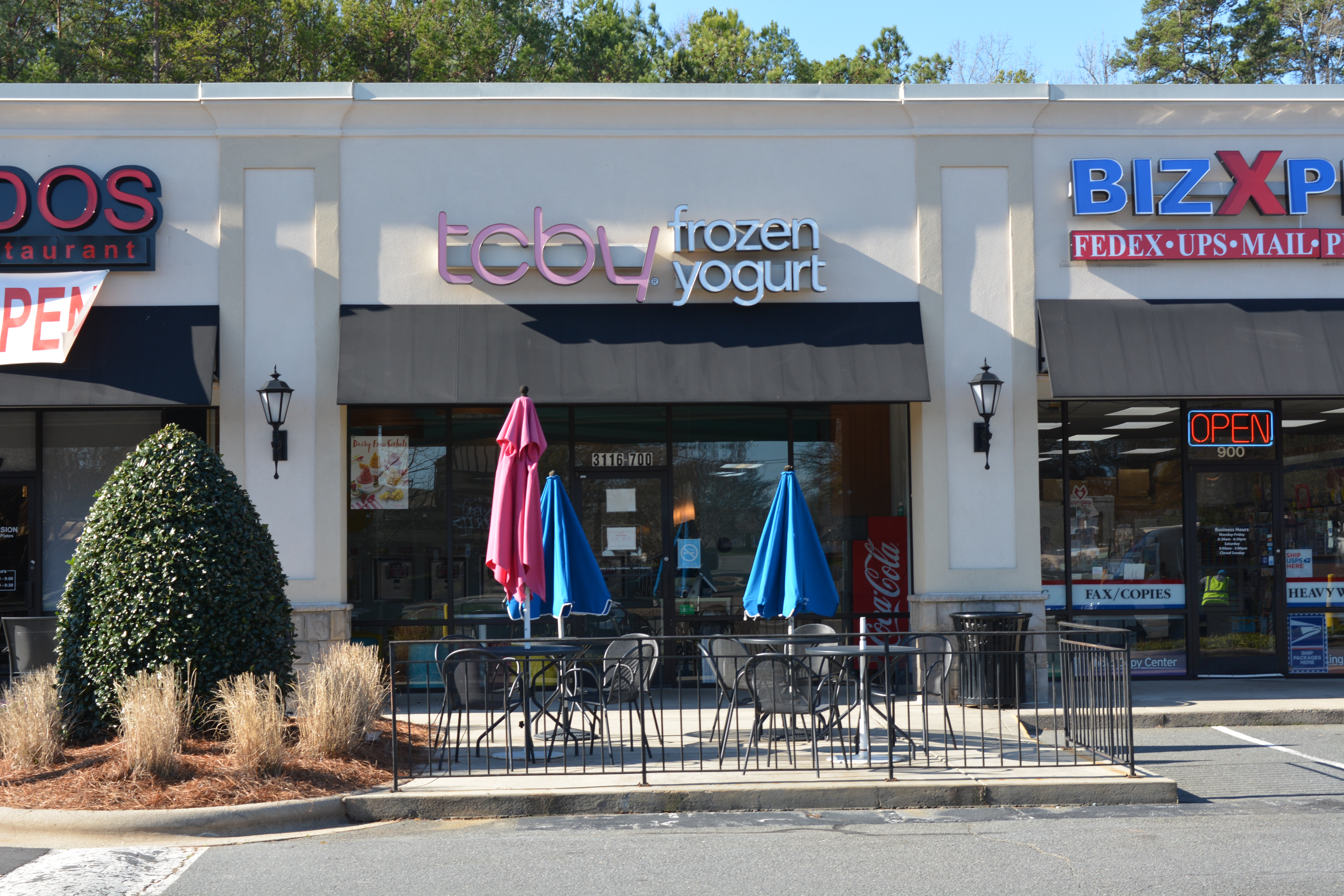
- A TCBY in Matthews, North Carolina
- Type: Subsidiary
- Industry: Chain restaurant/Franchise
- Founded: 1981; 45 years ago in Little Rock, Arkansas
- Headquarters: Broomfield, Colorado, United States
- Number of locations: 129
- Key people: Joe Lewis CEO
- Products: Frozen yogurt / Ice cream
- Parent: Mrs. Fields (2000–present)
- Website: tcby.com

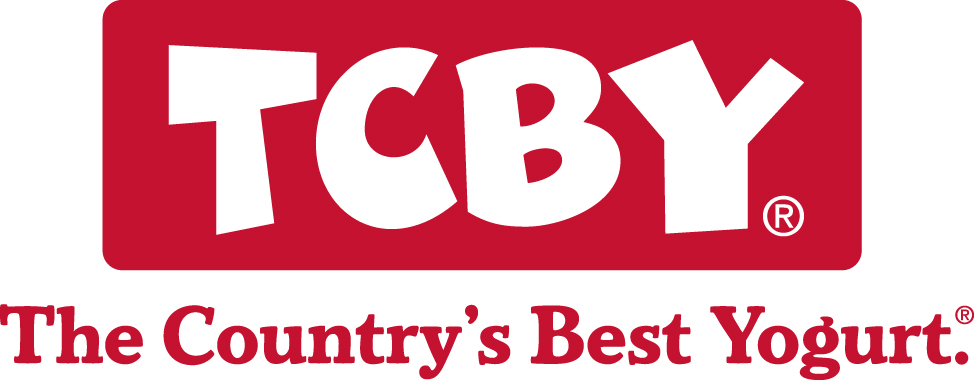
Logo previously used by TCBY

TCBY (The Country's Best Yogurt) is an American chain of frozen yogurt stores. It is one of the largest U.S. retailers of soft-serve frozen yogurt.

== History ==
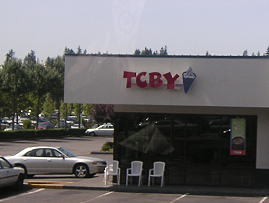
A TCBY in 2006 using the former logo in Lynnwood, Washington

In 1981, Frank D. Hickingbotham (b. 1936) opened the first TCBY in Little Rock, Arkansas. TCBY began franchising the following year, and had expanded to over 100 locations by 1984.

Prior to 1984, the company's name was "This Can't Be Yogurt," but a lawsuit from a competitor, I Can't Believe It's Yogurt!, forced TCBY to create a new name from its initials, eventually using "The Country's Best Yogurt". TCBY began co-branding with Taco Bell, McDonald's, Subway, and Burger King in 1995.

In 1991 TCBY moved into the tallest building in Arkansas, the forty-story Simmons Tower located in downtown Little Rock, and the building was renamed The TCBY Tower until 2000 when TCBY vacated.

Mrs. Fields acquired TCBY in early 2000 and became Mrs. Fields Famous Brands. The combined company relocated headquarters to Broomfield, Colorado in 2012.

TCBY was also present in Honduras, Costa Rica and Nicaragua for several years, but closed all of its branches.

In 2001, there were 1,777 TCBY locations across the United States. By 2011, after several waves of closings, there were 405.

== Products and promotions ==
TCBY offers frozen yogurt in a variety of flavors. The chain typically serves hard scooped and soft serve yogurt, while newer concept stores only offer soft serve. The new concept stores follow a self-service model, with customers being charged by weight. Soft serve yogurt comes in Golden Vanilla, Chocolate, and White Chocolate Mousse flavors, in addition to various rotating flavors. TCBY also serves drinks such as Berriyo yogurt smoothies and Frappe Chillers.

In September 2010, TCBY announced the test launch of breakfast and lunch meal replacement bowls, parfaits and smoothies made from non-frozen "fresh" yogurt called Yovana-Simply Yogurt in two self-service company stores in its headquarters of Salt Lake City.

2010 also saw the opening of a prototype store in Salt Lake City, operating under a different business model. Instead of customers ordering and being served in a traditional fashion, they serve themselves using any combination of available yogurt flavors, add their own mix of fruit or candy toppings, and pay by the ounce.

In May 2011, TCBY launched Super Fro-Yo, a reformulated version of its yogurt with a more nutrient-rich profile. The company brought down the fat content of its yogurt to below 2 percent, so it can be labeled low fat. On January 10, 2012, TCBY launched a Greek frozen yogurt product. TCBY is the first frozen yogurt chain to offer Greek frozen yogurt.

Every year, TCBY offers mothers across the nation a free frozen yogurt on Mother's Day, and fathers a free frozen yogurt on Father's Day.

=== Store giveaway ===
In October 2009, TCBY launched the "This Could Be Yours: The Great TCBY Store Giveaway," a contest that rewarded one person with their own TCBY store. To enter, contestants submitted a video, no longer than two minutes, explaining why they should be the recipient of their very own TCBY, why their town is the perfect location, and what they have to offer the brand. Submissions were judged on creativity, a sense of business acumen and originality. Originally, videos were accepted until November 30, 2009, but the deadline was extended until March 31, 2010. On May 26, 2010, it was announced that the winners of the contest were Jared and Sarah Greer of Fayetteville, Arkansas. The Greers opened their store in April 2011 in Rogers, Arkansas with TCBY's new self-serve prototype and store design.

== See also ==
- List of frozen yogurt companies
- List of frozen dessert brands
