= Llaollao =

Spanish frozen yogurt franchise brand

llaollao
- Type: Private
- Industry: Restaurant
- Genre: Ice cream parlor
- Founded: 2009
- Founder: Pedro Espinosa
- Headquarters: Murcia, Spain
- Number of locations: 390+
- Area served: 17 countries
- Products: Frozen yogurt, smoothie, slush, parfait
- Website: llaollaoweb.com

llaollao (pronounced as "yao yao") is a Spanish multinational restaurant chain specializing in frozen yogurt, founded in Denia in the province of Alicante, Spain. Currently, llaollao is present in 17 countries on four continents including several countries in Europe, Latin America and Asia.

As of October 2025, llaollao is present in more than 390 locations.

== History ==
In 2009, Pedro Espinosa left his job at BP to continue his family's business tradition in the world of gastronomy and opened the first llaollao outlet in Murcia, Spain. A year later, he expanded the business based on the franchising model. Currently, the company that incorporates healthy values (a medium-sized tub contains 46% of the Calcium Recommended Daily Allowance) and a fresh image, is a leader among its competitors. By July 2015, Llaollao had generated a total of 1,000 jobs during the five years that have passed since it launched its franchise model to the market. In 2016, llaollao commenced a 70-outlet expansion in Japan.

On 7 December 2017, D+1 terminated its master franchisee with llaollao Singapore and rebranded its 29 stores to another frozen yogurt brand named Yole. llaollao Singapore later released a statement on Facebook stating that "we are far from finished in Singapore" and announced its intent to return to the Singapore market.

On 16 June 2018, llaollao Singapore returned under a new master franchise under Manna. With strong demand, more outlets have been opened by the end of 2018.

On 16 November 2018, llaollao opened its first US outlet at the Houston Galleria. This location is a Petit location so it does not offer the full-range menu as the llaollao stores in Spain, however, it still offers the tubs, sanums and in October 2019, introduced the fondue and the smoothies.

== Products ==
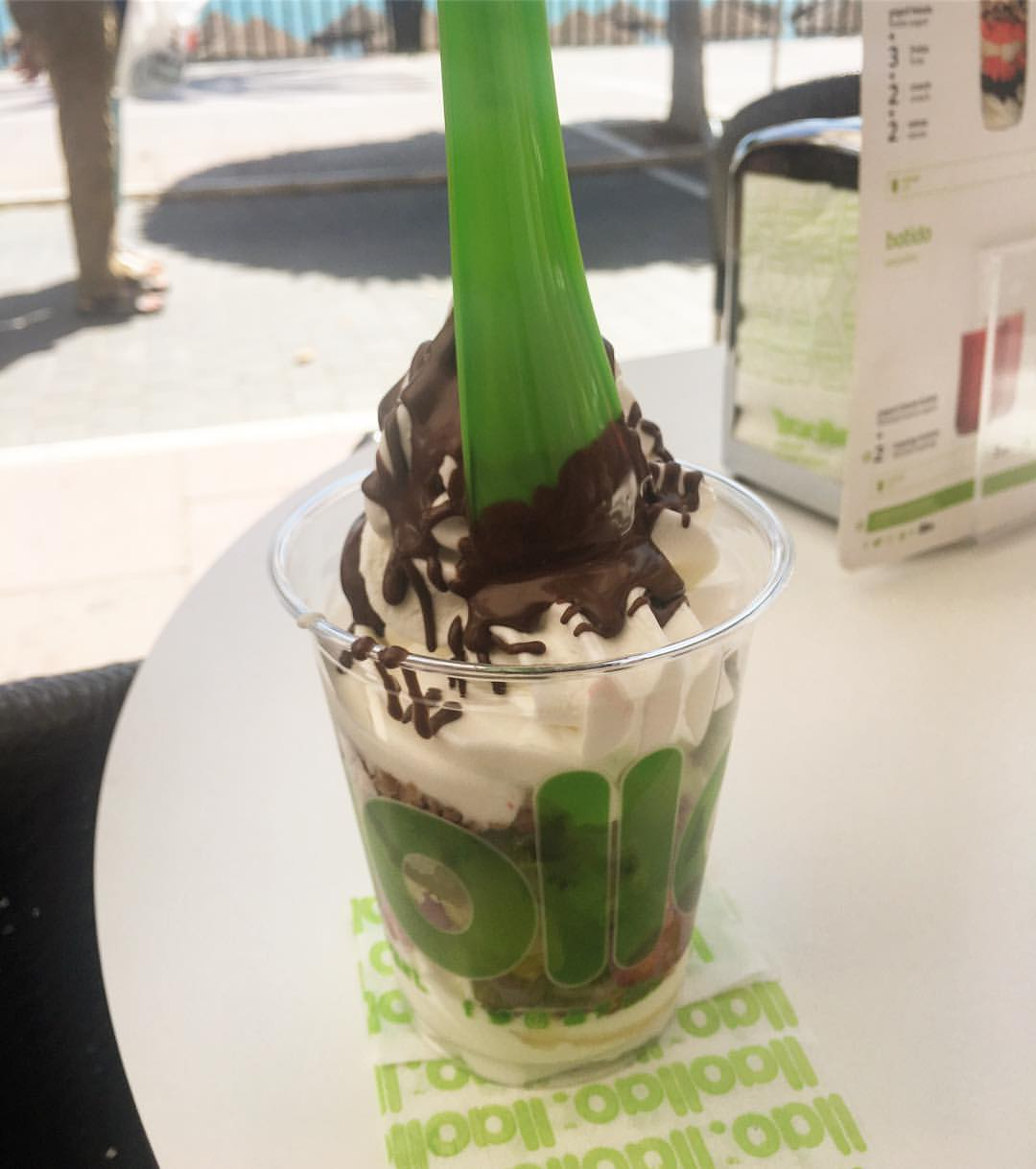
Sanum frozen yogurt

llaollao is natural frozen yogurt made from skimmed milk and combined with a choice of toppings from freshly chopped seasonal fruits to cereals, crunchy toppings and a selection of sauces. llaollao's signature offering is the Sanum which is essentially a yogurt parfait with fresh fruits of choice, granola or crushed biscuits drizzled with sauce. In July 2015, Llaollao enlarged its menu and included products allowed for gluten intolerants such as green apple and passion fruit sauces as well as chocolate and candied almonds crunches. llaollao also utilises biodegradable cups and napkins made out of recycled materials in their effort to contribute to improving the environment.

== Awards ==
In 2013, llaollao was blank as one of 12 best business concepts of the year by the Sandwich & Snack Show Academy and presented the Best Newcomer award by the Actualidad Económica magazine, Spain's leading publication in the fields of economics and business. In 2014, llaollao was acknowledged with the Startex award jointly awarded by the Spanish Institute for Foreign Trade (ICEX) and the Ministry of Economy and Competitiveness of Spain. llaollao has been recognised by three major food safety certificates by the world's leading company for health, safety and regulatory standards' inspection, verification, testing and certification, SGS.
