= Pinkberry =

American frozen dessert chain

- Type: Subsidiary
- Industry: Restaurants
- Founded: January 2005; 21 years ago in West Hollywood, California
- Founder: Shelly Hwang; Young Lee
- Headquarters: Scottsdale, Arizona, USA
- Number of locations: 260 restaurants
- Area served: Bahrain, Canada, Egypt, Gabon, Ghana, Japan, Jordan, Kuwait, Iraq, Liberia, Libya, Nigeria, Oman, Panama, Peru, Philippines, Qatar, Saudi Arabia, Thailand, Turkey, United Arab Emirates, Lebanon, United Kingdom, United States, Cameroon
- Key people: Eric Lefebvre, CEO
- Products: Frozen yogurt Smoothies; Fruit Parfait; Fresh Fruit Bowl
- Owner: MTY Food Group
- Parent: Kahala Brands (2015–present)
- Website: pinkberry.com

Pinkberry is a franchise of frozen dessert restaurants headquartered in Scottsdale, Arizona. There are currently over 260 stores in 20 countries. The first store was opened in January 2005 by Hye Kyung (Shelly) Hwang and Young Lee. The restaurant allows customers to customize their yogurt with a variety of toppings.

== History ==
Hwang's first business venture was to open a formal English teahouse on a tiny residential street called Huntley Drive in West Hollywood, California. However, after the city refused to approve an alcohol permit for Hwang and her business partner, architect Young Lee, they decided to go with their second plan, which was a frozen yogurt concept reviving the craze of the 1980s. People were soon driving across town and standing in line for up to 20 to 30 minutes to get their fix of "the taste that launched 1,000 parking tickets." The second store opened in August 2006 and the third one on La Brea and Melrose avenues in early September 2006. After, stores began springing up all over Southern California and also branches in New York. In October 2009, Pinkberry opened its first overseas branch in the State of Kuwait at the Avenues shopping mall.

Pinkberry initially marketed its product as frozen yogurt. Following tests that found Pinkberry's dessert did not have enough bacterial cultures per ounce to meet the definition of frozen yogurt under California state law, the company was sued in 2007. According to tests run by the Los Angeles Times, Pinkberry's product contained 69,000 bacterial cultures per gram, compared to 200,000 per gram for Baskin Robbins. In response, Pinkberry altered the jingle on played on their website to remove references to the product being "yogurt", and removed claimed health benefits of yogurt from the walls of stores. The National Yogurt Association established a certification for "Live and Active culture" frozen yogurt, requiring 10 million cultures per gram at manufacture. In 2008, following a change in their formula, Pinkberry received the Live and Active Cultures Seal.

On October 16, 2007, the firm took in a $27.5 million investment from Maveron, the venture fund founded by Starbucks founder Howard Schultz, to expand the firm's concept nationwide. On May 1, 2009, Pinkberry announced its plans to expand its market both internationally and domestically, after receiving $9 million in second-round funding from investors. As part of its plans, Pinkberry has partnered with Kuwaiti retail conglomerate M.H. Alshaya Co. to open stores in several countries in the Middle East and signed with HMSHost to open locations in airports nationwide, the first of which will open in the late summer 2009. In 2010, the company expanded in the Southern United States. In April 2010, the original Pinkberry store in West Hollywood, still lacking adequate parking, was closed and converted into an administrative building for the chain.

After poor sales and several store closures from over-expansion, in December 2015 Kahala Brands acquired Pinkberry as their 18th brand. There is no information on how much the co-founders received. As of 2015, Shelly Hwang is the Chief Product Officer and Board Director of Pinkberry.

== Branding and placement ==
The Pinkberry brand has been designed and managed by LA-based branding firm Ferroconcrete. Pinkberry has been featured in an episode of HBO's Curb Your Enthusiasm (season 8, episode 5, 'Vow of Silence') and in an episode of 2021’s “And Just Like That” (season 1, episode 3, ‘When in Rome’). Mentioned in the Comedy Central cartoon Ugly Americans (season 2, episode 9, 'Lilly and the Beast'), mentioned in two episodes of the TBS animated sitcom American Dad (season 6, episode 17, 'Home Wrecker' and season 11, episode 2, 'The Life Aquatic with Steve Smith'), and in a few scenes of the 2014 film Still Alice. Pinkberry was featured in the Broadway musical Be More Chill, and mentioned in the novel November 9 by Colleen Hoover, and in the 2014 film Horrible Bosses 2.

== Gallery ==
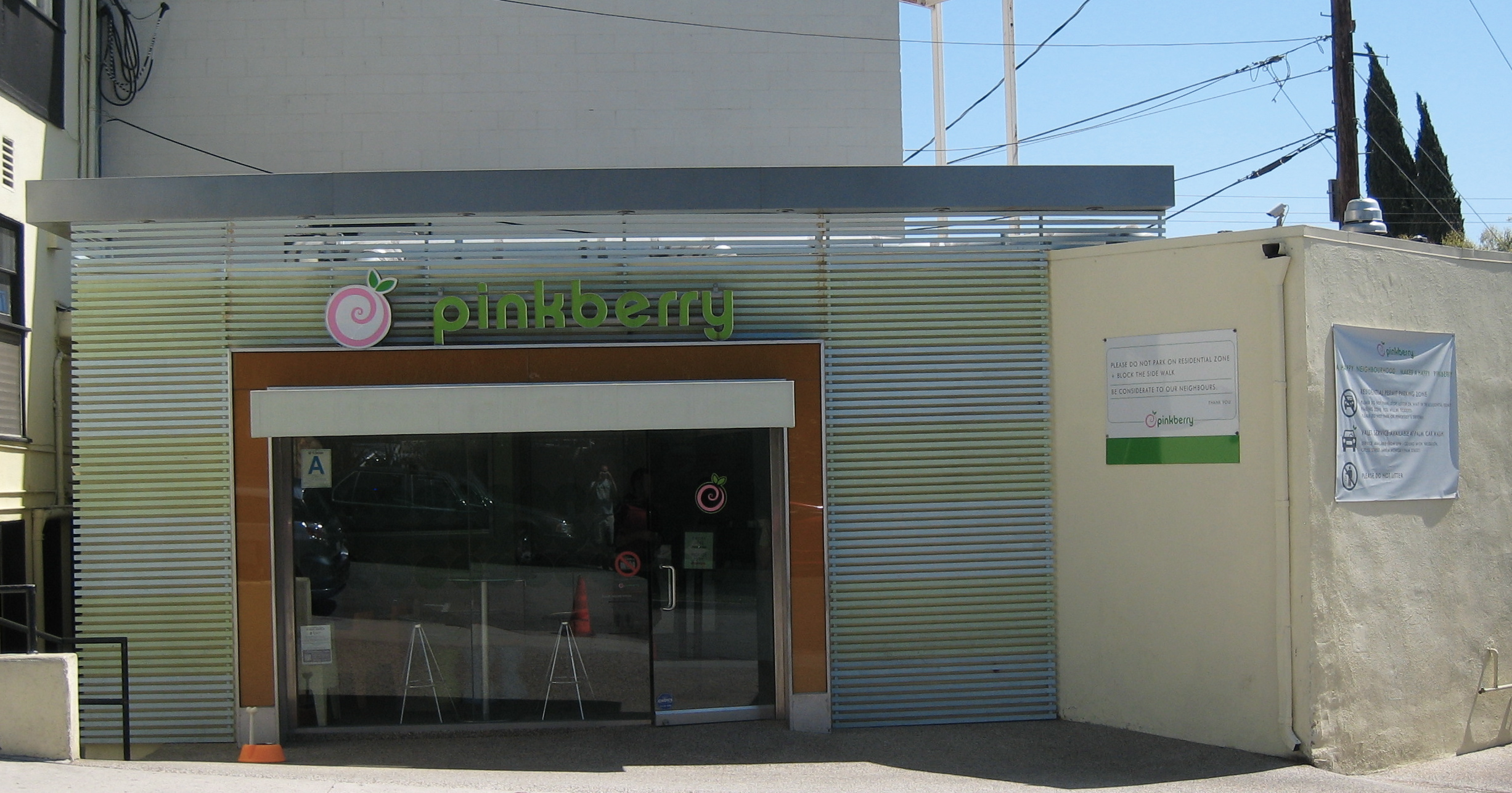
The original Pinkberry restaurant on Huntley Drive near Santa Monica Boulevard in West Hollywood, California

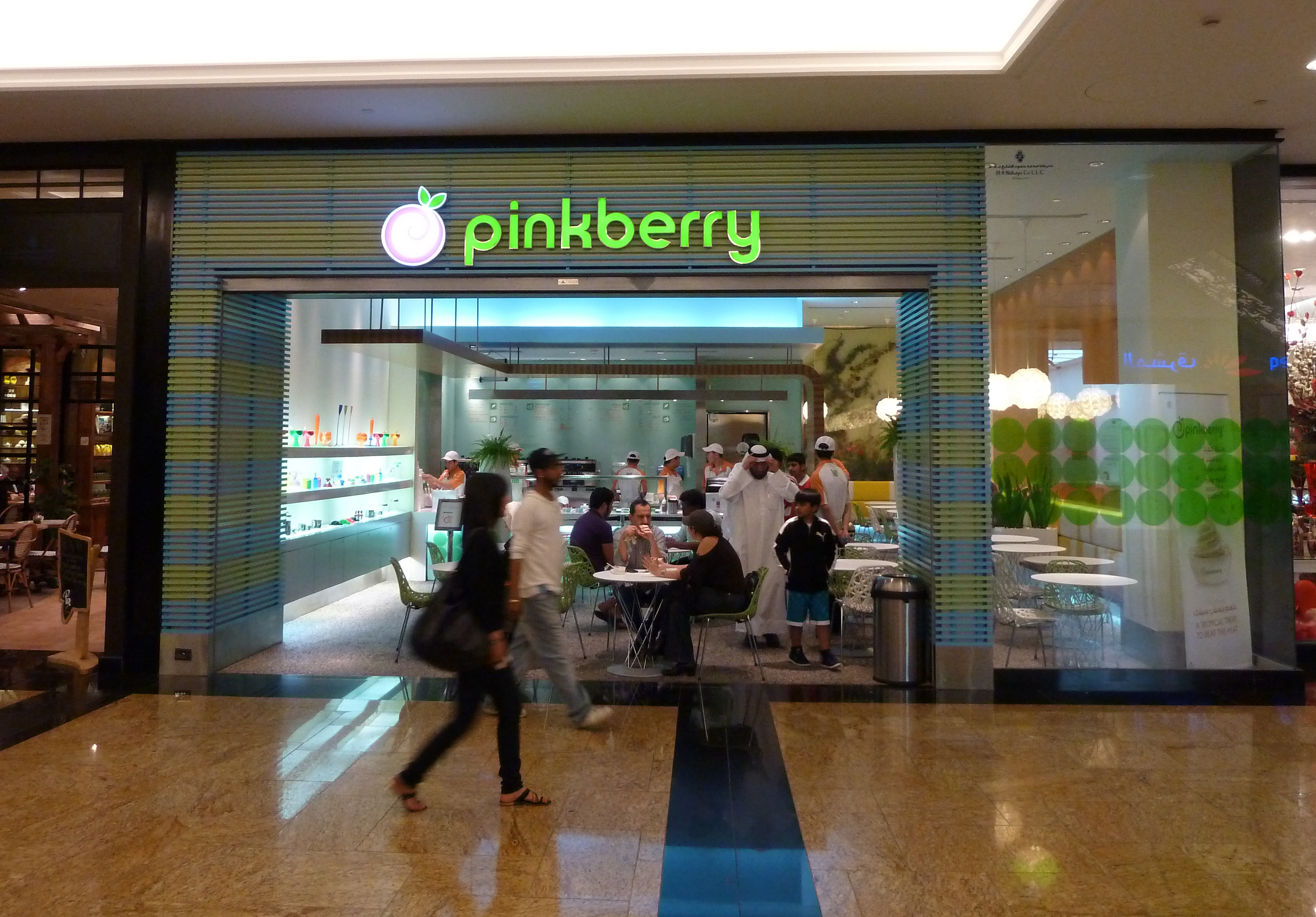
A Pinkberry location in the Mall of the Emirates, Dubai

== See also ==
- List of frozen dessert brands

== Bibliography ==
- Yoshino, Kimi (May 10, 2007). "Pinkberry in Culture Clash". Los Angeles Times.
