= Frozen yogurt =

Frozen dairy dessert

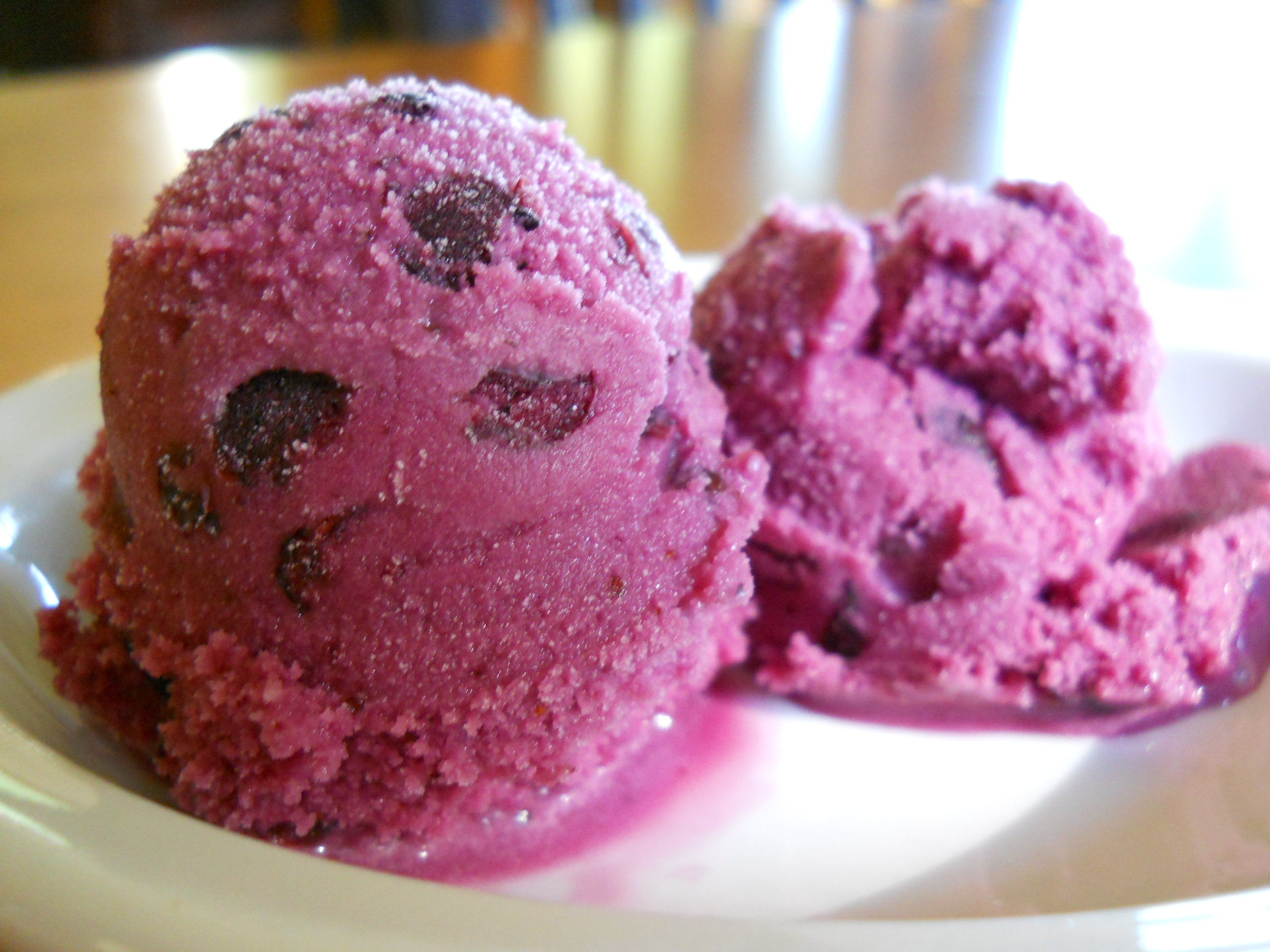
- Soft-serve frozen yogurt with fruit and granola Blueberry frozen yogurt
- Alternative names: Frozen yoghurt (British English); Frogurt; Fro-yo
- Course: Dessert
- Place of origin: United States
- Serving temperature: −20 to −6 °C (−4 to 21 °F) depending on type
- Main ingredients: Milk; Sweetener; Yogurt culture

Frozen yogurt (Note: Spelled frozen yoghurt in British English. Also known as frogurt or fro-yo (/ˈfroʊjoʊ/ FROH-yoh).) is a frozen dessert, usually made with yogurt as its primary ingredient. Frozen yogurt is similar in composition to ice cream, with its main ingredient being milk or milk substitute.

Frozen yogurt for retail sale is typically manufactured from a mixture of milk ingredients, sweeteners, stabilizers, and yogurt cultures. After fermentation, the mixture is cooled, aged, flavored, and frozen while air is introduced to improve texture and flavor. The product may be distributed as soft serve, or hardened for serving by the scoop. It is commonly eaten with toppings such as candy pieces, fruit, nuts, chocolate, or syrup.

Branded frozen yogurt products were marketed in the United States from the late 1960s and 1970s. They became widely popular in the United States in the 1980s as a lower-fat alternative to ice cream, declined during the 1990s, and had a resurgence around 2005-2014 involving tart flavors and self-serve shops.

== Description ==
The Encyclopedia of Food Sciences and Nutrition defines frozen yogurt as:

A fermented milk or yogurt mix containing a typical yogurt flavor and has been subjected to fermentation by the two yogurt bacteria to a pH of 4.5 or lower or a titratible acidity of 0.9% or higher, expressed as lactic acid.

As of 2013, most countries do not have regulatory standards for frozen yogurt. In the United States, the term frozen yogurt is not strictly defined by a federal standard of identity unlike yogurt or ice cream, but standards for frozen yogurt exist in at least 15 U.S. states as of 2013. Many frozen yogurt products sold in the United States are primarily ice cream blended with a small amount of yogurt.

Frozen yogurt with Oreo crumbs

The government of the Netherlands defines frozen yogurt as having at least 70% yogurt content with a pH of 5.0 or lower, while the government of Australia defines it as having at least 45% yogurt content with a pH of 4.5 or lower.

=== Types and presentation ===
A "Classic" frozen yogurt sundae from Menchie's

Frozen yogurt is produced in a variety of flavors. Some types of frozen yogurt are more tart in taste, whereas other variations may be sweeter and more similar in taste to ice cream.

Frozen yogurt is typically eaten from bowls or cups. Frozen yogurt can also be served as a cone, a sandwich or a bar, and is sometimes artistically molded, for example to resemble fruit. It is sometimes substituted for ice cream in frozen blended drinks.

=== Dietary restrictions ===
Some frozen yogurt is vegan. Dairy-free frozen yogurt is produced using a plant-based beverage, or plant milk, such as coconut, almond, oat, or soy milk, as its primary base. Frozen yogurt is also sold in halal and kosher varieties.

== History ==
=== Early history ===
A frozen yogurt store in Moab, Utah

Frozen yogurt was available in the United States by 1951, when a piece in the Idaho Statesman reported that "there's even a place for health fans in the ice cream world. Most popular is the frozen yogurt that comes in many delicious flavors." Yogurt had reached the US in the late 19th century, but only came to the attention of the broader US market in the 1920s, 1930s and 1940s, through the work of firms like Colombo Yogurt and Gaymont Laboratories Inc. of Stephen A. Gaymont. By August 1969, Gaymont Laboratories was selling a frozen yogurt product under the name "Yogo", with plans to sell it nationally. Upon Gaymont's death, several obituaries credited Yogo as the first frozen yogurt, and Gaymont as its creator.

=== 1960s–1970s ===
Several sources propose that frozen yogurt was invented in the United States during the latter half of the 1960s or early 1970s. In one account, the Bloomingdale's department store commissioned Massachusetts dairy producer HP Hood to develop a low-fat alternative to ice cream in the early 1970s. The resulting product, marketed as Frogurt, was served at Bloomingdale's Forty Carrots restaurant in New York City by 1972. Companies such as Danone and Häagen-Dazs were selling frozen yogurt in shops by 1976, often offering added toppings or mix-ins. HP Hood began distributing the product throughout the United States in 1977. In the Chicago area, frozen yogurt was already available in 1977 in supermarkets, restaurants, and storefront shops. In 1978, Boston-based ice cream shop Brigham's Ice Cream created a packaged frozen yogurt, called Humphreez Yogart. (Note: The American food and drink website Tasting Table identifies this as the first packaged frozen yogurt.) The term "Fro-Yo" emerged in this era.

=== 1980s–1990s ===
Demand for frozen yogurt in the United States expanded during the 1980s, as consumers sought out health foods and low-fat alternatives to ice cream. Between 1985 and 1989, sales in the US grew sixfold to US$1.2 billion, and by the following year frozen yogurt accounted for 14% of all frozen dessert sales. Market research credited chains with much of this growth: McDonald's replaced ice cream with frozen yogurt, and ice cream chains such as Dairy Queen and Baskin-Robbins added it to their menus. In chains such as TCBY and Tasti D-Lite, sweetened frozen yogurt resembling soft serve became available. In The New York Times, the frozen yogurt of the end of the decade was reportedly much less tart than it was earlier, as manufacturers reduced the yogurt content, and quoted a food scientist as saying "frozen yogurt has lost its yogurt".

Frozen yogurt was not regulated by any specific guidelines during the period. In 1991, the FDA proposed establishing a federal standard of identity for frozen yogurt but the agency formally withdrew the proposed rule due to a lack of industry consensus and shifting priorities. Most frozen yogurt of the time contained between 0 and 4% fat. Consumption continued to grow into the 1990s. Consumption per capita in America increased from 1.2 pounds (0.54 kg) in 1987 to 4.4 pounds (2.0 kg) in 1992, as ice cream consumption dipped. Peak sales came in 1994, reaching US$1.7 billion, and subsequently contracted; in figures from the International Dairy Foods Association, annual US production in 2005 had almost halved from the approximately 117 million US gallons (440 ML) made in 1990. Industry analysts later described the first boom as one in which mall-based chains multiplied, competed for the same customers, and then collapsed. (Note: From 1981 to late 1988, TCBY expanded from one store to over a thousand.)

=== 2000s–2010s ===
A Red Mango store, Koreatown, New York, 2008

Tart frozen yogurt experienced a comeback throughout the 2000s. An early store specializing in tart frozen yogurt during the decade was Pinkberry, started in 2005 in West Hollywood, California. After a 2007 lawsuit accused Pinkberry's products of failing to meet California's standards for frozen yogurt, Pinkberry dropped all yogurt branding until 2008, when the lawsuit was settled and Pinkberry officially became "frozen yogurt". Red Mango entered the U.S. market in 2006. Pinkberry opened two more locations in its second year and attracted venture capital, including a US$27.5 million investment from a fund started by Howard Schultz.

The increasing ubiquity of tart frozen yogurt chain shops led to an expansion in the number of self-service frozen yogurt shops. In 2008, the New York City shop 16 Handles was one of the earliest stores to provide sweeter varieties, which were preferred over the previous flavors. The growing availability of sweeter varieties overall contributed to a shift away from the tart flavors of the mid-2000s. The format was easy to copy, requiring little more than a storefront and a few soft-serve machines; many shops let customers serve themselves and charged by the ounce. Franchising, suppliers of frozen yogurt mix, and would-be owners seeking small businesses after the Great Recession drove rapid expansion, especially between 2011 and 2014.

The expansion of the frozen yogurt industry was supported by the investment of private equity in chains and the growth of franchising. According to market research firm IBISWorld, the number of frozen yogurt shops in the United States increased from an estimated 983 in 2007 to approximately 1,227 in 2016. IBISWorld estimated that the industry would generate approximately US$800 million in revenue in 2013. During this period, private equity firms invested in chains including TCBY, Red Mango, and Sweet Frog.

In 2013, the frozen yogurt market was described by the Wall Street Journal as an oversaturated "retail kudzu" due to the rapid proliferation of identical businesses. By 2014, growth in the frozen yogurt industry had begun to slow amid increasing competition and concerns about market saturation. Some chains diversified their offerings, introducing products such as juices and other desserts. Pinkberry peaked at 154 locations in 2014 and had 71 by the end of 2021, while several other chains fell by 60% or more from their peaks, mostly through closures. According to market research firm Circana, the number of American frozen yogurt stores declined 35% from 2017 to 2024.

=== 2020s–present ===
Frozen yogurt became popular again in the mid-2020s, a period that journalist Rachel Kurzius called a "third wave". Earlier booms had emphasized what frozen yogurt lacked, such as fat and calories; marketing in the 2020s instead stressed protein, live cultures and other added ingredients, and some brands used Greek yogurt or kefir. Writers also linked the trend to nostalgia and social media.

In the United States, the number of frozen yogurt servings sold between March 2025 and March 2026 increased by 26% compared with the preceding year, according to Circana. Sales of pre-packaged frozen yogurt also increased by 24% over the same period, according to NIQ. Journalists writing about queues at New York City frozen yogurt stores noted that people standing in line often socialized with each other, and connected the trend to the decline of third places in the United States.

== Nutritional content ==
The nutritional value of frozen yogurt can vary, as the added sugar, serving size, protein content, and ingredients may differ, with some brands containing higher amounts of added sugar or saturated fat. The addition of toppings, such as fresh fruit, candies, and sauces, also increases the caloric total. Because formulations differ, products that appear similar can vary considerably in sugar and fat content. Reporting since the 1970s has described frozen yogurt as lower in fat than ice cream, though some products have nearly as many calories.

While frozen yogurt may contain live and active bacterial cultures, it generally contains fewer active cultures than regular yogurt. This is because commercial freezing processes place the microorganisms into a dormant state, and some bacteria lose viability during prolonged cold storage. The survival of these cultures depends on the bacterial strains, manufacturing methods, storage temperature, and how long the product is stored. Some products sold as frozen yogurt do not contain live cultures due to the yogurt base being heat-treated, which kills the cultures. Other manufacturers use yogurt powder to recreate the tart flavor without adding bacterial cultures.

Probiotic organisms, such as Bifidobacterium and L. acidophilus, can be added to frozen yogurt if the pH is around or below 4.0–4.5.

== Production ==
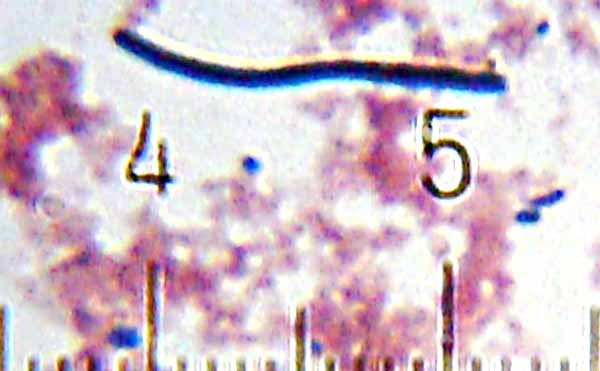
Lactobacillus bulgaricus from a sample of yogurt. Numbered ticks are 10 μm apart.

Frozen yogurt consists of milk solids, a sweetener, milk fat, yogurt culture (commonly L. bulgaricus and S. thermophilus), plus flavorings and sometimes coloring (natural or artificial). The base ingredient in frozen yogurt is pasteurized milk, which is cooled before bacterial cultures are introduced. Stabilizers and emulsifiers are added in small amounts to obtain the characteristic whipped texture.

Milk fat accounts for around 0.5–6% of the frozen yogurt. It adds richness and enhances flavor. Milk solids-not-fat (MSNF), consisting of 55% milk sugar (lactose), 37% protein (to reduce melting and add smoothness), and 8% minerals, account for 8–14% of the total volume. MSNF solids are balanced inversely with the milk fat to achieve the desired texture. According to the International Frozen Yogurt Association, the most common sweeteners used for frozen yogurt are sucrose, high-fructose corn syrup (or normal corn syrup), fructose, stevia, sucralose, and aspartame.

Production begins by heating and combining all the liquid ingredients before gradually adding the dry ingredients while stirring throughout in order to prevent clumping. The mixture is then pasteurized to eliminate harmful bacteria and homogenized to evenly distribute the ingredients. After homogenization, the mixture is inoculated with 1% yogurt culture when it reaches 32 °C (90 °F). This temperature is maintained until the mixture sets. After processing, the mixture is cooled and prepared for freezing. Flavorings, such as fruit or vanilla, can be added before the mixture is placed into a batch. As it freezes, the mixture is agitated to allow air to be mixed in, giving the frozen yogurt its light texture and creaminess. Sugar also helps to prevent the formation of ice crystals when freezing.

== Retailing ==
Self-serve frozen yogurt machines from Peachwave. The center handle dispenses a swirl of the two neighboring flavors.

Toppings at a frozen yogurt store

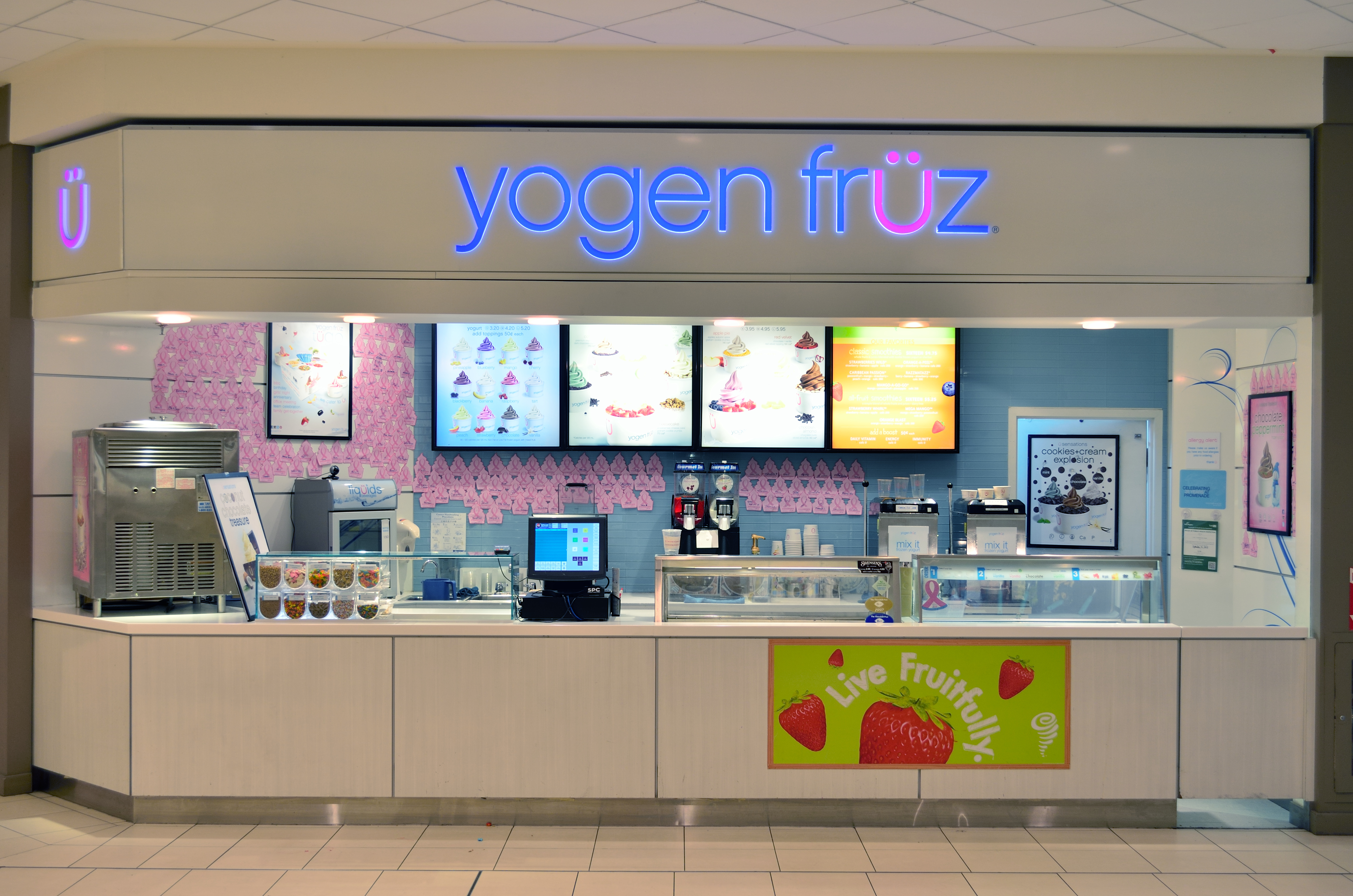
The original Yogen Früz shop located in Thornhill, Ontario, Canada

Many frozen yogurt businesses are self-serve establishments, allowing customers to add their own flavors and toppings, which are then sold by weight. Popular toppings include fruits, candies, chocolates, sauces, and nuts.

=== Frozen yogurt chains ===
Notable frozen yogurt chains include:

Chain	Country of origin	Number of locations	Founded	Ref
16 Handles	United States	32	2008	
Chocolate Shoppe Ice Cream Company	United States		1962	
Frosty Boy	Australia		1976	
Llaollao	Spain	361 (2025)	2009	
Menchie's Frozen Yogurt	United States	600	2007	
Pinkberry	United States	201 (2025)	2005	
Red Mango	United States	60+	2002	
Snog	United Kingdom	10+ in London	2008	
SweetFrog	United States	300+	2009	
TCBY	United States	129 (2025)	1981	
Yo-Chi	Australia	80 (2026)	2012	
Yoajung	South Korea	684 (2025)	2021	
Yogen Früz	Canada	424 (2025)	1986	
Yogoberry	Brazil	24 (2021)	2007	
Yogurtland	United States	207 (2025)	2006	

== Around the world ==
=== Australia ===
In Australia, frozen yogurt was introduced in 1976 by Australian ice cream brand Frosty Boy, after an Australian company bought the technology and the licensing rights to the brand. The company started producing powdered bases for soft serve products, and redistributing the machines used to make it.

Its popularity increased in the 2010s, when self-service stores and frozen yogurt chains expanded more into Australia. By 2013, at least eight frozen yogurt stores had opened in Perth within the span of three years. Frosty Boy went into the Indian market in 2014 and expanded using sponsorships and local retailers. It received another revival in 2020 when Yo-Chi opened four more stores in Australia, and when frozen yogurt shops started becoming a social space amongst Gen Z. In August 2025, Yo-Chi opened its first international store in Singapore, using Australian milk in its products.

=== Japan ===
In Japan, frozen yogurt started appearing in 1979 and was sold in the form of a cultured milk drink. It included lactic acid bacteria that were frozen after its fermentation process. It first struggled to attract customers because customer response was uncertain and there was reluctance among ice cream stores. It came back in 1987 when dessert shops and ice cream parlors started offering it. By 1989, frozen yogurt shops had opened in Tokyo and into other major Japanese cities. In 2001, Japanese dairy company Megmilk Snow Brand began introducing two variants of frozen yogurt, a plain version and one with oligosaccharides. They were advertised as being alternatives to regular frozen desserts, with live bifidobacteria included as well.

In the mid-to-late 2000s many frozen yogurt shops were opened in Japan as a result of adopting the American trend for frozen yogurt from the same period. The American chain Yogurtland opened its first location in Chatan, Okinawa in 2009, before a mainland location in Osaka in 2010. It was the first self-serve frozen yogurt shop in Japan, and it was later rebranded to Partyland. Other chains that entered Japan in the 2010s were Menchie's (2012), Red Mango (2014), Pinkberry (2015), and Yogorino (2016), an Italian chain that was said to be the best-performing in terms of expansion. Non-foreign chains include Lemson’s, Sweet Grams and North Haven. Frozen yogurt is also produced by the Yasuda-based company Yasuda Yogurt. Most Japanese frozen yogurt shops are in Tokyo; there are far fewer of them in Osaka, Nagoya and Kyoto. Frozen yogurt is much less popular in Japan than in the US and Singapore, which may be due to anti-Korean sentiment (many frozen yogurt chains have Korean origins) and the taste of Japanese people, who usually do not like the tangy flavor of plain yogurt. This is also why Japanese froyo vendors offer many toppings (e.g. Ramune jelly, sakura mochi, and matcha cookies), as well as flavored versions of yogurt (black sesame, hojicha, yuzu, sakura, sweet potato, etc.).

=== Mexico ===
In Mexico, frozen yogurt was first introduced commercially by food company Nutrisa in 1983, making it the first brand to offer and sell it in the country. The frozen yogurt market expanded in 2007. In 2008, frozen yogurt brand Moyo opened its first location in Mexico City, before expanding to 10 nationwide in 2010. During this time, frozen yogurt shops also began increasingly offering self-service products with different toppings. In Guadalajara, around 200 shops opened before 2011.

Between 2009 and 2014, the frozen yogurt market in Mexico increased by 35.4%, reaching a value of approximately $22.7 million in 2014. Nutrisa was accounted to be 66% of all frozen yogurt sales in that year. Between 2010 and 2015, the sales of packaged frozen yogurt also increased by 8.9% through supermarkets.

=== South Africa ===
In South Africa, frozen yogurt was introduced into the country by Marcel's, which opened its first store in Stellenbosch in 1989. By 2005, the company added BB-12 cultures to the frozen yogurt, and the fat content was lowered to 2.4%.

During the 2010s, frozen yogurt bars became popular in the country, especially through the expansion of self-service chains. A notable chain was Wakaberry, which opened its first store in Durban. By April 2013, the company had thirteen franchises, with another eleven planned. By 2014, Wakaberry had 33 franchises, but its expansion slowed in 2017 to 25 franchises, with it being partially attributed to a shrinkage within the frozen yogurt market. By 2020, only six stores existed, and in September 2024, Wakaberry closed its final store in Sandton.

=== South Korea ===
In South Korea, the frozen yogurt market began growing in March 2003, when frozen yogurt brand Red Mango opened its first store near Ewha Womans University in Seoul. It expanded into 172 stores two years after its first store.

By August 2005, more than 20 frozen yogurt brands had entered into the market. Some bakery and cafe chains, including Paris Baguette, Tous les Jours and A Twosome Place, also began selling frozen yogurt. However, the competition and the lack of variety contributed to the decrease in the market. Red Mango closed 37 stores in 2006 and 59 more in 2007, which left 84 stores still open. Its revenue also decreased 22% from ₩12 billion to ₩9.8 billion. During this period, the frozen yogurt market began expanding outside of South Korea. Red Mango opened its first store in the United States in July 2007 and had expanded into 14 stores in six months. Korean-style frozen yogurt also was influencing some American frozen dessert companies, including Pinkberry.

Frozen yogurt got popular again during the 2020s, and in 2024, it became popular amongst younger consumers who decorated it with fruits and honeycomb. The frozen yogurt franchise Yoajung, which was established in 2021, expanded from 166 locations in 2023 to 298 in 2024.

=== United Kingdom ===
In the United Kingdom, frozen yogurt became popular during the late 2000s, especially in London. However, it was already available in the 1990s because it was sold as a lower-fat alternative to ice cream. By 2009, frozen yogurt was being described as a food trend within the United Kingdom, following the popularity it had in the United States.

In 2012, the frozen yogurt market in the United Kingdom was worth around £4 million, compared to US$200 million in the United States. This growth was partially attributed to consumer interest in healthier foods and a variety of different toppings.

== See also ==
- List of dairy products
- List of yogurt-based dishes and beverages
