= List of frozen dessert brands =

This is a list of frozen dessert brands. Frozen dessert is the generic name for desserts made by freezing liquids, semi-solids, and sometimes even solids. They may be based on flavored water (shave ice, sorbet, snow cones, etc.), fruit purées (such as sorbet), milk and cream (most ice creams), custard (frozen custard and some ice creams), mousse (semifreddo), and others.

== Frozen dessert brands ==
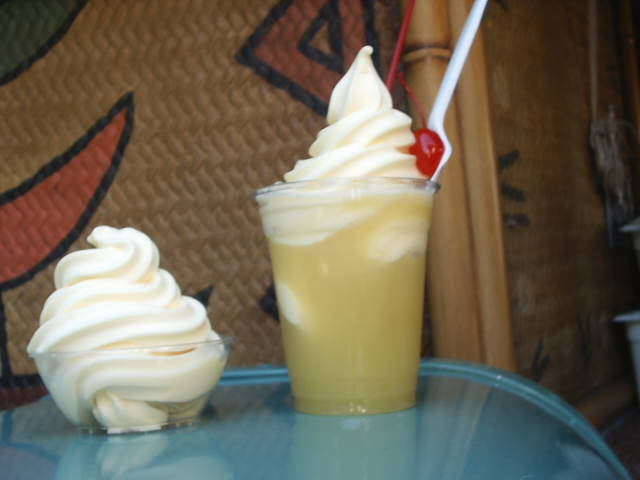
A Dole Whip

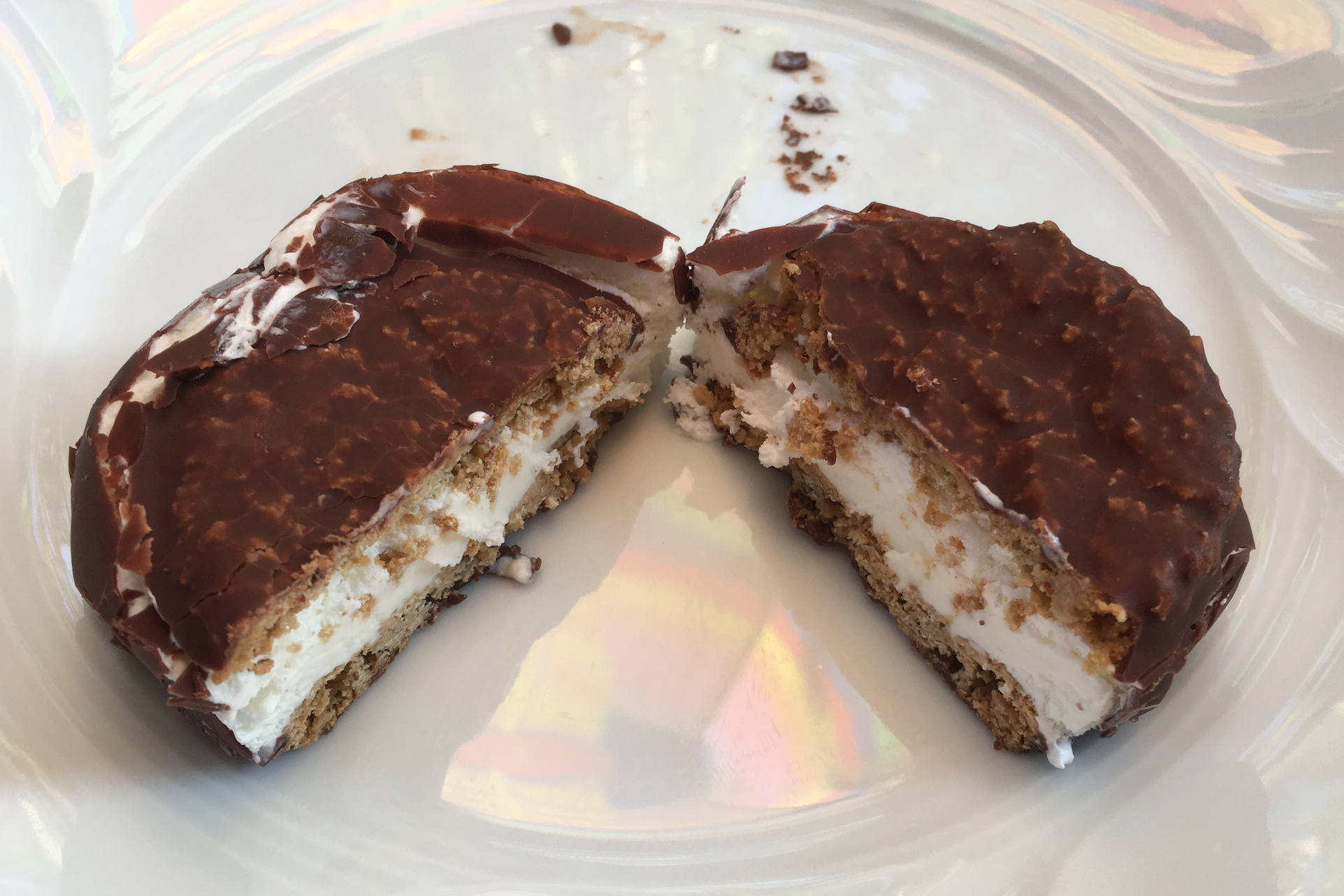
A vanilla It's-It ice cream sandwich

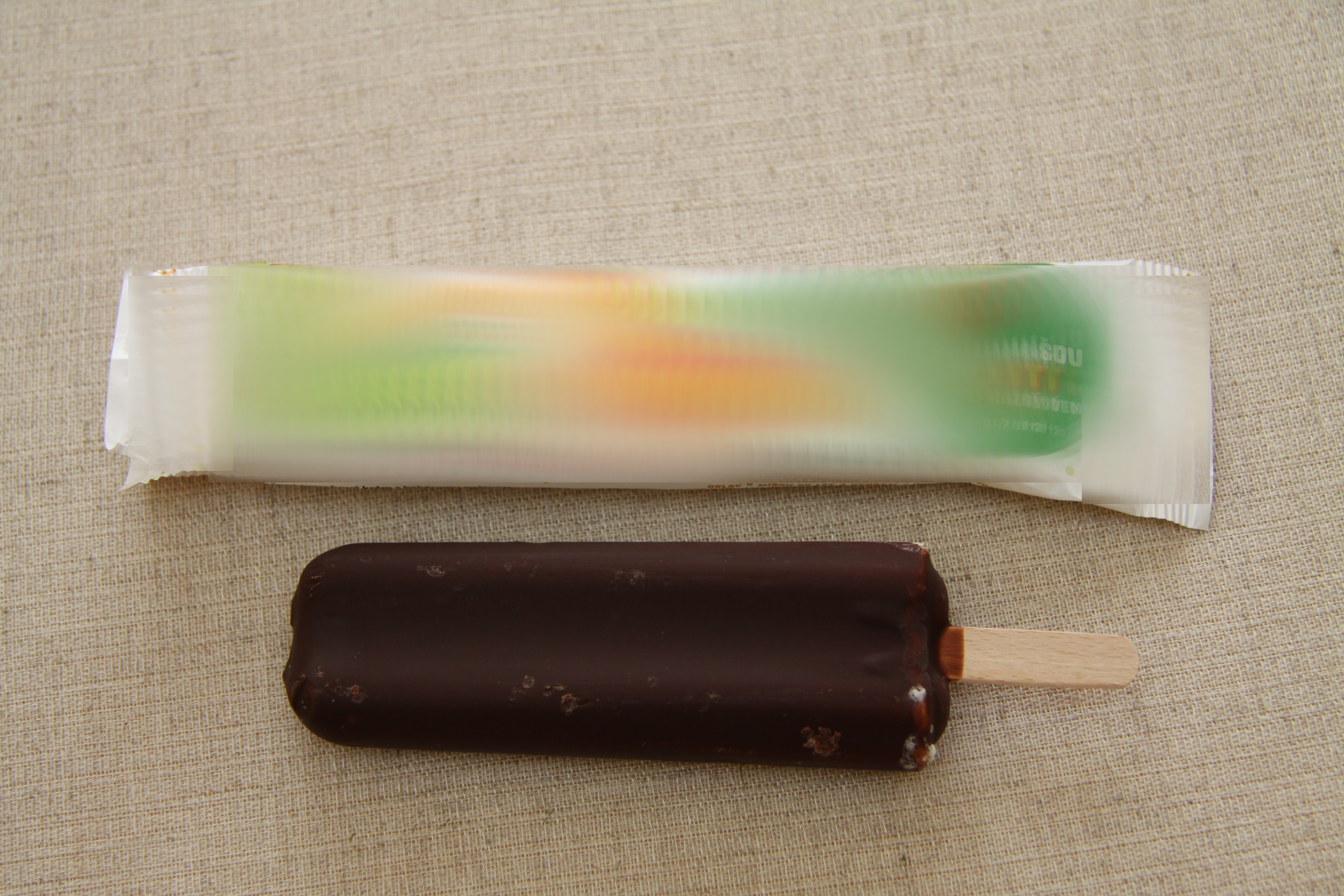
A Míša bar

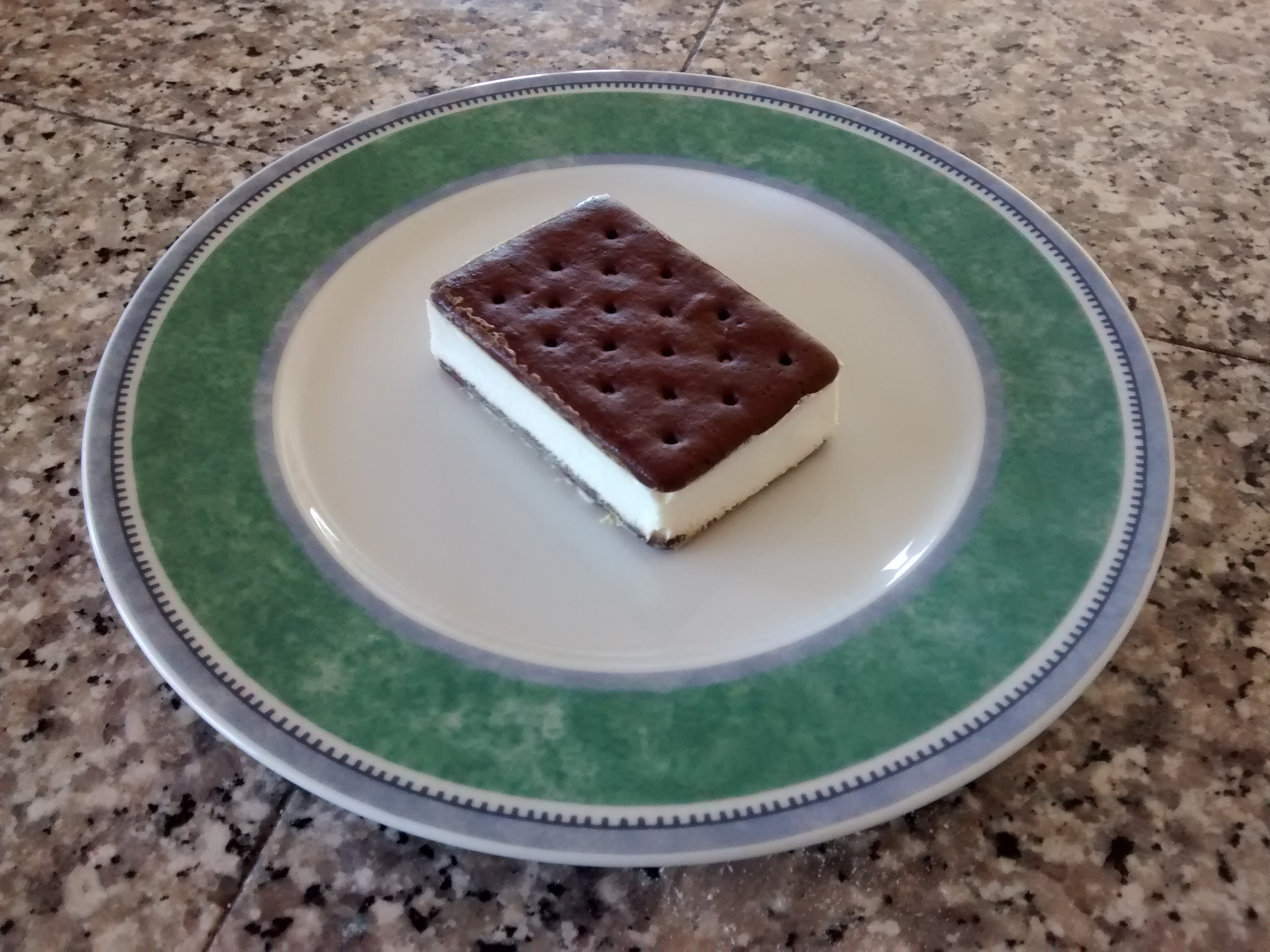
A "Tofutti Cuties" ice cream sandwich, part of the Tofutti brand

- 16 Handles
- 24 Flavors of Soft Serve
- Baskin-Robbins
- Ben & Jerry's
- Bon Ice
- Blue Bell Creameries
- Breyers
- Calippo
- Cold Stone Creamery
- Coolhaus
- Dairy Queen
- Del's
- Dippin' Dots
- Dole Whip
- Elsie Stix
- Fab
- Fla-Vor-Ice
- Freaky Ice
- Froster
- Golden Spoon
- Golly Bar
- Häagen-Dazs
- Haunted House Ice Cream
- The Icee Company
- It's-It Ice Cream
- Keventers Milkshake
- Kwality Wall's
- Little Jimmy's Italian Ices
- Lyons Maid
- Marble Slab Creamery
- Melona
- Menchie's Frozen Yogurt
- Míša
- Otter Pops
- Palapa Azul
- Pinkberry
- Popsicle
- Pudding Pop
- Red Mango, Inc.
- Slurpee
- Slurpee Flavor Tie-Ins
- SLUSH PUPPiE
- Snack and a half
- Sour Sally
- Talenti
- Tasti D-Lite
- TCBY
- Thirst Buster
- Tofutti
- Tutti Frutti Frozen Yogurt
- Wall's
- Yogen Früz
- Yogurtland
- Yumilicious
- Zooper Dooper

== See also ==
- List of ice cream brands
- List of brand name food products
- List of desserts
- List of food companies
- List of frozen food brands
