= Freezie =

Frozen confection inside plastic casing

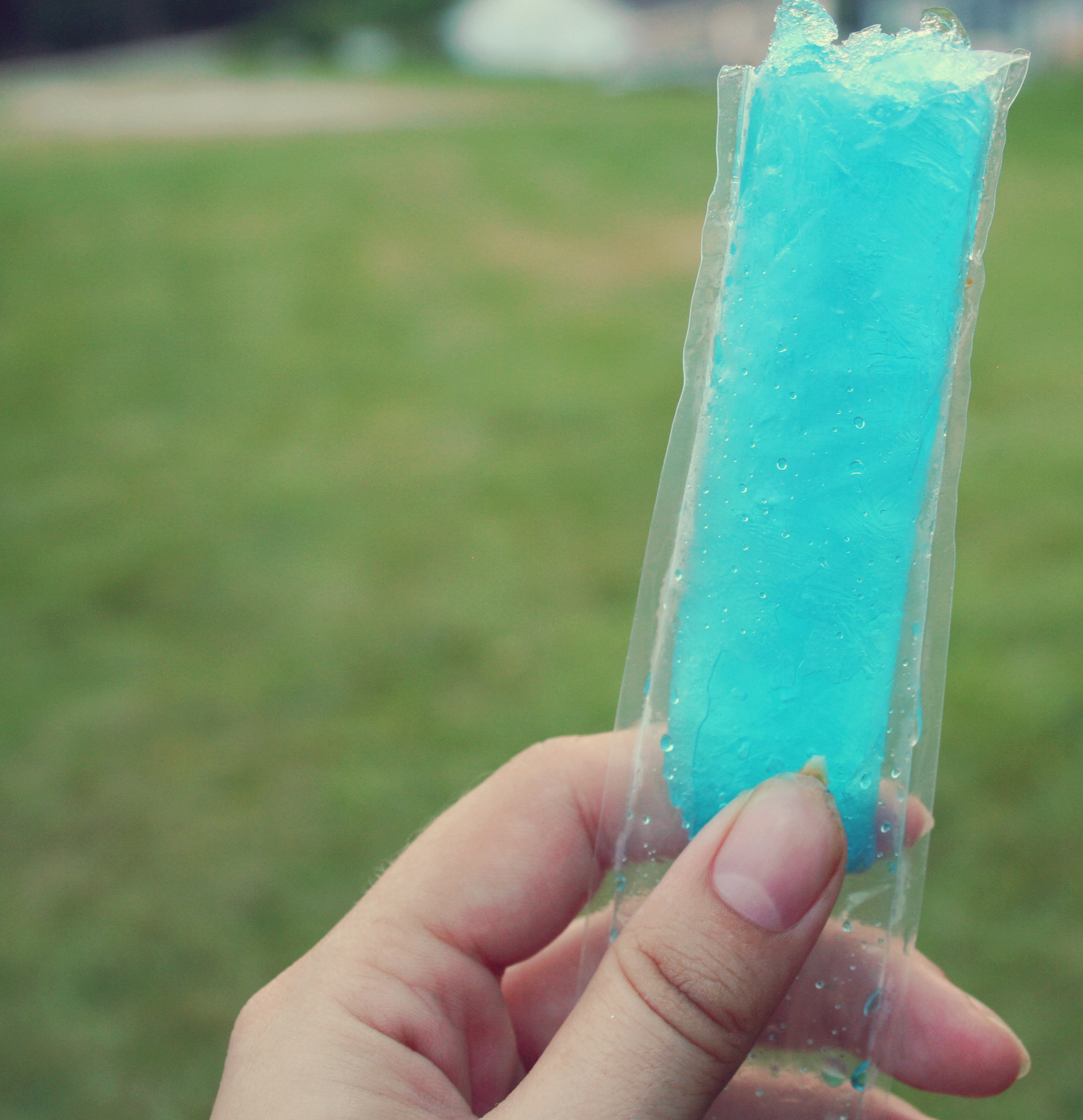
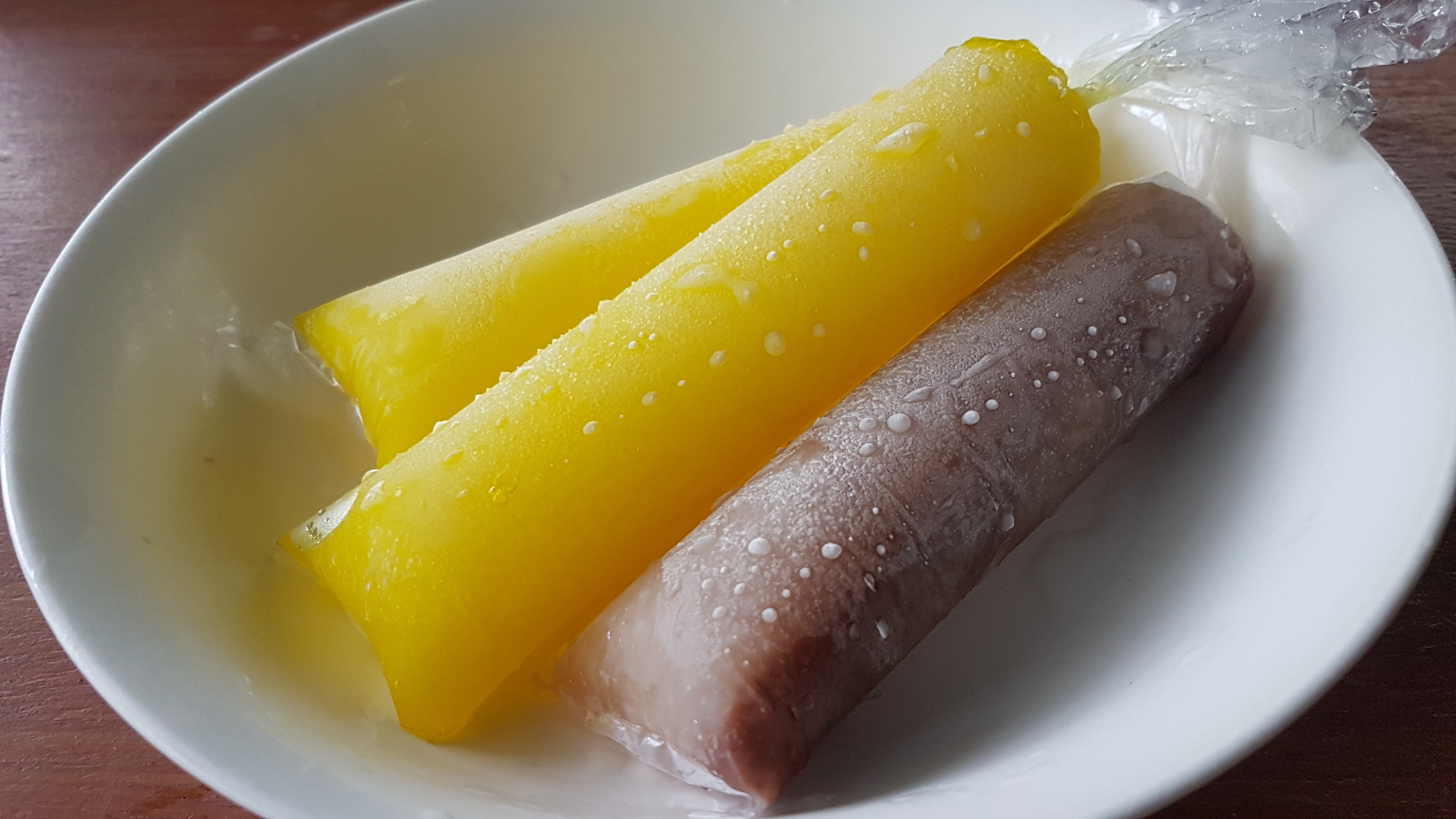
- Top: A blue raspberry flavored freeze pop from the United States; Bottom: Home-made pineapple and chocolate-flavored ice candy from the Philippines
- Alternative names: Freeze pop, freezer pop, ice pole, icy pole, sip up, ice candy, cool pop
- Type: Frozen dessert
- Place of origin: United States
- Main ingredients: Water, flavoring (such as fruit juices)

A freezie or a freeze pop is a water-based frozen confection similar to an ice pop. It is made by freezing flavored liquid such as sugar water, fruit juice or purée inside a plastic casing or tube, either round or flat. Freezies come in sealed plastic tubular wrappers and conform to the shape of the wrapper when frozen to serve; as such, they do not need to be stored cold. They also do not need to be frozen as solidly as an ice pop and can have a consistency similar to that of a slushie. Freezies are sold in a variety of flavors, including cherry, orange, lemon-lime, watermelon, cream soda, blue raspberry and grape.

== Name ==
Freezies go by a variety of distinct names in different regions. The name freezie itself is most commonly used in Canada. Other regional names include freeze pop and freezer pop in the United States, ice pole and ice pop in the United Kingdom, icy pole and ice block in Australia, sip up and Pepsi ice in India, penna-cool in Trinidad and ice candy in the Philippines.

Names used in non-English speaking countries include bolis in Mexico and Colombia, polo flash in Spain, chup or marciano in Peru; naranjú or marciano in Argentina; chup-chup, sacolé, dindim, gelinho and geladinho in Brazil, shlukim (Hebrew: שלוקים) in Israel, and aiskrim Malaysia in Malaysia.

The name of the prominent brand of freezies is also commonly used as a generic term for freezies in the region. Examples include Otter Pops, Fla-Vor-Ice, ICEE, and Pop-Ice in the United States, Zooper Dooper in Australia, and Mr. Freeze in the United Kingdom and Canada.

== History ==
The first brand to introduce the concept of freezies to the United States was Pop-Ice, which was acquired by Jel Sert in 1963. Six years later in 1969, Jel Sert launched its own brand of freezies called Fla-Vor-Ice, which quickly gained popularity and became the company's best-selling brand. Otter Pops was founded in the 1970s and grew to dominate the West Coast freezie market. In 1996, the company was acquired by Jel Sert, making Jel Sert the largest supplier of freezies in the United States.

In Canada, freezies have been made by Kisko under the Mr. Freeze brand since 1977 when the company started producing them in the Toronto region after the business was relocated from Kingston, Jamaica. In the UK and Ireland, an unrelated brand called Mr. Freeze has been sold since 1966.

== Brands ==
The freezies market is composed of many prominent regional brands with no brands having a large global reach. In the United States, prominent brands of freezies include Fla-Vor-Ice, Otter Pops, Pop-Ice, all three of which are made by Jel Sert. Other prominent brands include Mr. Freeze, produced by Kisko, in Canada, the unrelated Mr. Freeze produced by Calypso Soft Drinks Ltd in the British Isles, Zooper Dooper in Australia, Bon Ice in Mexico, Calippo in Europe and Australasia and Polaretti in Italy.

== See also ==
- Granita
- Italian ice
- Sorbet
