= Tofutti =

American food company

Tofutti Brands, Inc.
- Type: Public
- Traded as: OTCQB: TOFB
- Industry: Soy products manufacturer
- Founded: 1981
- Founder: David Mintz
- Headquarters: Cranford, New Jersey, United States
- Products: Tofutti Better Than Cream Cheese, Tofutti Better Than Sour Cream, Tofutti Better Than Ricotta Cheese, Tofutti American Cheese Slices, Tofutti Frozen Dessert, Tofutti Cuties, Tofutti Better Than Sour Cream Dips
- Revenue: ▼US$7.78 million (2025)
- Net income: ▲ −US$0.78 million (2025)
- Website: tofutti.com

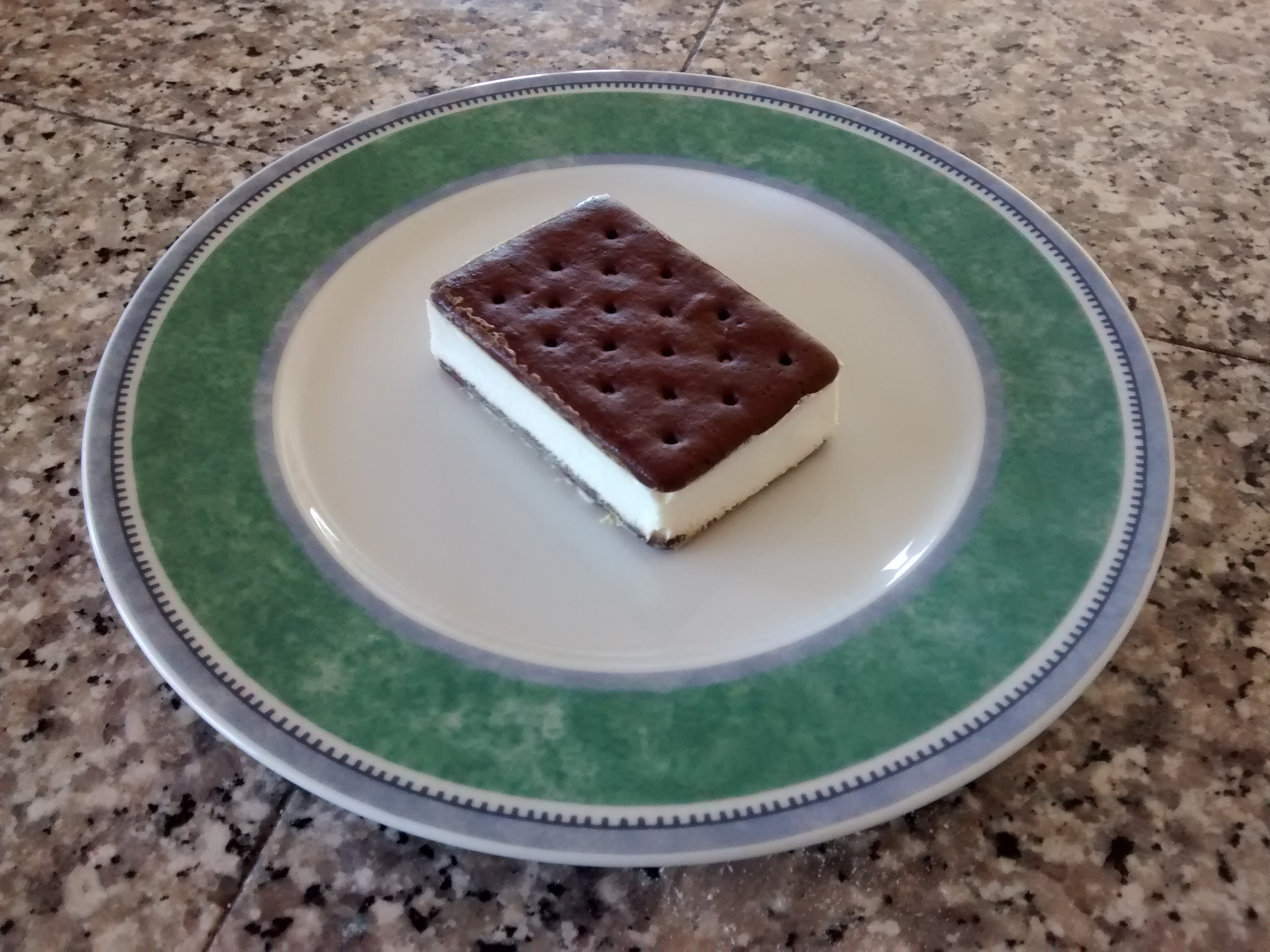
"Tofutti Cuties" ice cream sandwich

Tofutti Brands Inc. is a U.S. company based in Cranford, New Jersey, that makes a range of soy-based, dairy-free foods under the "Tofutti" brand that was founded by David Mintz. Tofutti sells an ice cream substitute for the lactose-intolerant, kosher parve, food allergy sensitive, vegetarian, and vegan markets.

== History ==
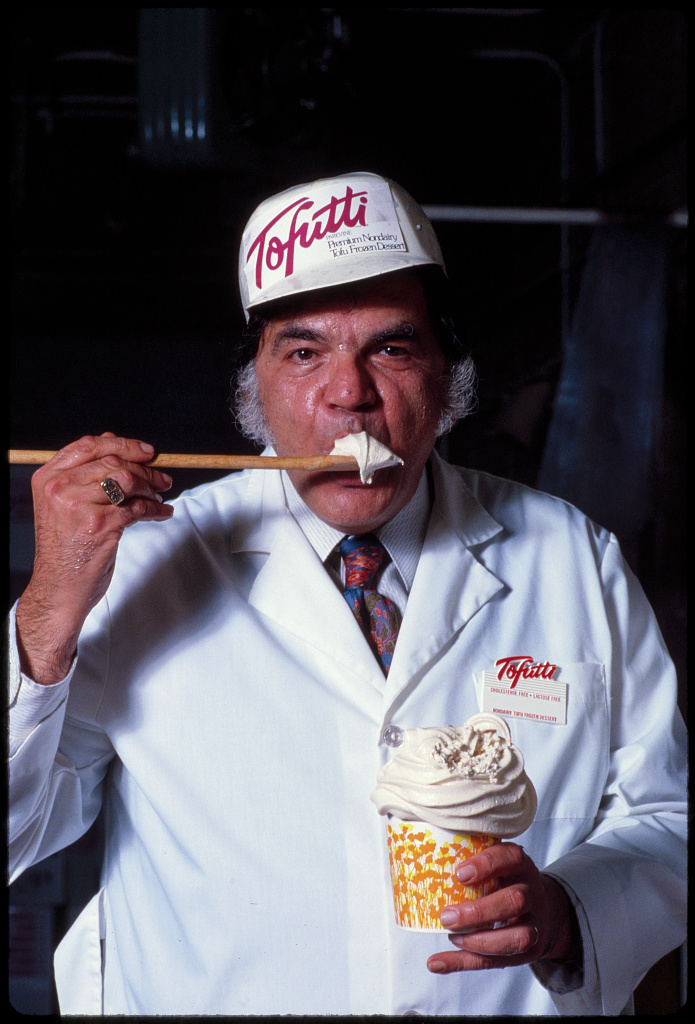
David Mintz in 1982

In the 1970s, David Mintz, who owned catering companies in New York, decided to make non-dairy ice cream out of tofu, for his Orthodox Jewish customers who did not eat dairy and meat products together. After nine years of experimenting, Tofutti was introduced in 1981. David Mintz died in 2021.

== Products ==
Tofutti produces an ice cream substitute, soy-based sour cream, cream cheese, sliced cheese, and ricotta cheese. And frozen desserts, namely "Tofutti Cuties", their version of the ice cream sandwich. All Tofutti products are plant-based and vegan.

== Stock ==
Previously listed on the New York Stock Exchange under the ticker symbol TOF, Tofutti was delisted in 2016 and now trades over the counter under the symbol TOFB on the OTCQB market.

== See also ==
- List of frozen dessert brands
