= List of Skittles products =

Skittles logo

Skittles, a brand name of candy products produced by the Wm. Wrigley Jr. Company, come in a wide variety of flavors. Most of the varieties are available only in particular regions of the world. The first flavor was Original Fruit Skittles, first released in Europe in 1974, and then in the United States in 1979. Earlier Skittles products tended to focus on fruit flavors; more recent products have branched out to include flavors such as chocolate, bubble gum, popcorn, mint, and sours.

The original Skittles flavors in the United States (and other countries except for Europe) are orange, lemon, lime, grape and strawberry. In 2013, Skittles changed its original flavor line-up to include green apple, causing a consumer backlash. Green apple also replaced lime in the sour packets. It was rumored that the reason behind this is the green apple flavor outperforming lime in taste tests. A "Long Lost Lime" variation of Skittles was released in summer 2017 and 2018, bringing the lime flavor back to the original mix of Skittles for a limited time only. In September 2021, it was announced that lime would be permanently returning to the original Skittles flavor in October 2021, replacing green apple for the first time since 2013.

Name	Colors and flavors	Notes	Year
Original Skittles (Europe)	Strawberry (red); Orange (orange); Lemon (yellow); Lime (green); Blackcurrant (purple)	Blue-colored cherry cola flavored Skittles were included in a limited edition variant in 2015.	1974
Original Skittles (International)	Grape (purple); Lemon (yellow); Lime (green); Orange (orange); Strawberry (red)	In the United States and other countries excluding Europe, green Skittles were green apple flavored from 2013 until 2021. Green apple also replaced lime in the United States for a brief time in April 2001, as part of a promotion. In 2021, it was announced that, due to public demand, this change would be permanently reversed, bringing the lime flavor back to the original mix of Skittles for the first time since 2013.	1979
Original Skittles (Australia)	Strawberry (red); Orange (orange); Lemon (yellow); Green Apple (green); Grape (purple)		1987
En Fuego (Mexico, US)	Grape (purple); Lemon (yellow); Lime (green); Orange (orange); Strawberry (red)	The flavor was sold in Mexico and in the United States for a short time in 2003.	2003
Tropical (Europe and Australia)	Orange (orange); Pineapple (yellow); Fruit Punch (blue); Passion Fruit (purple); Watermelon (pink)		2016
Tropical (International)	Banana Berry (yellow); Kiwi Lime (green); Mango Tangelo (orange); Pineapple Passion fruit (blue); Strawberry Starfruit (pink)	Tropical Skittles have two flavors in one Skittle.	1989
Wild Berry (Europe and Australia)	Strawberry & Kiwi (red); Apple & Blackberry (green); Blueberry (light blue); Raspberry (pink); Cherry (purple)		2014
Wild Berry (International)	Berry Punch (violet); Melon Berry (green); Raspberry (blue); Strawberry (pink); Wild Cherry (red)	The flavor was launched in Australia and New Zealand in 2012 and in the UK in 2014. A variant with fizzy powder existed from 2010 to 2011 (known as Fizzl'd Fruits), but some of the colors were changed.	1989
Tart-N-Tangy	The flavors were those that represent the sour Skittles that were released after these were discontinued with slight differences to the flavors. Specifics on the flavors are sketchy.	Discontinued in 1992; replaced by Sour Skittles.	1989
Crazy Cores	(shell color, core): Blue Raspberry Lemon (blue, yellow); Cherry Lemonade (red, yellow); Mango-Peach (orange, red); MelonBerry (green, pink); Strawberry-Watermelon (pink, green)	The flavor was sold in bulk stores in the United States (e.g., Sam's Club) for a short time in 2008. Introduced in the United Kingdom in 2011, and replaced by Confused Skittles in 2013.	2008/2011 (UK)
Confused (2008)	The flavors were meant to be Fruit Skittles with the colors and flavors mixed up, showing the answers on the back.	Skittles with mixed up flavors and colors. Sold for a short time in the United Kingdom in 2008. The flavor came in purple bags with a large question mark.	2008
Xtreme	2 flavors in 1 Skittle: Green Apple-Watermelon (green, red); Red Apple (Watermelon-Green Apple) (red, green); Grape-Lemon (purple, yellow); Lemon-Watermelon (yellow, red); Lime (Lemon-Green Apple) (yellow, green)	The flavor was sold for a limited time in 2009.	2009
Confused (2013)	Similar to an incarnation previously sold in the United Kingdom where the same colored shell contains different flavors (e.g., the green Skittle may be cherry in one bag, and peach in another).: Blue Raspberry; Cherry; Lemon; Mango + Peach; Lime; Watermelon; Mandarin; Blueberry; Raspberry; Melon Berry	The flavor was part of the 2013 Skittles brand re-launch in the United Kingdom. Carried the tagline 'Confuse the Rainbow, Taste the Rainbow'	
Sour (Europe and Australia)	Sour Blackcurrant (purple); Sour Lime (green); Sour Lemon (yellow); Sour Strawberry (red); Sour Orange (orange)		2001
Sour (International)	Sour Grape (purple); Sour Lime (green); Sour Lemon (yellow); Sour Strawberry (red); Sour Orange (orange)	Sour Green Apple replaced Sour Lime from 2013 until 2021.	2001
Crazy Sours	Sour Apple (green); Sour Cherry Berry (purple); Sour Mandarin (orange); Sour Pineapple (yellow); Sour Raspberry (pink)	The flavor is available in Europe.	2003
Smoothie Mix	Lemon Berry (light yellow); Mixed Berry (pastel purple); Orange, Mango (faded orange); Peach Pear (light green); Strawberry Banana (light peach)	Skttles with flavors reminiscent of a smoothie. The flavor was sold for a short time in 2009. The product was sold in orange packaging.	2009
Ice Cream	Caramel Ripple (light brown); Chocolate (dark brown); Orange (orange); Strawberry (pink); Vanilla (beige); Vanilla Swirl (orange)	Sold in convenience stores in urban cities for a limited time in 2010.	2010
Carnival	Bubble Gum (pink); Candy Apple (light yellow); Cotton Candy (baby blue); Liquorice (red); Green Slushy (green)	The flavor was sold in the United States for a limited time in 2007.	2007
Unlimited	Bubblegum (baby blue); Jam Doughnut (brown red); Popcorn (light yellow); Toffee Apple (green)	The flavor was sold in Canada for a limited time in 2011. The product was sold in blue packaging.	2011
Bubble Gum	Grape (purple); Lemon (yellow); Lime (green); Orange (orange); Strawberry (red)	The flavor was introduced in 2003 and discontinued in 2006.	2003
Extreme Fruit Bubble Gum	Blue Raspberry (blue); Wild Cherry (red); Green Apple (green); Tangerine (orange); Watermelon (pink)	The flavor was sold in black boxes for a short time in 2006 before being discontinued along with original-flavored Skittles bubble gum.	2006
Mint (United States)	Spearmint; Wintergreen	Mint Skittles in the United States came in two flavors, spearmint and wintergreen, with five different colors for each (blue and green, respectively). Unlike original Skittles, the flavors were packaged in plastic containers instead of bags. The flavor was sold for a limited time in 2002.	2002
Fresh Mint	White; Green; Aqua; Turquoise; Light Green	The flavor was sold for a limited time in the United States in 2006.	2006
Mint (Europe)	Cool Mint (blue); Peppermint (white); Toffee Mint (green-brown); Spearmint (dark green); Sweet Mint (pale green)	The flavor, different from Mint Skittles sold in the United States, was sold for a limited time in Europe. The flavor was sold in a 55-gram (1.94-oz) deep turquoise-colored box instead of the usual bags.	—N/a
Chocolate Mix	Chocolate Caramel (brown); Brownie Batter (dark brown/black); Chocolate Pudding (auburn); S'mores (copper); Vanilla (off-white/buff)	The flavor was sold in brown packaging in the United States for a limited time in 2008.	2007
Chocolate	Hot Chocolate (white, later red); Milk Chocolate (brown); Mocha Chocolate (green); Nutty Chocolate (tan); Wild Chocolate (blue)	The flavor was a retooling of the Chocolate Mix flavor, and was sold in the United States for a limited time in 2008.	2008
Liquorice	Black Liquorice (black); Liquorice Aniseed (green); Liquorice Mint (white); Liquorice Spice (red); Liquorice Vanilla (orange)	The flavor was sold in Europe in 55-gram (1.94-oz) boxes instead of the usual bags.	—N/a
Citrus	Mandarin Orange (light orange); Pink Grapefruit (pink); Lemon (yellow); Lime (green); Orange (dark orange)	The flavor was sold in Australia.	—N/a
Skittles Sensations	Chili Berry (red); Cool Raspberry (blue); Juicy Orange (orange); Lemon Tingle (yellow); Sour Apple (green)	Skittles with 'hot' and 'cool' flavors.	2009
Skittles Fizzl'd Fruits	Berry Punch (violet); Melon Berry (green); Raspberry (blue); Strawberry (pink); Wild Cherry (red)	Introduced in 2010, these were Wild Berry Skittles with fizzing powder coating. The flavor was discontinued in 2012 due to low sales.	2010
Skittles Blenders	Strawberry Lime Blast (pink); Cherry Tropicolada (red); Green Apple Watermelon Freeze (green); Mango Lemonade Blast (peach); Melon Berry Blast (blue)	These were Skittles with two flavors blended together. The flavor was discontinued in 2014.	2011
Skittles Riddles	Watermelon; Cherry; Punch; Apple; Raspberry	These were Skittles with colors that don't match the flavors. They were similar to the 2008 Confused Skittles from the UK, where the same colored shell can contain different flavors (e.g., a green Skittle may be apple in one bag, and cherry in another). The colors were red, pink, green, teal, and blue. The flavor was discontinued in the United States in 2014.	2012
Skittles Darkside (UK)	Wicked Pomegranate (red); Sweet Strawberry (purple); Midnight Lime (green); Dark Berry (blue); Blood Orange (orange)	These are Skittles with a slight bold fruit taste. The flavor was first launched in the United Kingdom in 2015 as a limited edition flavour. Returns seasonally in the United Kingdom for Halloween.	2015
Skittles Darkside (United States)	Black Cherry (red); Forbidden Fruit (blue); Midnight Lime (green); Dark Berry (purple); Blood Orange (orange)	These are Skittles with a slight bold fruit taste. The flavor was first discontinued in 2015, but it was revived in the United States in 2019. The flavor was re-discontinued in 2022.	2013
Skittles Desserts	Raspberry Sorbet (red); Blueberry Tart (blue); Key Lime Pie (green); Orange Creme (orange); Strawberry Milkshake (pink)	These are Skittles with dessert flavors The flavor was introduced in the United States in late November 2013 and in Canada in 2014, and discontinued in 2016.	2013
Seattle Mix Skittles	Raspberry (blue); Melon Berry (green)	This was a limited edition flavor of Skittles that had only raspberry and melon berry flavored, both inherited from the Wild Berry flavor. The flavor was originally released along with Skittles Football Auction items in January 2014. The flavor was re-released as a Super Bowl XLIX edition in January 2015.	2014
Skittles Orchards	Red Apple (light red); Cherry (dark red); Lime (green); Peach (peach); Orange (orange)	These Skittles had fruit flavors that would be found in an orchard. The flavor was discontinued in 2017.	2014
Flavor Mash-Ups!	Banana Berry (yellow); Kiwi Lime (green); Mango Tangelo (orange); Pineapple Passion fruit (blue); Strawberry Starfruit (pink); Berry Punch (violet); Melon Berry (green); Raspberry (blue); Strawberry (pink); Wild Cherry (red)	Contains a mix of Tropical and Wild Berry Skittles.	2015
Skittles Sweets & Sours	Sweet Strawberry (pink); Sweet Orange (orange); Sour Cherry (red); Sweet Watermelon (green); Sour Blue Raspberry (blue)	These were Skittles with sweet and sour flavors. The flavor was discontinued in 2019.	2016
Skittles America Mix	Wild Berry (light blue); Blackberry (dark blue); Strawberry (red); Raspberry (dark red); Yumberry (white)	These are Skittles with colors of the American flag. Sold around 4th of July every year from 2017 to 2023.	2017
Skittles Cauldron	Petrified Pear (light green); Gripping Grape (purple); Twisted Tangerine (orange); Bogey Berry (blue); Lurking Lemon (yellow)	These are Skittles with Halloween-themed flavors. Sold every year around Halloween since 2016.	2016
Skittles Brightside	Paradise Punch (blue); Kiwi Banana (yellow); Tangerine (orange); Watermelon (green); Pink Lemonade (pink)	These are Skittles with vivid bright colors. This flavor was found in some Walmart stores in October 2016, and released nationwide in 2017. The flavor was discontinued in 2022.	2017
Skittles Fruits & Sours	Strawberry (red); Lime (green); Blackcurrant (purple); Sour Mandarin (orange); Sour Pineapple (yellow); Sour Raspberry (pink)	The flavor is a mixture of 3 flavors from the Fruits and Crazy Sours flavors, sold for a limited time in the United Kingdom in 2017.	Early-Mid 2017
Pride Fruits	Strawberry; Orange; Blackcurrant; Lemon; Lime	Fruit Skittles all in white to celebrate Pride Month once a year in the United Kingdom.	2017
Trick Plays	Comeback Cherry; Audible Apple; Raspberry Rush; Strawberry Sneak; For-the-Win Watermelon	Limited edition US release in partnership with the National Football League. Colors don't match the flavors (colors are pink, light green, teal, blue, and red).	Fall 2017
Sweet Heat (United States)	Fiery Watermelon (pink); Blazin' Mango (light orange); Flamin' Orange (orange); Sizzlin' Strawberry (light pink); Lemon Spark (yellow)	These were Skittles with a spicy kick. The flavor was discontinued in 2018.	2017
Holiday Mix	Grape (green); Green Apple (light green); Strawberry (dark red); Wild Cherry (red); Lemon (light green)	These were Skittles with Christmas colors (red and green). The flavor was sold around the Christmas season in 2015, 2016, and 2017.	2015
Love Mix	Watermelon (light red); White grape (white); Strawberry (red); Cherry (dark red); Yumberry (white)	These were Skittles with white, pink, and red colors. The flavor was sold between January and February 2018, and was exclusive to Target.	2018
Summer Splash	Strawberry (pink); Orange (orange); Kiwi Banana (yellow); Watermelon (green); Blue Raspberry (teal)	These were Skittles with summer-oriented flavors. The flavor was sold between June and July 2018, and was exclusive to Dollar General.	2018
Orchards Limited Edition (United Kingdom)	Cherry (purple); Pomegranate (dark red); Lemon (yellow); Apple (green); Orange (orange)	The flavor was sold in the United Kingdom for a short time in 2018. The colors and flavors are different from the United States version.	2018
Sweet Heat Limited Edition (United Kingdom)	Piccante Passion Fruit (purple); Sizzlin' Strawberry (red); Lemon Spark (yellow); Fiery Watermelon (pink); Scorchin' Pineapple (orange)	The flavor was sold in the United Kingdom for a short time in September and October 2018 as a Halloween special. The colors and flavors are different from the United States version. Sizzlin' Strawberry is colored red instead of light pink, and Flamin Orange' and Blazin' Mango are replaced by Scorchin' Pineapple and Piccante Passion Fruit; the latter is colored purple instead of light orange.	2018
Zombie	Petrifying Citrus Punch (orange); Mummified Melon (green); Boogeyman Blackberry (blue); Chilling Black Cherry (purple); Blood Red Berry (red); Rotten Zombie (random color)	These are Halloween-themed Skittles with some with a Rotten Zombie flavor mixed in, similar to Bean Boozled jelly beans. The flavor was sold during Halloween 2019.	2019
Imposters	Alter Ego Orange; Cryptic Citrus; Sneaky Strawberry; Undercover Apple; Raspberry Ruse	The flavor was sold between June and July 2019, and was exclusive to Walmart. The colors don't match the flavors (colors are pink, green, blue, orange, and white).	2019
Freeze Pop	Blue Raspberry (teal); Lemon (yellow); Grape (white); Orange (orange); Strawberry (pink)	The flavor was sold between June and July 2019, and was exclusive to Dollar General.	2019
Sour Wild Berry	Sour Strawberry; Sour Berry Punch; Sour Wild Cherry; Sour Melon Berry; Sour Raspberry	These are Wild Berry Skittles with sour coating. The flavor was sold between June and July 2019, and was exclusive to Dollar General.	2019
Smoothies (Europe)	Pineapple (yellow); Banana (pale yellow); Apricot (pale orange); Raspberry (pale pink); Blueberry (pale blue)	The flavor was released in 2021. The flavours contain a sweet vanilla note, more reminiscent of ice cream flavours.	2021
Chewies	Orange; Lemon; Blackcurrant; Strawberry; Lime	Skittles Fruits without the shells, available in Europe.	2018
Giants	Strawberry; Orange; Blackcurrant; Lemon; Lime	These are Skittles that are 3 times bigger than normal. Comes in Fruits and Crazy Sours flavors, and sold in Europe.	
Shriekers	Rattled Raspberry (purple); Ghoulish Green Apple (green); Shocking Lime (pale green); Spine-tingling Tangerine (orange); Citrus Scream (pale orange)	These are Skittles with a chance that the flavors might be very sour. Sold every year around Halloween since 2021.	2021
Desserts (Europe and Australia)	Cherry Chesscake (pink); Choco-Orange-Cake (orange); Blueberry Tape (purple); Lemon Pie (yellow); Strawberry Ice Cream (red)	These are Skittles with a chance that the flavors might be very Desserts. The flavor was sold in 2023.	2023
Citrus (Europe)	Orange; Lemon; Lime; Mandarin; Blood Orange		2025
Skittles Smoothies (United States)	Raspberry Smoothie (red); Blueberry Smoothie (purple); Mango Smoothie (orange); Peach Guava Smoothie (yellow); Strawberry Banana Smoothie (pink)	The flavor is an updated version of the Smoothie Mix Skittles.	2020
Slushie (Australia)	Summer Strawberry (red); Blue Raspberry (blue); Lemon Lime (lime green); Ice Cola (black); Pineapple Bliss (yellow)	The flavor is an updated version of the Slushie Mix Skittles.	20??
Gummies (United States)	Strawberry (red); Orange (orange); Lemon (yellow); Green Apple (green); Grape (purple)		2021
Squishy Cloudz	Strawberry (red); Orange (orange); Lemon (yellow); Green Apple (green); Grape (purple)	Sold in Europe.	2022
Squishy Cloudz Crazy Sours	Sour Apple (green); Sour Cherry Berry (purple); Sour Mandarin (orange); Sour Pineapple (yellow); Sour Raspberry (pink)	Sold in Europe.	2022
Sour Gummies (United States)	Sour Strawberry (red); Sour Orange (orange); Sour Lemon (yellow); Sour Green Apple (green); Sour Grape (purple)		2023
Skittles POP'd	Strawberry (red); Orange (orange); Lemon (yellow); Lime (green); Grape (purple)	These are freeze dried versions of Skittles. The process of freeze drying makes them crunchy and exposes the white on the inside.	2024
Sour Skittles POP'd	Sour Cherry (red); Sour Strawberry (pink); Sour Blue Raspberry (blue); Sour Watermelon (green); Sour Lemonade (yellow)	A sour variation of Skittles POP'd with different flavors.	2024
Gummies Fuego	Strawberry (red); Mango (orange); Lemon (yellow); Watermelon (green); Raspberry (blue)	A variation of Skittles Gummies covered in chili powder.	2025
POP'd Creepy Crunch	Ghastly Lime; Blood Orange; Beastly Blackberry; Red Raspberry	POP'd Halloween release, featuring different flavors.	2026
