= Lyons Maid =

Brand of ice cream

- Owner: Froneri

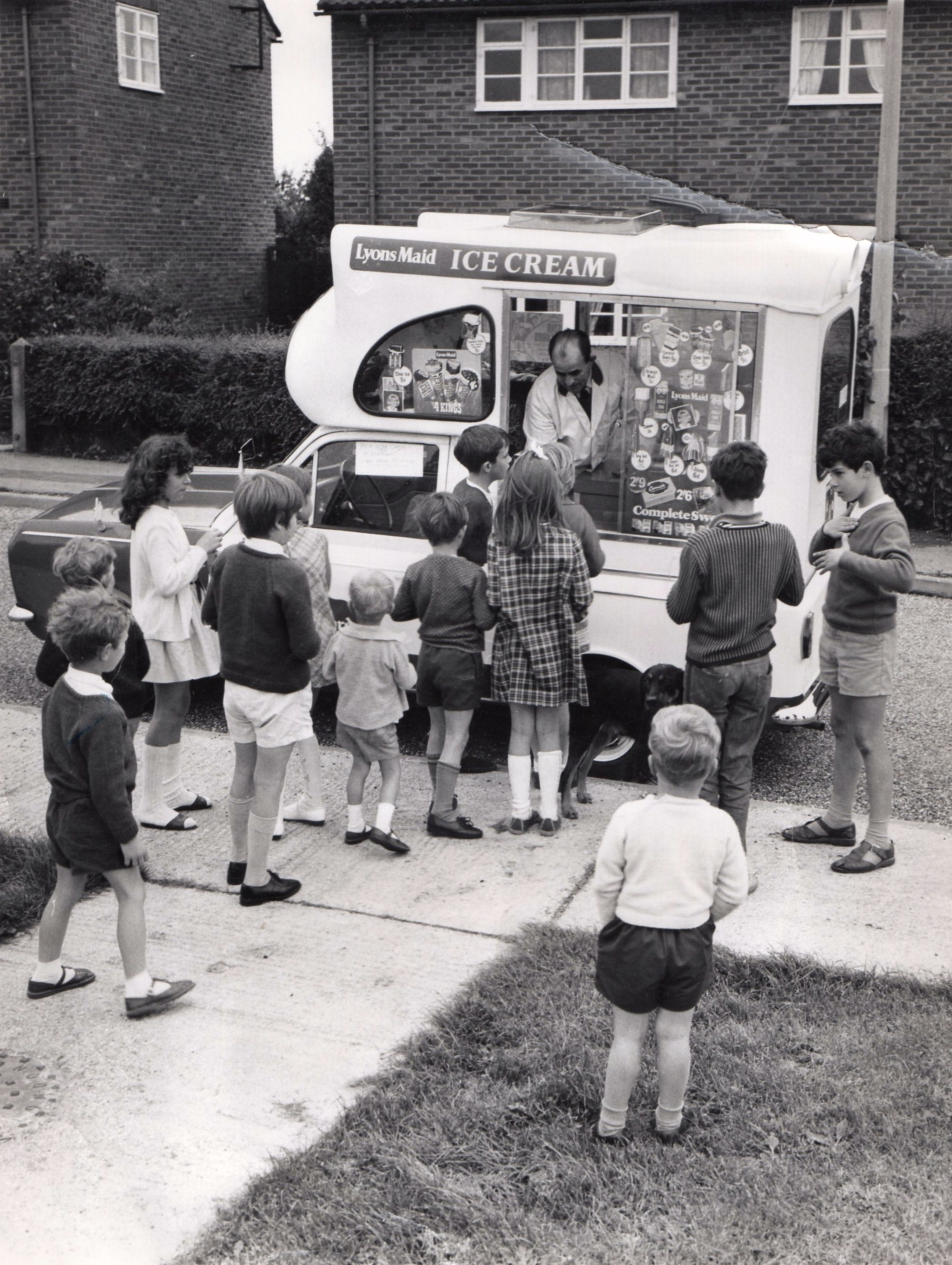
Lyons Maid ice-cream van (Cambridge 1960s)

Lyons Maid is a British brand of ice-creams and ice-lollies created in 1925 as a spin-off from the J. Lyons and Co. retail organisation. It is now owned by the Froneri joint venture.

Well-known brands produced by Lyons Maid included: Zoom (no longer in production), Strawberry Mivvi, Orange Maid, Lolly Gobble Choc Bomb, Fab and Haunted House.

== History ==
Lyon's Maid's most commercially successful period was probably the 1970s, when a vast range of ice-lollies were sold. This range often had tie-ins to well-known characters from TV and film and included free gifts. Many of the lollies had inventive wrapper designs; promotional cartoon strips were also launched to support sales.

Examples of the lollies include a tie-in with Space: 1999 with free cards of episodes inside the wrapper, Star Wars with free masks of major characters and film facts on the wrappers, The Six Million Dollar Man TV series, Superman and even a Goal lolly with lolly sticks containing famous footballers of the day.

The Lyons Maid brand logo, sometimes known as the 'Good Time Sign' but more generally referred to in-house as the 'Dancing Children', was initially developed by advertising agency Young & Rubicam to identify the brand in sweet shops and later on packaging and on ice cream vans, but was eventually phased in across the whole product range where it continued to be used on branding and shop signage until Lyons Maid was sold to Nestlé in 1992. At that time, Nestlé combined its standard international blue-and-white ice cream logo with the Lyons Maid logotype and the three dancing children from the Good Time Sign until 1998, when the Lyons Maid brand was dropped in favour of a standardised Nestlé ice cream logo.

Lyons Maid's chief rival was Wall's ice cream now owned by Unilever.

In 2008, Lyons Maid was revived when R&R Ice Cream decided to restore the brand. Charlotte Hambling, senior marketing manager of R&R, stated at the time: "By bringing back the Lyons Maid brand to family dinner tables across the country, we will be tapping into the great nostalgia the brand enjoys, as well as the strong consumer heritage and high levels of consumer awareness and trust within the brand. With our new Lyons Maid products, we are taking advantage of these factors and introducing a range of family favourites, as well as re-establishing the brand".

== See also ==
- List of frozen dessert brands
