= Ruby Jewel (company) =

Ice cream sandwich brand

- Type: Private
- Industry: Food
- Founded: 2004; 22 years ago in Portland, Oregon, United States
- Founder: Lisa Herlinger
- Headquarters: Portland, Oregon, United States
- Products: Ice cream sandwiches
- Website: rubyjewel.com

Ruby Jewel is a brand of ice cream sandwiches.

== Description ==
Ruby Jewel is an ice cream company. Ice cream sandwich varieties include:

- brown sugar cookie with strawberry ice cream
- chocolate chip with caramelized coffee ice cream
- oatmeal butterscotch
- oatmeal chocolate chip cookie with butterscotch ice cream
- peppermint chocolate
- pumpkin ginger
- s'mores: chocolate marshmallow cookies with honey graham ice cream

== History ==
Shop interior in 2012

Established by Lisa Herlinger in 2004, the business has also operated multiple shops in Portland, Oregon. The first opened on North Mississippi Avenue in 2010. A third shop opened on Hawthorne Boulevard in southeast Portland in 2015. A fourth shop opened in northwest Portland in 2019. The shops closed in 2020.
