= Golden Spoon =

American frozen yogurt retail chain

Golden Spoon Frozen Yogurt is a frozen yogurt retail chain headquartered in Rancho Santa Margarita, California. Stores are located in the western United States, mainly in California, Nevada and Arizona, and internationally in Tokyo and Sendai, Japan and Metro Manila, Philippines.

Golden Spoon stores provide a variety of frozen yogurt flavors and toppings. Employees serve the yogurt in cones or cups with their signature golden plastic spoon.

== History ==
=== 1980 - 1983 ===
The story begins in 1980 when Jeff Barnes purchases a Health food store called “Yogurt and Things” located in Tustin, California. Within a year of purchase (1981), Barnes drops the health food inventory to focus solely on creating frozen yogurt. He succeeded and his sales doubled at his original store within the first few years. In 1983, he rebrands as “Golden Spoon” and expands business south of California.

== See also ==
- List of frozen yogurt companies
- List of frozen dessert brands
