= Snack and a half =

Frozen ice cream treat made by Scotsburn

- Course: Dessert
- Main ingredients: Vanilla ice cream, oatmeal cookies, chocolate

Snack and Half (a.k.a. Snack and a Half) is a frozen ice cream treat made by Scotsburn. It is composed of vanilla ice cream squished between two oatmeal cookies and covered in chocolate.

== Availability ==
Snack and Half is sold individually in Canadian stores. In late 2017, ScotsBurn redesigned the packaging and renamed the ice cream treat as "Super Snack".

== See also ==
- List of frozen dessert brands
