= Fla-Vor-Ice =

Brand of freeze pops

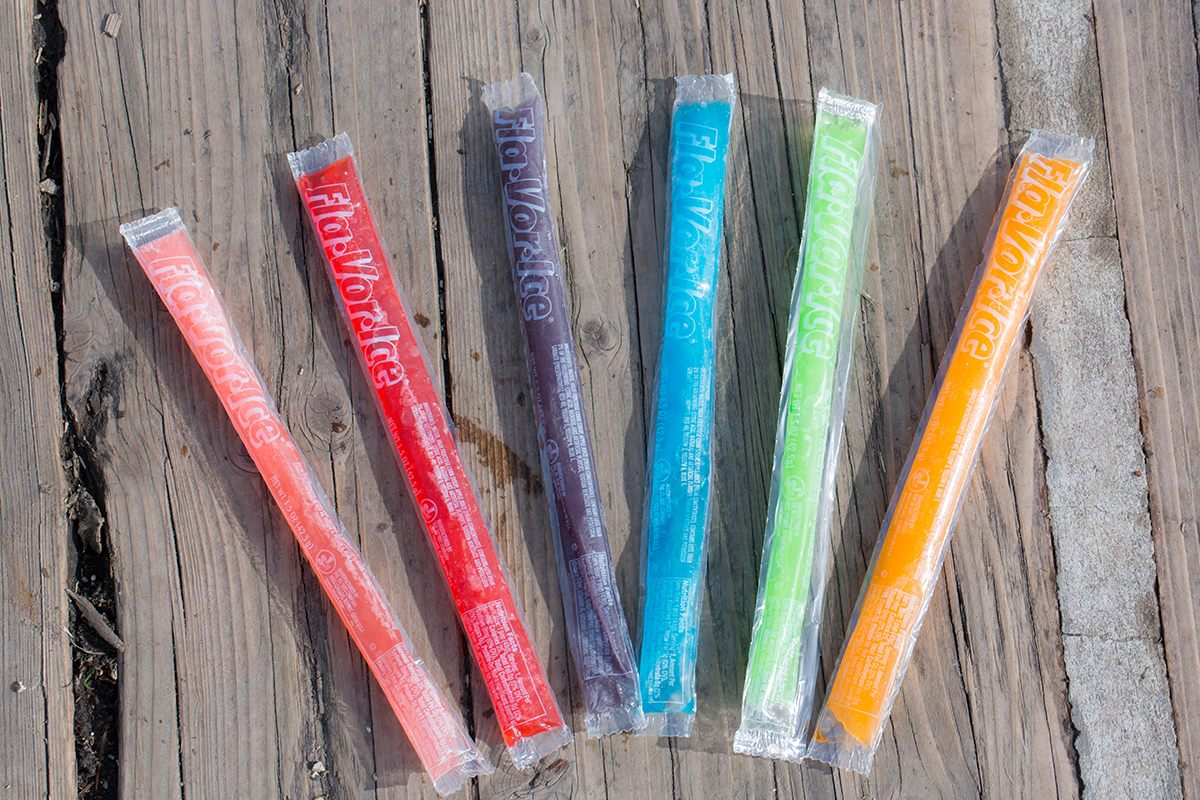
- Fla-Vor-Ice tube
- Course: Dessert
- Place of origin: United States
- Created by: Jel Sert
- Serving temperature: Cold
- Variations: Fla-Vor-Ice Light

Fla-Vor-Ice is the trademark name for a type of freezie. Unlike traditional popsicles, which include a wooden stick, Fla-Vor-Ice is sold in and eaten out of a plastic tube. Also unlike traditional popsicles, it is often sold in liquid form and requires the consumer to freeze the product at home. A vendor, though, may sell them frozen.

Fla-Vor-Ice produces 1.5 billion treats per year.

== Products ==
Fla-Vor-Ice is manufactured by the Jel Sert company and has, since its 1969 introduction, come to be the company's top seller. They come packaged in four varieties: Original, Light, Tropical, and Sport.

The Original variety includes six flavors - Lemon Lime (green), Grape (purple), Tropical Punch (pink), Orange (orange), Berry Punch (blue), and Strawberry (red).

The Tropical variety also includes six flavors, two of which are also included in the Original variety (Berry Punch and Tropical Punch), as well as four other flavors - Summer Punch (red), Citrus Punch (green), Pineapple (light yellow), and Mango (yellow).

The Light variety includes four of the original flavors (Lemon Lime, Grape, Berry Punch, and Strawberry), but they are sugar-free and low calorie. The Sport variety also has four flavors — Tropical (pink), Grape (purple), Orange (orange), and Blue Raspberry (blue).

The Sport pops are the newest to the Fla-Vor-Ice line and include electrolytes for rehydration purposes. All boxed varieties may be purchased in pop increments of 16 or 24, with the Tropical pops available in bulk cases of 100, and the Original pops also available in cases of 80, 100 or 200 pops.

== See also ==
- Otter Pops
- List of frozen dessert brands
