= Míša =

Czech frozen confection brand

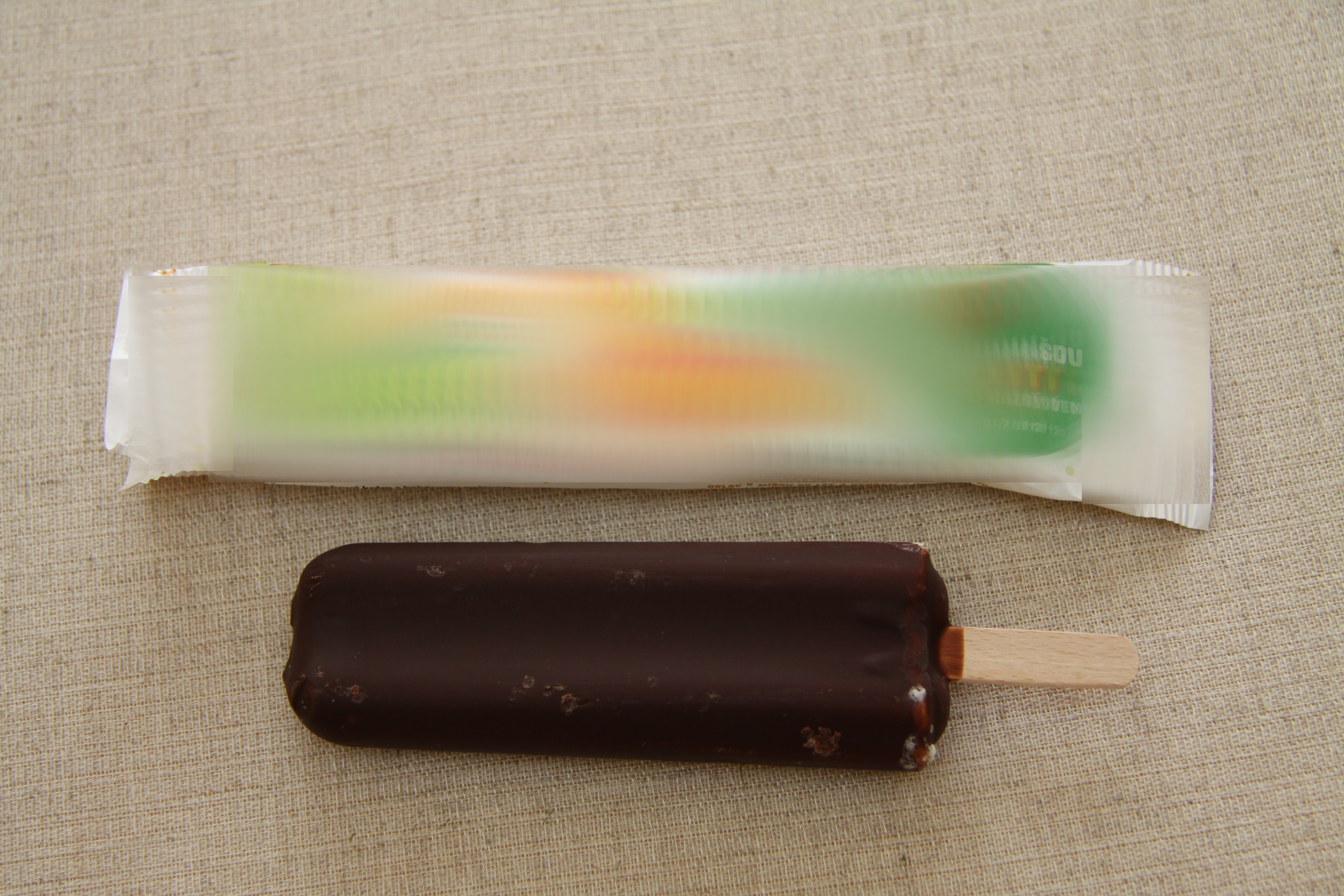
- Product type: Ice cream
- Current owner: Unilever
- Produced by: Algida
- Country: Czech Republic
- Introduced: 1962
- Tagline: Tvarohová svačinka
- Website: Official website

Míša is a popular Czech brand of frozen confection. Míšas have been made continuously since 1962, and sell over 12 million ice pops per year, making it the most successful ice cream brand in the Czech Republic. It has survived events such as the Velvet Revolution and is fondly remembered as an integral part of Czech childhood.

They are made with frozen quark, rather than ice cream or yogurt.

The logo features a grinning green bear as the brand's mascot, holding its arms above the word "Míša."

Since 2015, Míša is owned by Algida, part of Unilever.

== See also ==
- List of frozen dessert brands
