= Yumilicious =

Frozen yogurt chain based in Dallas, Texas

Yumilicious Frozen Yogurt
- Industry: Restaurants
- Founded: October 14, 2008; 17 years ago
- Founder: Christian Le (President)
- Headquarters: Dallas, Texas
- Number of locations: 15 yogurt lounges
- Key people: Salina Pham (CEO); Winston Phan (secretary); Beatrix Hofker (treasurer)
- Products: Frozen yogurts Frozen yogurt shakes
- Website: Yumi-licious.com; Yumilicious.CO

Yumilicious is a self-serve, frozen yogurt franchise known for unique sweet and tart frozen yogurts. There are currently 15 locations in the United States of which 13 locations are in Texas and two located in South Carolina.

== Overview ==
The first Yumilicious yogurt lounge opened in the Cityplace neighborhood of Uptown Dallas, Texas, on 14 October 2008. Originally known as Yogilicious, the company was concerned that the name "sounded too much like the names of other frozen yogurt stores", and changed the name to Yumilicious in 2009.

Yumilicious launched a mobile customer loyalty program with the mobile consumer engagement platform, Mocapay, on 10 May 2012.

== See also ==
- List of frozen yogurt companies
- List of frozen dessert brands
