= Haunted House Ice Cream =

Ice cream brand

Haunted House Ice Cream was an ice cream produced in the UK by a company called Lyons Maid. It first went on sale in July 1973 and cost 4p.

The ice cream itself was white, and a picture was printed on it in edible ink. There were eight pictures in total: Frankenstein's Monster, a spook, a skeleton, a spider and web, some bats, a wicked witch and a creature. The pictures were shown in one of the following colors: pink, orange, red, green and blue. It was impossible to determine which picture was on the ice cream until the wrapper was opened.

== See also ==
- List of frozen dessert brands
