= Little Jimmy's Italian Ices =

Ice cream company

Little Jimmy's Italian Ice
- Type: Private
- Founded: 1932
- Founder: Albert Mauro
- Headquarters: Iselin, New Jersey, USA
- Key people: Ralph Maglione
- Products: Italian ice and push carts
- Website: http://italianice.net/

Little Jimmy's Italian Ices is a family-owned Italian ice manufacturing firm headquartered in Iselin, New Jersey. Pushcart owners around the country purchase Little Jimmy's Italian Ices from the ten-employee firm, running their carts as independent businesses.

== History ==
Soon after emigrating from Sicily in 1932, Albert Mauro began making granita in his new home of Elizabeth, New Jersey. Working with one machine in his home, Mauro made the dessert from his family recipe and loaded up his truck. He drove the streets of Elizabeth and Linden, New Jersey and parked outside the General Motors plant at the beginning and end of every shift. Eventually, Mauro added three more trucks and two more machines.

In 2005, Little Jimmy's began offering its products nationwide as an Italian ice concession business, selling in some 35 states.

In 2014, Little Jimmy's was purchased by Maglione's Italian Ice of Iselin, New Jersey. The Italian ice franchising continues under the Little Jimmy's name.

== See also ==
- List of frozen dessert brands
