= Dole Whip =

Soft serve frozen dessert

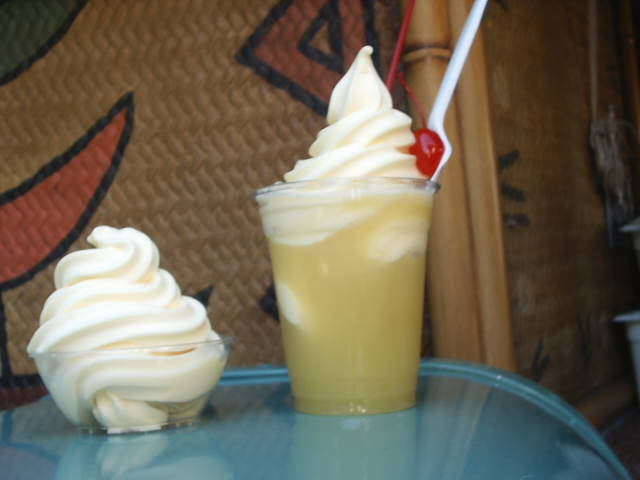
Dole Whip and Dole Whip float as served at Walt Disney World

Dole Whip (also known as Dole Soft Serve) is a soft serve dairy-free frozen dessert created by Dole Food Company in 1983. Prior to 2023, when Dole Whip began to be sold at retailers, Dole Whip was served at Disney theme parks and Dole Soft Serve was sold elsewhere. The original pineapple flavor is the best known, and additional fruit flavors are sold. Similar or identical desserts modeled after the Dole Whip but not manufactured or served by Dole are generically called pineapple whip.

== Description ==
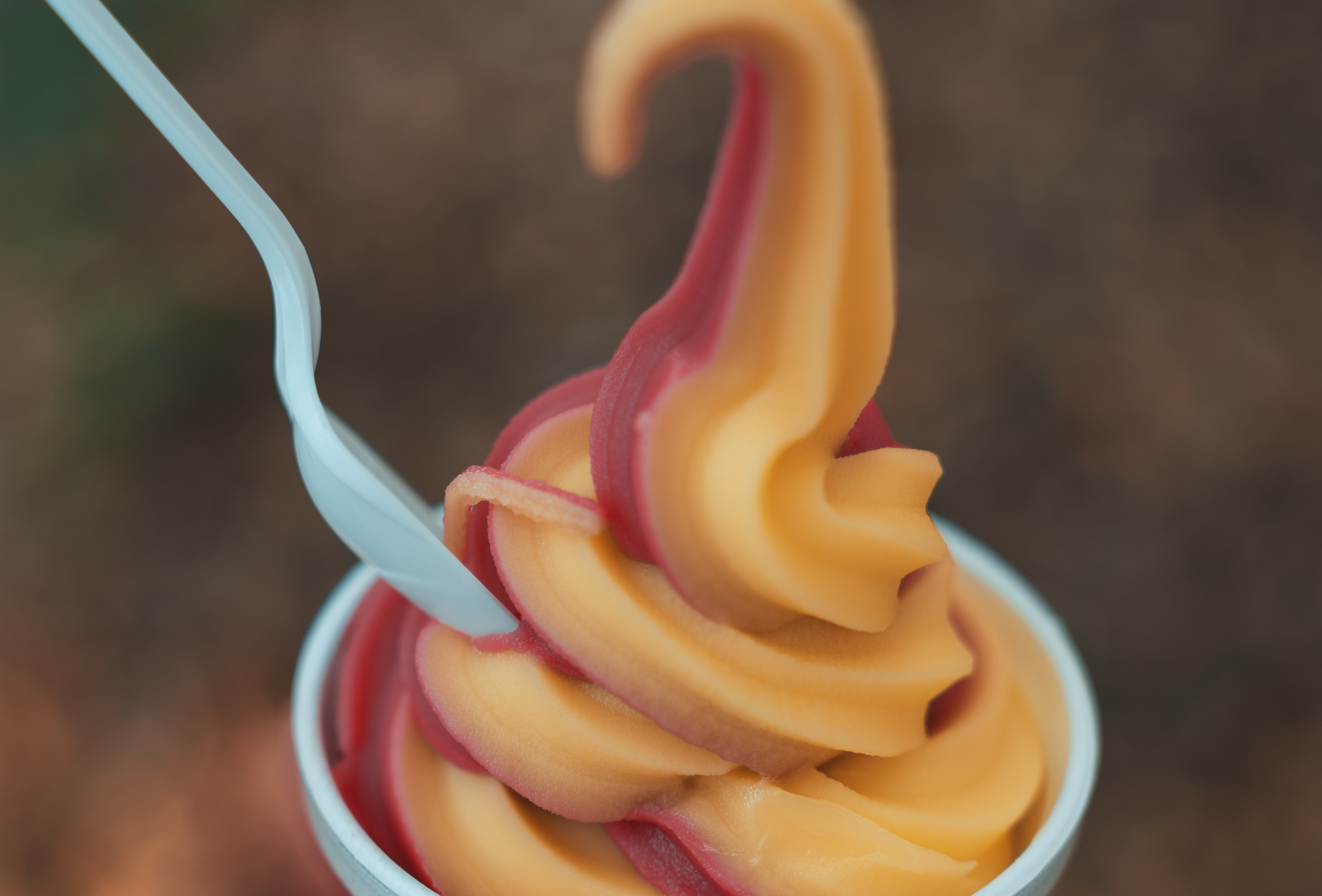
Raspberry-pineapple swirl Dole Whip

=== Ingredients ===
The Dole Whip is made with powder and water in a soft serve machine, though Disney published a recipe in 2020 to allow people to create their own Dole Whips at home during the COVID-19 pandemic albeit this recipe had different ingredients from the soft serve including ice cream. Since at least 2013, Dole Whip has been made with exclusively vegan ingredients, and it has always been gluten-free.

=== Calories ===
According to Kent Consumer Brands Americas (formerly Kent Precision Foods Group), the exclusive manufacturer of the Dole Soft Serve mix served in Disney parks as Dole Whip, one 2/3 cup (~160 mL) prepared serving contains 110 calories and 0.5 g of fat. In contrast, the retail Dole Whip produced by Dole Packaged Foods contains 260 calories for the same serving, primarily due to its significantly higher fat content (9 g of fat from added coconut and sunflower oils).

== History ==
Dole Whip was created by Dole Food Company at the Dole Technical Center in San Jose, California by food scientist Kathy Westphal in 1983. In 1976, Dole took over from United Airlines as the sponsor of Walt Disney's Enchanted Tiki Room (an attraction inside the Adventureland section of Disneyland), offering pineapple juice & fruit spears, and in 1983 sponsoring the Florida version of the attraction (titled "Tropical Serenade") at Walt Disney World's Magic Kingdom Park, serving vanilla soft-serve ice cream topped with diced pineapples. A recent graduate from UC Davis, Westphal was tasked with formulating a non-dairy, dry-mix version of the soft-serve ice cream that would withstand Florida’s heat. William Goldfield, director of global corporate communications for Dole Food Company, explains “Dole kitchens were focused on creating a brilliant fruit flavor and colorful true-to-fruit soft serve product. It was made primarily for Disney but was introduced a short time before being added to the parks.” After a soft launch of the product in 1983, it debuted at Magic Kingdom in 1984 as Dole Pineapple Whip. It became available at Disneyland in 1986.

Dole Whip debuted in Florida with three flavors: pineapple, orange, and strawberry—but only pineapple was available at Disneyland. In December 2018, Disneyland opened the Tropical Hideaway, which offers a seating and dining area for Adventureland. With more soft-serve machines they were able to offer more Dole Whip flavors and combinations.

As of 2023, Dole Whip is available for purchase in retail stores but this product has different ingredients.

== Cultural impact ==
Dole Whip has achieved a cult following among Disney park-goers, allowing merchandise to be created in the Disney Snacks merchandise category.

== See also ==
- List of frozen dessert brands
