= Keventers Milkshake =

Indian milkshake brand and restaurant chain

The logo of Keventers Milkshake

Keventers Milkshake is an Indian milkshake brand and chain of restaurants and kiosks that began operating in 1925. The brand mostly dissolved in the 1970s and was revived starting in 2014. It is owned by Super Milk Products Private Limited. In 2021, the company had a combined total of over 200 Keventers Milkshake restaurants and outlets in India. Keventers Milkshake specializes good in classic and custom-style milkshakes and claims that it is the first milkshake brand made in India.

== History ==
Keventers Milkshake was founded in 1925 by Edward Keventer, a Danish dairy entrepreneur and technologist who the British Government recruited in 1889 to modernize India's dairy industry. Keventer moved to India in 1889, and in 1894 purchased the floundering Aligarh Dairy in the United Provinces. Realizing success and profitability in revitalizing the dairy, Keventer established another dairy farm in 1925 in the Chanakyapuri area of New Delhi, India. Within a decade Keventer had established eponymous plants in Delhi, Aligarh, Calcutta and Darjeeling.

After Keventer died in 1937, industrialist Ram Krishna Dalmia, a Keventers distributor at the time, bought the brand in 1940. Dalmia diversified the company into producing powdered milk, condensed milk, milkshakes and ice creams. The company's expansion expanded to 48 distribution points around the National Capital Region in Delhi. Keventers also became a major supplier of milk, powdered milk, condensed milk and biscuits to the Indian Army for several decades up until the 1970s.

In the 1970s, Keventers' primary plant in Chanakyapuri was forced closed by the Indian government to further expand the diplomatic enclave there. After this, Dalmia focused his energy on other business notions, losing interest in the Keventers brand. A small number of Keventers outlets continued to exist, run by a few of its remaining distributors.

== Today ==
Keventers is owned by New Delhi-based Super Milk Products Private Limited, which also produces other dairy products. Keventers specializes in classic and custom-style milkshakes. Today, the company is known by consumers in part for its unique foil-topped, vintage-style glass milkshake bottles, which customers are allowed to take with them when they leave.

In 2014, Agastya Dalmia, the grandson of Ram Krishna Dalmia partnered with his friend Aman Arora in attempts to revive the brand, working in part with a few old recipes of the milkshake that Ram Krishna Dalmia had devised. As Dalmia and Arora had no experience in the restaurant business, they attempted to recruit restaurateur Sohrab Sitaram in their endeavor, who declined the offer to work with the brand at the time. Dalmia and Arora continued anyway, opening their first restaurant in the Pitampura area of Delhi in 2014, but did not meet success, closing less than a year later. Sitaram later eventually joined as a partner in the endeavor.

In 2019, the company went to the Delhi High Court in protest about one of the company's licensees, which was alleged to have been purveying Keventers products using inferior milk. During that time, the judge stated to company lawyers that he had sampled products at several outlets and that the brand is "no longer as good as it used to be" and deemed them as "not at all fit for consumption." At the time, the franchisee stated that they had made significant improvements, and the judge stated that the licensee and Keventers should utilize dispute resolution mediation to resolve the matter, and did not impose any injunction against the licensee. After the judge's statement, some consumers discussed the matter on Twitter expressing disappointment with the product.

In 2021, the company had a combined total of over 200 kiosks, cafés and brick-and-mortar restaurants in India and also has a presence in Dubai, United Arab Emirates; Nairobi, Kenya; and Nepal.

== See also ==
- List of frozen dessert brands
