= Bonice =

Colombian frozen dessert brand

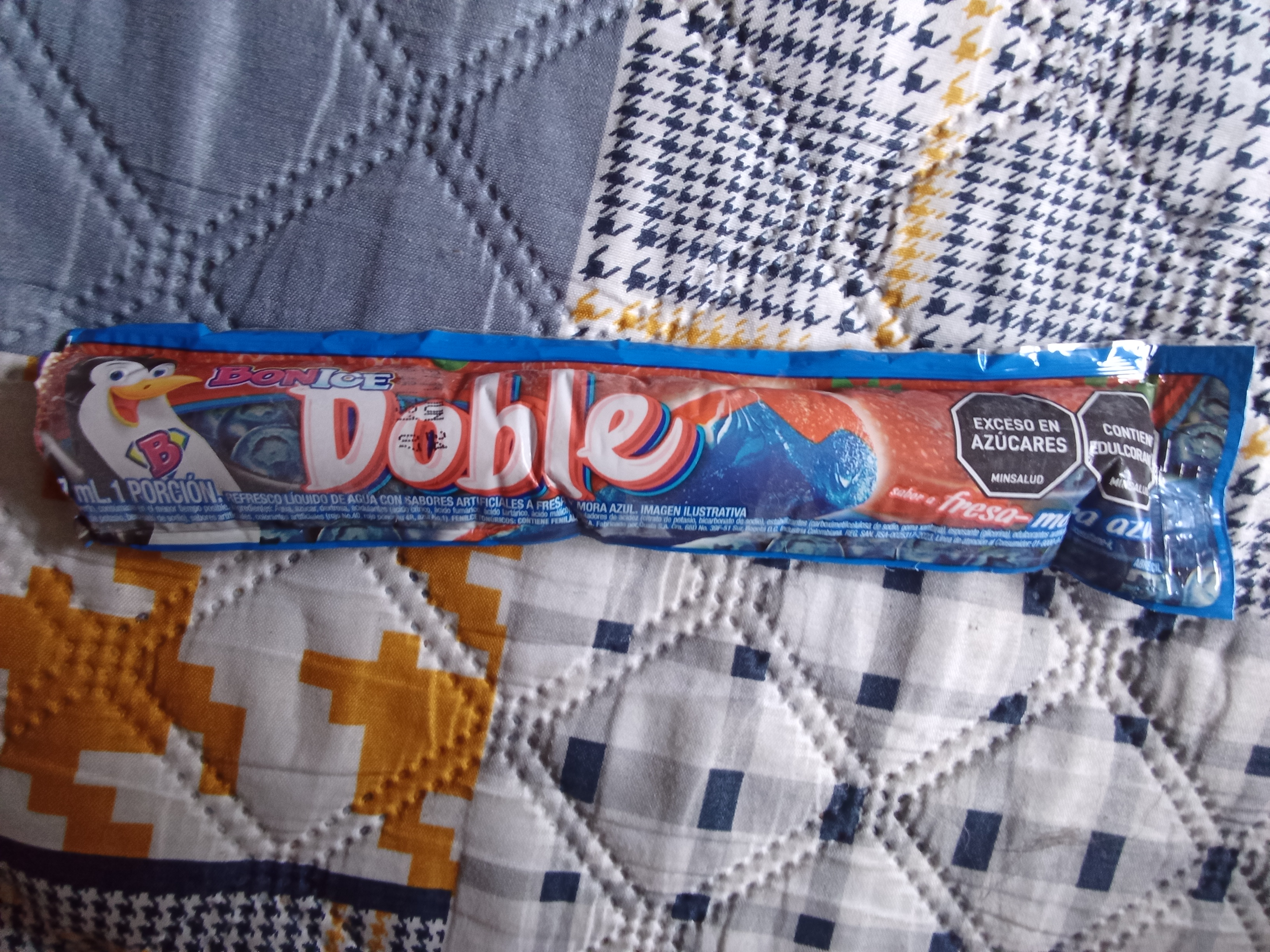
BonIce product.

BonIce is a brand of freezie owned by a subsidiary of Quala, a multinational Colombian company. It arrived to Mexico City in August 2004. It was quickly expanded in places like Guadalajara in June 2005, Villahermosa November 2005, Monterrey February 2006, Tijuana September 2006 and Brazil 2011/2012, with the name "Icegurt". Today it is available in over a hundred cities in all states across the country, and in other Central American countries. The product is sold direct to consumers on the streets by independent distributors, nicknamed "Hombre de Bonice" (Bonice Guy), coordinated under a franchise structure.

== Flavors ==
- Strawberry
- Grape
- Mango
- Green Mango
- Lime
- Guanabana
- Pineapple
- Spicy Tamarind
- Watermelon
- Cherry
- Green Apple
- Blueberry
- Kiwi
- Chocolate
- Mystery Flavor

They also come with yogurt, or with two flavors combined called Bonice Doble (Double Bonice). The ads for Bonice Doble had 2 female twins and used a parody of the 2013 Robin Thicke single "Blurred Lines".

== Mexicana ==
Mexicana (Mexican), or by its full name Mexicana con Orgullo (Mexican with Pride), is a carbonated soft drink produced by the Colombian company Quala and its Mexican subsidiary of Freezies Bonice. Its sale began at the end of March 2022.

== See also ==
- List of frozen dessert brands
