= Quala =

Colombian multinational company

Quala S.A.
- Company type: S.A.
- Industry: Massive consumption
- Founded: 1980 in Bogotá; Colombia
- Headquarters: Bogotá; Colombia
- Products: Dairy products, Mass consumption products
- Number of employees: 6,000
- Website: www.quala.com.co

Quala S.A. is a multi-national massive production enterprise that creates and distributes food, beverages, personal care products, ice-based desserts, and candies, among others. Its headquarters is located in Bogotá (Colombia) operating also in Mexico, Dominican Republic, Ecuador, Peru and Venezuela. They sell a large amount of dairy products within Colombia.

== History ==
In 1980, Michael de Rhodes founded Quala in a small warehouse in Bogotá. There a group of 7 people started the production of Instacrem. During 1983 Quala relocated to its new and lager headquarters situated on Bogotá. It is a large company within Colombia with its variety of products for daily use or consumption.

== Products ==
- Colombia: InstaCrem, BatiCrema, Batilado, Quipitos, Hogareña, La Sopera, Frutiño, Gelatina Frutiño, Gallina, FamiliaYá, BonIce, Activade, Del Fogón, LightYá, Ricostilla, Gelagurt, Savital, Yogoso, Popetas, PulpiFruta, Fortident, Gustiarroz, Sasóned, Frutive, Ego, Boka, SunTea, Vive 100, Aromatel, Don Gustico, BioExpert, Nutribela and Cerebrit.
- Dominican Republic: Doña Gallina, Criollito, Juvena, JugosYá, Bontea, Ricompleto and Vive100.
- Venezuela: BonIce, El Criollito, Frutimax, Ricostilla, Savital, Fortident and Ego.
- Ecuador: Aromatel, Ego, Savital, Fortident, BonIce, BonTea, Yogoso, JugosYá, Doña Gallina and Quipitos.
- Mexico: Bonice, YogurIce, Frutimax, Gelafrut, Ego, Vive 100%, Savilé, Suntea and Riko Pollo, BioExpert and Refresco Mexicana con Orgullo.
- Peru: Savital, Ego and BonTea.
