= My-T-Fine =

Pudding brand

My-T-Fine is a brand of pudding now marketed by Jel Sert.

== History ==
Puddings are similar to custards, but thickened with cornstarch instead of eggs. Powdered mixes for puddings originated in England, where Andrew Bird created and began selling a mix for a cornstarch based custard in 1837. Puddings soon caught on in the United States as well, where My-T-Fine began selling the first boxed pudding mix (chocolate) in 1918. My-T-Fine continues today, marketing powdered pudding mixes in a variety of flavors.

- Chocolate
- Lemon
- Vanilla
- Butterscotch
- Tapioca Vanilla
- Chocolate Fudge
- Pumpkin
- Tiramisu
- Sugar-Free Chocolate
- Sugar-Free Vanilla
