= Freaky Ice =

Frozen alcoholic confection

Freaky Ice is a frozen ice confection, originating in the Netherlands. It is produced by Integrated Beverage Group, Ltd., (IBG) and contains up to 4.8% alcohol.

== New York ban ==
In 2004, the New York Division of Alcoholic Beverage Control denied Integrated Beverage Group the permission to sell Freaky Ice in the state, citing the hazard of the product to children. It also criticized IBG on selling a product that would appeal to children.

== See also ==
- List of frozen dessert brands
