= All Sport =

Sports drink

- Type: Nutrient Enhanced Sports Drink Beverage
- Manufacturer: All Sport, Inc. (distributed by Jel Sert)
- Origin: United States
- Introduced: 1993
- Website: drinkallsport.com

All Sport is a brand of sports drink. Although comparatively lacking popularity and brand recognition, its competitors include Gatorade and Powerade.

== History ==
All Sport was launched by PepsiCo in 1994 as a competitor to The Coca-Cola Company’s Powerade and Gatorade, which at the time was a separate entity owned by Quaker Oats. After PepsiCo's 2001 acquisition of Quaker, All Sport was sold to the Monarch Beverage Company before being acquired by Big Red in 2007.

In 2018, All Sport was acquired by Keurig Dr Pepper through an acquisition. Jel Sert became the primary manufacturer of the brand's powdered drink portfolio. This would later lead Jel Sert to make the decision to acquire the business in late 2019.

== Products ==
All Sport products deliver 100% daily value of vitamin C per serving. All Sport currently offers the following products:

=== All Sport Body Quenchers Powder ===
- Variety Pack
- Blue Raz Ice
- Lemon Lime
- Orange
- Fruit Punch
- Grape

=== All Sport Zero Powder Sticks ===
- Blue Raz Zero
- Fruit Punch Zero
- Lemon Lime Zero
- Orange Zero
- Grape Zero
- Variety Pack

=== All Sport Freezer Pops ===
- Variety Pack
- Blue Raz Ice
- Fruit Punch
- Lemon Lime
- Orange

=== All Sport Sugar Free Freezer Pops ===
- Variety Pack
- Blue Raz Ice
- Fruit Punch
- Lemon Lime
- Orange

== Sponsorships ==
All Sport has sponsored several athletes and teams.

- Tommy Kendall in the Trans-Am Series throughout the nineties
- Alexi Lalas, soccer
- John Daly, PGA Professional Golfer
- Germain Racing with Mike Skinner, NASCAR
- Travis Kvapil, of Yates Racing Team
- Enrique Bernoldi, Indy 500 and Sonoma Raceway
- Erick Dampier, Dallas Basketball Center
- Jeremy Mayfield
- Cedric Benson, former NFL runningback
