= Otter Pops =

US freezie brand

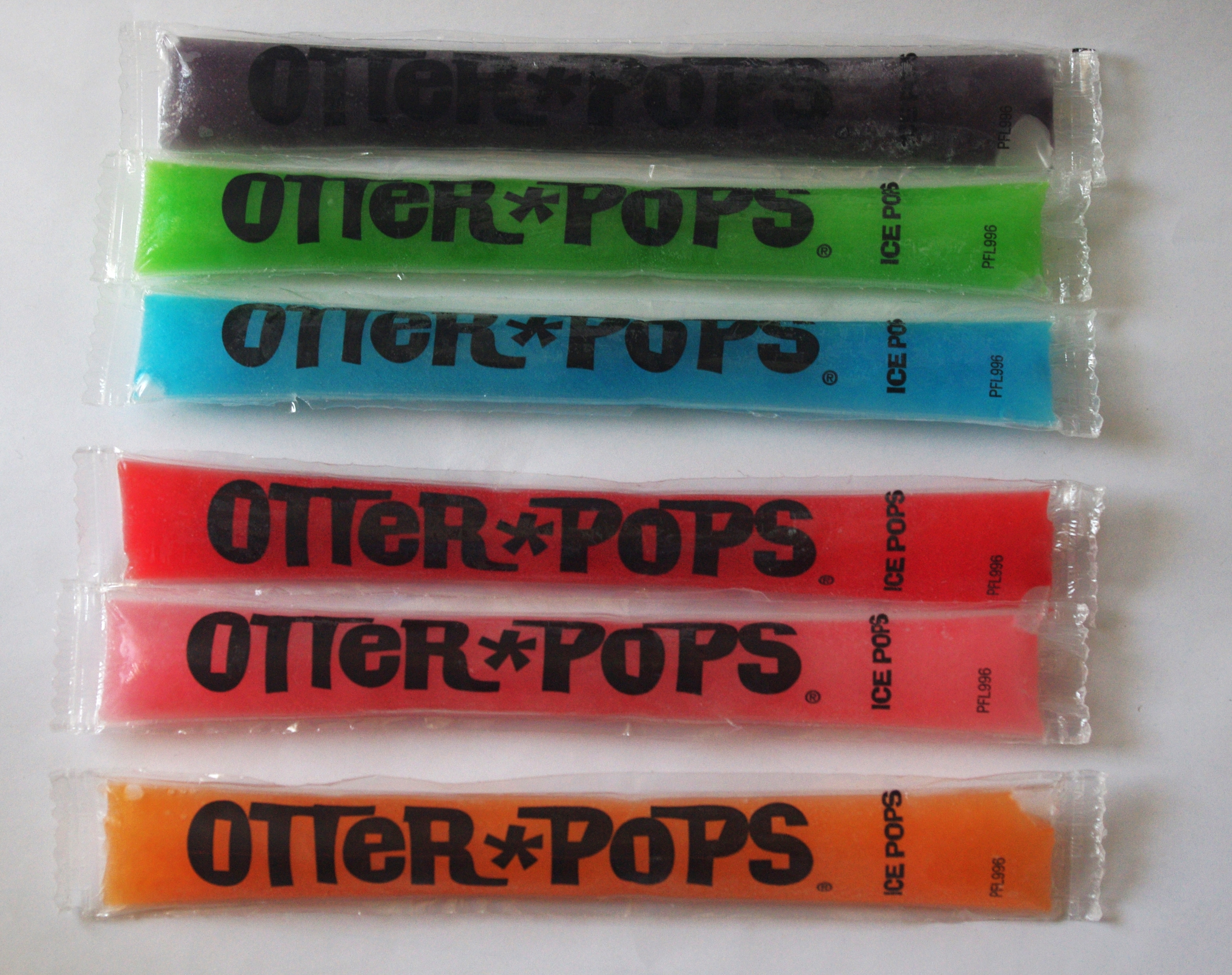
Otter pops (frozen)

Otter Pops are a brand of freeze pops sold in the United States. The product consists of a clear plastic tube filled with a fruit-flavored, often artificially colored liquid. It is one of the earliest brands marketing a rendition of this dessert.

Some varieties claim to contain 100% fruit juice, mostly apple juice, and appear clear, as though no colors are added. Otter Pops are marketed as a frozen treat, but stores generally sell them at room temperature for the consumer to later freeze at home.

== Background ==
National Pax introduced Otter Pops in 1970, in competition with Jel Sert's similar product, Fla-Vor-Ice. As of 1990, the product was manufactured by Merrytime Products Inc. of Marshall, Texas.

In 1996, Jel Sert acquired the rights to Otter Pops as well. During the 2000s, Jel Sert modified the Otter Pops recipe to add more fruit juice. The company's manufacturing facilities are in West Chicago, Illinois. Otter Pops come in 1-, 1.5-, 2- and 5.5-ounce serving sizes. They also come in 10 flavors, each named after a different character:

- Blue (blue raspberry): Louie-Bloo Raspberry
- Red (strawberry): Strawberry Short Kook
- Pink (fruit punch): Poncho Punch
- Yellow (lemon): Rip Van Lemon (discontinued in the late 1970s)
- Green (lime): Sir Isaac Lime
- Purple (grape): Alexander the Grape
- Orange (orange): Little Orphan Orange
- Gold (mango): Major Mango
- Yellow (pineapple) DJ Tropicool
- White (coconut) Cosmic Coconut
- Cyan (tropical punch) Anita Fruit Punch
- Red (cherry) Scarlett O'Cherry (discontinued in the mid 1990s)

== Sir Isaac Lime protest ==
In 1995, National Pax had planned to replace the "Sir Isaac Lime" flavor with "Scarlett O'Cherry". A fourth-grade student in Costa Mesa, California learned of the change on the company's World Wide Web site, and organized a petition and picket with his cousins against it; a Stanford professor wrote in support, calling it "Otter-cide". Told the change was final, the protest continued as planned, in the rain. The CEO relented, keeping it, despite it being the least popular flavour. The fourth-grader appeared on The Tonight Show with Jay Leno soon after. An Internet fan site claims that National Pax packaged the cherry mix as strawberry.

== Other uses ==
Over the generations, other uses of Otter Pops have been devised and shared in the US. They can be used as a colorful substitute for ice in a punch bowl or to flavor mixed drinks.

== See also ==
- Pop (frozen snack)
- Fla-Vor-Ice
- List of frozen dessert brands
