= Palapa Azul =

Mexican-themed American ice cream company

Palapa Azul ice creams

Palapa Azul is a frozen desserts company based in Los Angeles, California. The company, founded in 2002 by Mexico City natives Michel Algazi and Roni Goldberg, produces Mexican-style ice cream, sorbet, and frozen fruit bars that are sold in retail stores throughout the United States. Palapa Azul is also a member of NASFT (National Association of the Specialty Food Trade).

The Mexican emphasis results in marketing flavors that are not commonly found in mainstream American frozen desserts, such as sweet corn ice cream and hibiscus flower (Jamaica) sorbet, as well as Mexican versions of common flavors, such as cajeta, a Mexican goat milk-based caramel — often used for dulce de leche — and Mexican chocolate, which is spiced with cinnamon. The frozen fruit bars, which in 2004 were the first products launched by the company, include cucumber-chile and mango-chile mixtures along with single-flavor bars in Mexican papaya, strawberry, mango, watermelon, cantaloupe, grapefruit and pineapple. The company's founders have said that during their initial one-on-one product research in California farmer's markets, they found gender-based differences in flavor preferences: "Women would say, 'You have mango-chile? Interesting! I'd like to try that.' Men would say, 'You have mango-chile. Interesting! I'd like strawberry.' ... We could offer two dozen flavors, and still most men would want strawberry." Tested flavors that have not been introduced to date include prickly pear, plum and kiwi.

The fruit bars were introduced at the Winter International Fancy Food Show, a trade show for the foodservice industry, in January 2004, where the product was named "Best of Show" by several top retailers and media outlets. The ice cream and sorbet products were introduced in June 2005.

== See also ==
- List of frozen dessert brands
