= Zooper Dooper =

Brand of ice block

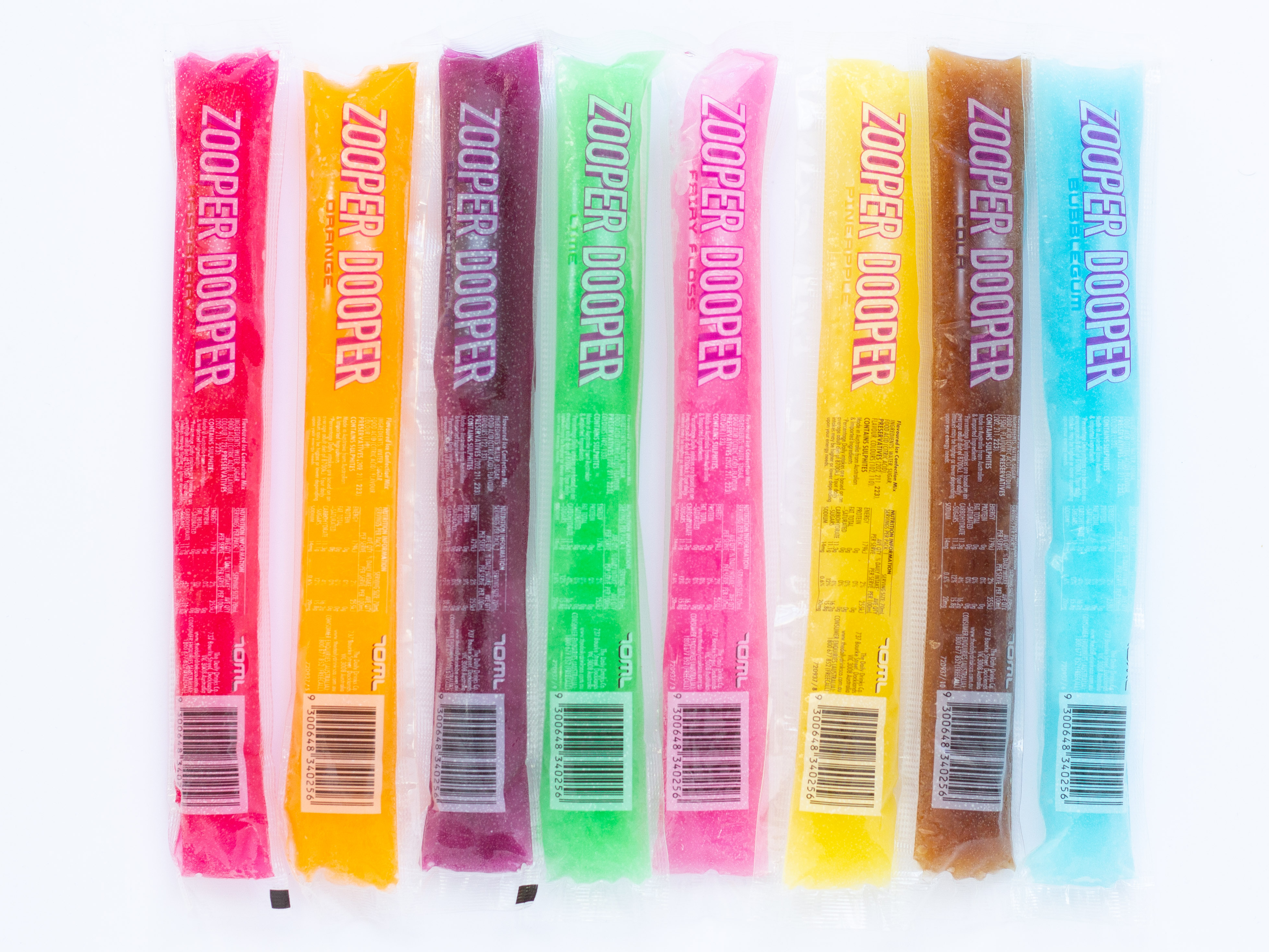
Frozen Zooper Doopers

Zooper Doopers are an Australian brand of ice blocks. They generally come in a plastic tube packaging as a liquid. They are then frozen at home in the household freezer. Zooper Doopers are somewhat of a cultural icon and have been popular since they first appeared in 1971. They are produced by Bega Dairy & Drinks.

== Flavours ==
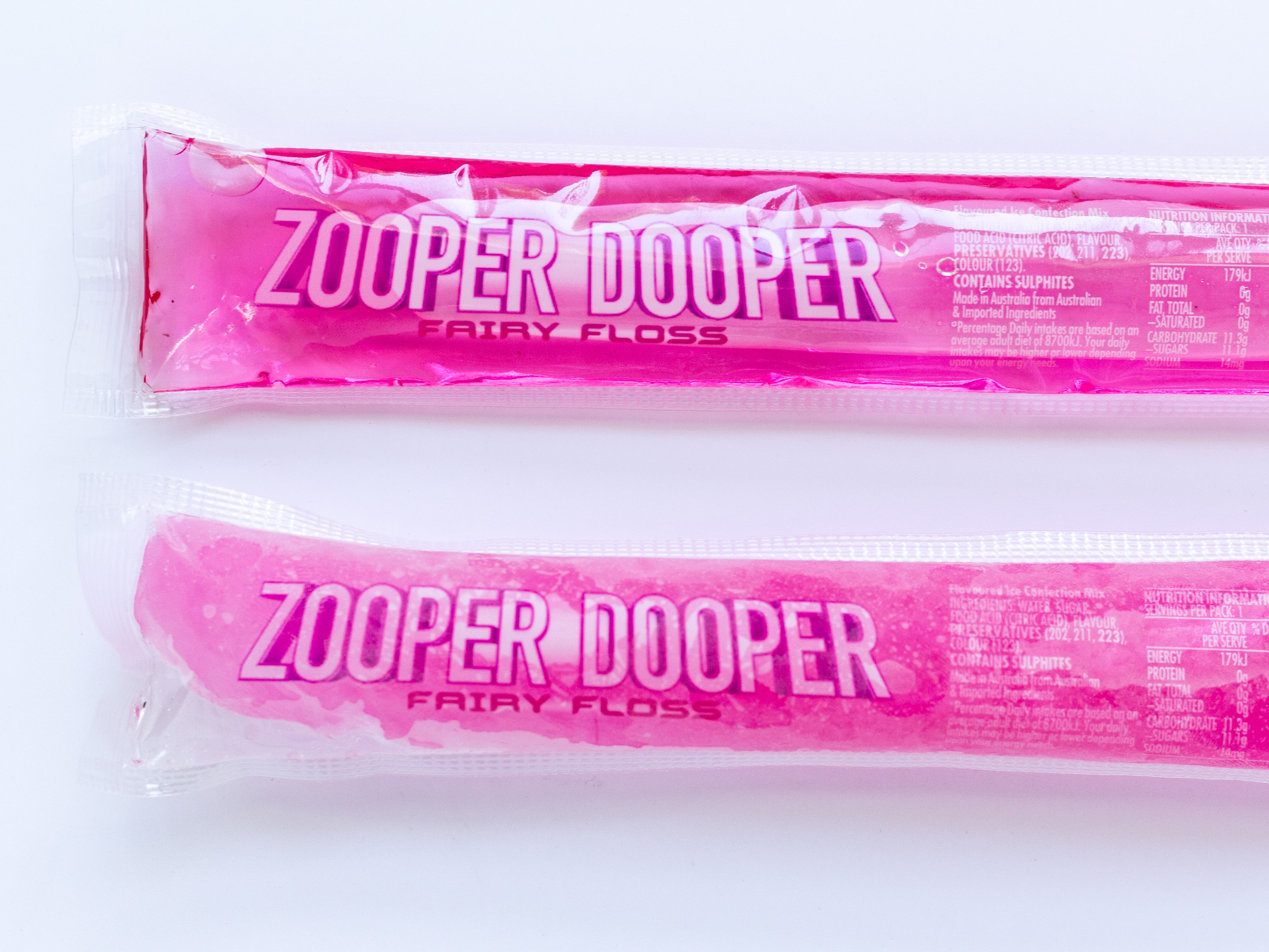
An unfrozen (top) and frozen (bottom) fairy floss flavoured Zooper Dooper

Zooper Doopers come in 8 different flavours, raspberry, fairy floss, cola, blackcurrant, orange, pineapple, lime and bubblegum. Once frozen, the top of the plastic tube can be cut, exposing the frozen product within which can then be eaten from the tube. A sugar-free line was also introduced in 2019, which comes in six different flavours - cola, raspberry, blackcurrant, blue lemonade, pineapple, and fairy floss.

Cosmic Lemon sherbet was an original flavour but has since been discontinued and replaced with pineapple.

=== Limited edition ===
In October 1996, National Foods Beverages Group introduced two new flavours, bubblegum and honeycomb, as well as a Zooper Dooper Joystick. The Joystick was a 150ml extended version of the original Zooper Dooper, as opposed to the original 70ml variety.

There are also limited edition "sourz" and "magic" varieties. Zooper Dooper Sourz come in watermelon, blackcurrant, apple, lemon, raspberry, and grape flavours, while the magic variety comes in lemonade, red creamy soda, banana candy, toffee apple, grape bubblegum, orange sherbert, strawberries & cream, and jaffa.

Store exclusive 'Your Zooper Dooper Favourites' bags were also available for a limited time in two varieties, each containing only two flavours from the standard lineup. Fairy floss and blackcurrant bags were only available at Coles and lime and cola bags were only available at Woolworths. Limited edition single-flavour packs have also been released.

== Derivative products ==
In 2021, Bega released a limited edition range of Zooper Dooper milk, available in pineapple, bubblegum, and raspberry flavours. In 2022, fairy floss and cola spider flavours were released.

== Cultural impact ==
In 2019, as part of The Great Aussie Coin Hunt, the Royal Australian Mint released a $1 coin commemorating the Zooper Dooper, along with other Australian "icons" such as meat pies and didgeridoos.

== Distribution ==
As of 2026, the brand produces over 371 million tubes a year and is distributed nationwide.
