= Jel Sert =

American snack food corporation

The Jel Sert Company
- Company type: Private
- Founded: 1926; 100 years ago
- Headquarters: West Chicago, Illinois, U.S.
- Products: Frozen Novelties, Powdered Drink Mixes, Powdered Dessert Mixes
- Website: http://www.jelsert.com

The Jel Sert Company is a privately held company based in West Chicago, Illinois, United States. Established in 1926, it specializes in making drink mixes, dessert mixes (pudding and gelatin), and frozen novelties.

== History and products ==
The Jel Sert Company was named after its original product, a gelatin dessert mix, by combining the words jelly and dessert. In 1929, Jel Sert created a powdered drink mix called Flavor Aid. These two products remained Jel Sert's flagship products until the 1960s when the company acquired Pop-Ice and its line of frozen ice pop desserts. Later that decade Jel Sert introduced Fla-Vor-Ice, another freezer pop, to complement its Flavor Aid drink mix line. Fla-Vor-Ice quickly became the leading freezer pop brand in the United States.

Otter Pops were acquired by the company in 1996. Similar to Jel Sert's other freezer pops, the Otter Pop brand is perhaps the strongest on the United States' West Coast and features flavor-based characters such as Lil' Orphan Orange, Sir Isaac Lime, and Strawberry Short Kook. In 1999, the company signed a promotional deal with General Mills' Honey Nut Cheerios to promote its freezer bars.

In 2000, Jel Sert acquired three other trademarks: Wyler's, a brand of powdered beverage mixes, and the Royal and My-T-Fine brands of puddings, pie fillings, and flan. In 2001 it bought Nabisco's gelatin, pudding and baking powder businesses, including Royal gelatin - one of the main competitors of Kraft Foods' Jell-O. In 2012, Jel Sert acquired Super C, Pure Kick and Zoic from Solis Brands. It has also acquired All Sport in 2020. Jel Sert also sells alcoholic freezer pops.

In 2021, Jel Sert partnered with Coca-Cola to launch Powerade freezer pops nationally. In 2024, Jel Sert and Mars collaborated to market Milky Way- and Snickers-flavored pudding and pie mix.

In April 2025, Jamba and Jel Sert partnered to create a line drink mix called Jamba Singles to Go.

The Jel Sert Company has done charity work with the American Childhood Cancer Organization, the National Ovarian Cancer Coalition, and Operation Homefront.
