= Blue raspberry flavor =

Food flavoring

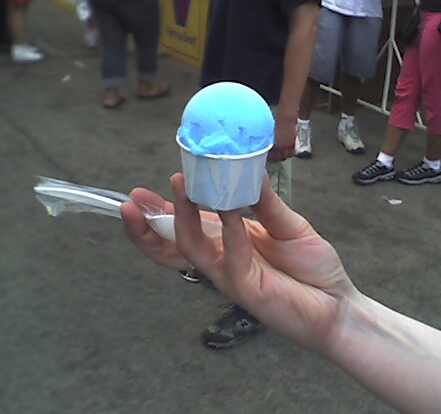
A cup of blue raspberry Italian ice at the Taste of Chicago festival

Blue raspberry is a flavor and food coloring for candy, snack foods, syrups, and soft drinks. The flavor does not derive from any species of raspberry, but rather was developed using esters that are part of the flavor profile of pineapple, banana, and cherry. Sugar is commonly added to create taste appeal for the blue raspberry flavor.

Food products labeled as blue raspberry flavor are commonly dyed with a bright blue synthetic food coloring, such as brilliant blue FCF, also called FD&C Blue No. 1 or European food coloring number E133.

The blue color was used to differentiate raspberry-flavored foods from those for cherry, watermelon, and strawberry, each of which is typically red or pink. The use of blue dye is also partially due to the FDA's 1976 banning of Red Dye No. 2, which had previously been commonly used in raspberry-flavored products.

== Composition ==
"Blue raspberry" flavors used in confectionery and frozen beverages are typically formulated from aroma chemicals blended to suggest fresh raspberry, and then colored with FD&C Blue No. 1.

== History ==
Blue raspberry flavoring debuted commercially in the United States in 1958 with snow cone syrup. Its wider adoption followed the FDA 1969 approval of FD&C Blue No. 1. This regulatory change encouraged other companies, including The Icee Company and Otter Pops, to introduce blue raspberry products in the early 1970s.

== See also ==
- Rubus leucodermis – a fruit-bearing plant that is sometimes called the "blue raspberry"
