= It's-It Ice Cream =

American ice cream company

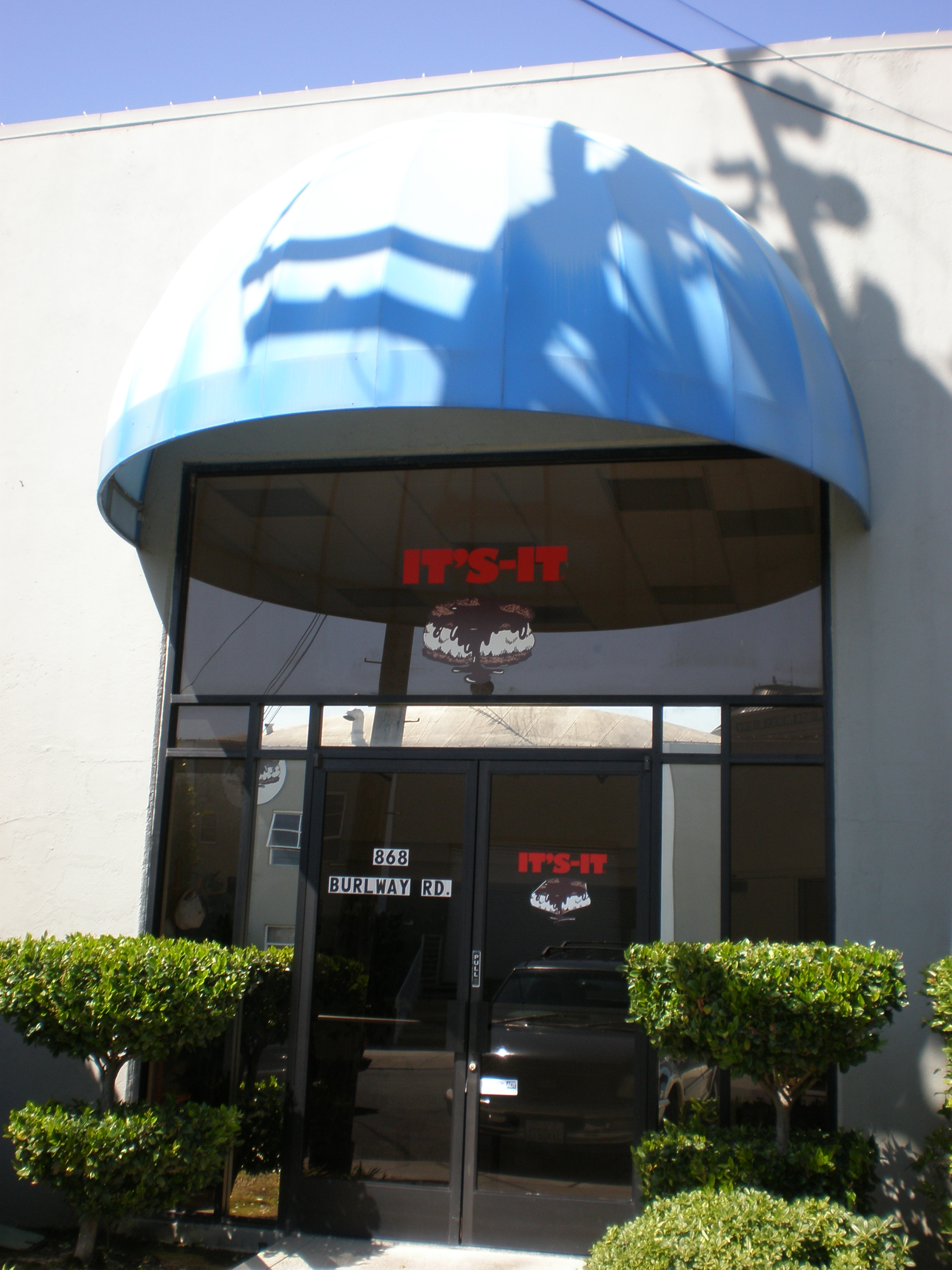
The It's-It Ice Cream company headquarters in Burlingame, California

It's-It Ice Cream is an ice cream manufacturer and distributor based in Burlingame, California. The company is best known for the popular It's-It ice cream sandwich, which is a scoop of ice cream sandwiched between two oatmeal cookies and dipped in dark chocolate. The original vanilla It's-It has been available in additional flavors since the 1980s.

== History ==
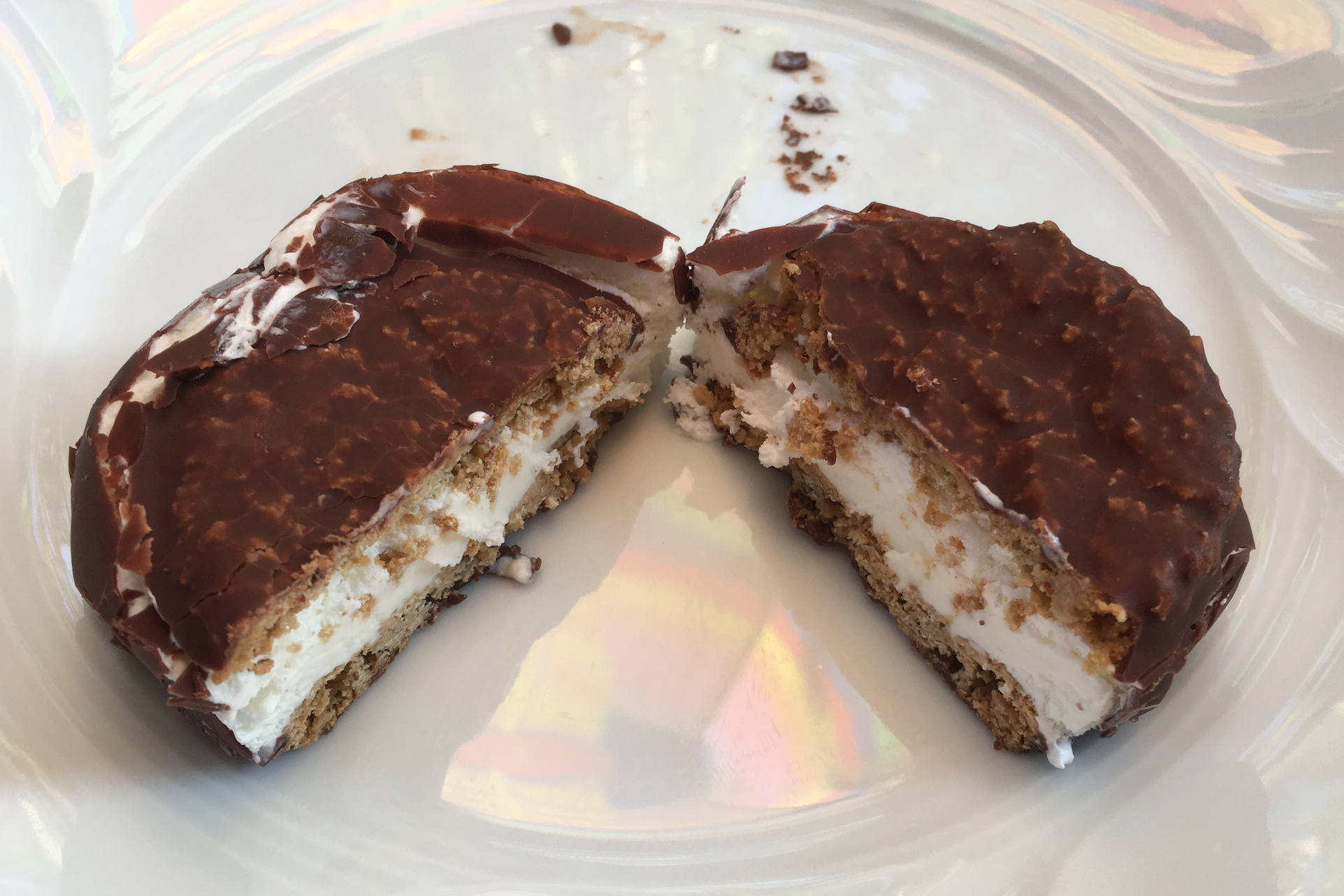
Vanilla It's-It ice cream sandwich

The It's-It was invented in 1928 by George Whitney, one of the original business owners when San Francisco's Playland at the Beach opened across the Great Highway from Ocean Beach on the city's West Side One version of the name's origins is that Whitney was experimenting and cried out "It's-It!" when he hit on the combination of a sandwich of vanilla ice cream inside two oatmeal cookies, covered in chocolate. Another version is that he heard someone answer the question which cow had won a cow race that day (a tradition at Playland); the cow's name was It.

For nearly forty-five years, until Playland was demolished in 1972, the It's-It was available only at Whitney's shop. After Playland closed, the It's-It name was passed to George Mavros, who sold the ice cream sandwiches at another location near Ocean Beach.

In 1974, the Shamieh brothers, and their brothers-in law, A.L. McDow and Isa Zaru, bought the It's-It business. They mechanized production, first at a facility on 11th Street in downtown San Francisco, moving to the current factory in Burlingame in 1976. The company's products are now sold in supermarkets and convenience stores. Chocolate, strawberry, mint and cappuccino flavors were added in the 1980s and green tea in 2016; pumpkin is also available. (The mint, one of the most popular flavors, had bright green filling until 2026, when the company replaced Blue No. 1 dye with spirulina in accordance with FDA guidance to phase out artificial colorings.) The company has also added other ice cream products, including the "Super Sundae", the "Big Daddy", the "Super Cone", and the "Chips It".
