= Fab (brand) =

British frozen dessert brand

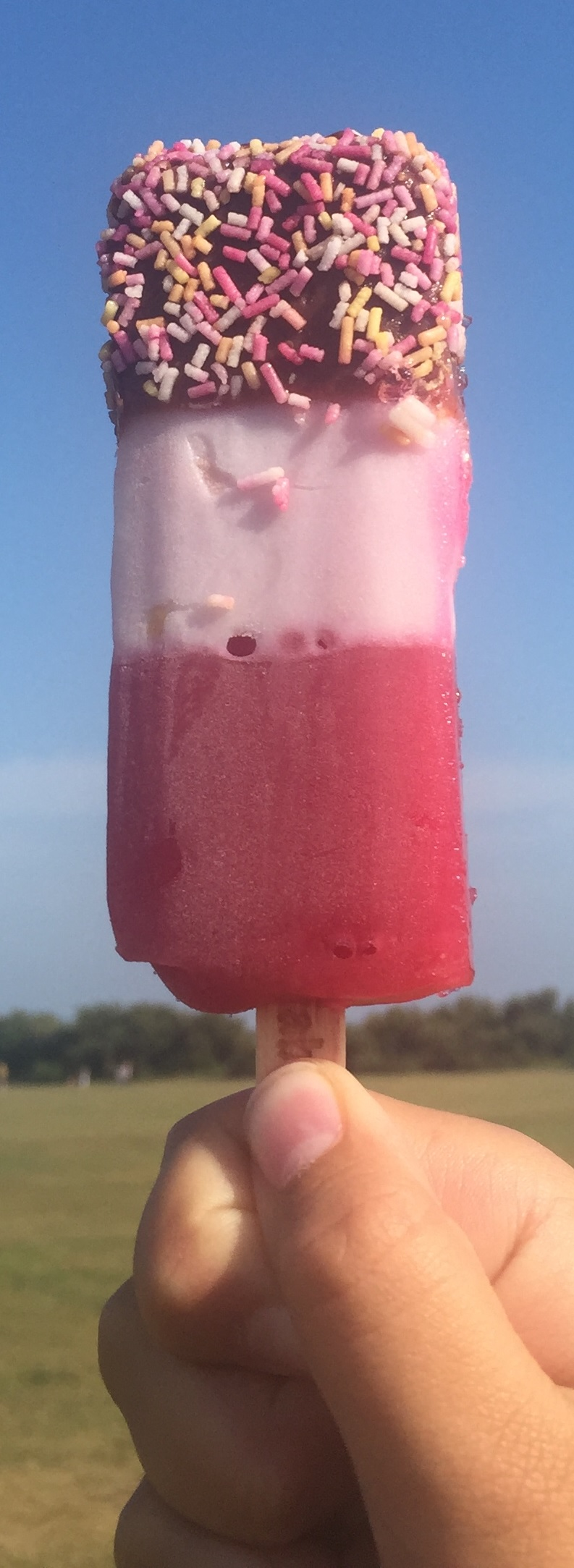
- A modern Fab lolly on its stick
- Product type: Ice lolly
- Current owner: Froneri
- Produced by: Froneri
- Country: United Kingdom
- Introduced: 1967; 59 years ago
- Related brands: Zoom
- Previous owners: J. Lyons and Co. Nestlé Ice Cream; R&R Ice Cream

Fab is a strawberry, vanilla and chocolate flavoured ice lolly made by Froneri. Like its precursor, Zoom, it was introduced by J. Lyons and Co. in the 1960s to capitalise on the popularity of the children's television series of Gerry and Sylvia Anderson, principally Thunderbirds.

== History ==
Zoom was launched first, in April to May 1963, to tie into the Andersons' space series Fireball XL5. Fab followed in May 1967. Zoom was rocket-themed and marketed at boys, leaving a niche for girls. This was filled by the development of Fab: a rounder, more feminine-shaped lolly. To appeal to the female target audience, early branding associated Fab with the Thunderbirds character Lady Penelope, who was featured on the wrapper with her butler Parker. The Thunderbirds characters used the initialism "F-A-B" as an equivalent to "Roger" (communications jargon indicating that a message has been received).

The brand's connection to Thunderbirds has not been maintained, and was quietly dropped in the early 1970s.

In the 1990s, the lolly was produced at a factory in Leeds. In 2013, makers R&R Ice Cream were acquired by PAI Partners and it was announced that production would be moving to Leeming Bar. In 2016, the licence was transferred to Froneri, a PAI–Nestlé joint venture.

In 2017, Fab's logo and packaging were redesigned to coincide with the brand's 50th birthday.

A 2018 YouGov survey found that Fab was the second most popular brand of ice lolly in the UK, tied with Solero.

== Varieties ==
The modern Fab lolly consists of strawberry fruit ice core, coated partly in vanilla ice, with the top dipped in chocolate and coated with hundreds and thousands. The description on the packaging reads "real strawberry and vanilla flavour ice lolly with chocolate flavour coating (5%) and sugar strands (5%)".

A limited-edition orange version has also been produced, as have apple-and-blackcurrant and tropical varieties. In 2017, a new limited edition was produced to celebrate the 50th birthday. This "Birthday Cake" version consisted of raspberry fruit ice, vanilla sponge flavoured ice, and icing with sprinkles on top. 2019 saw the introduction of a "raspberry doughnut" variety containing raspberry ice and a raspberry sauce centre.

== See also ==
- List of frozen dessert brands
- Neapolitan ice cream – traditionally strawberry, vanilla and chocolate
