= Ice cream sandwich =

Frozen dessert typically composed of ice cream between two biscuits

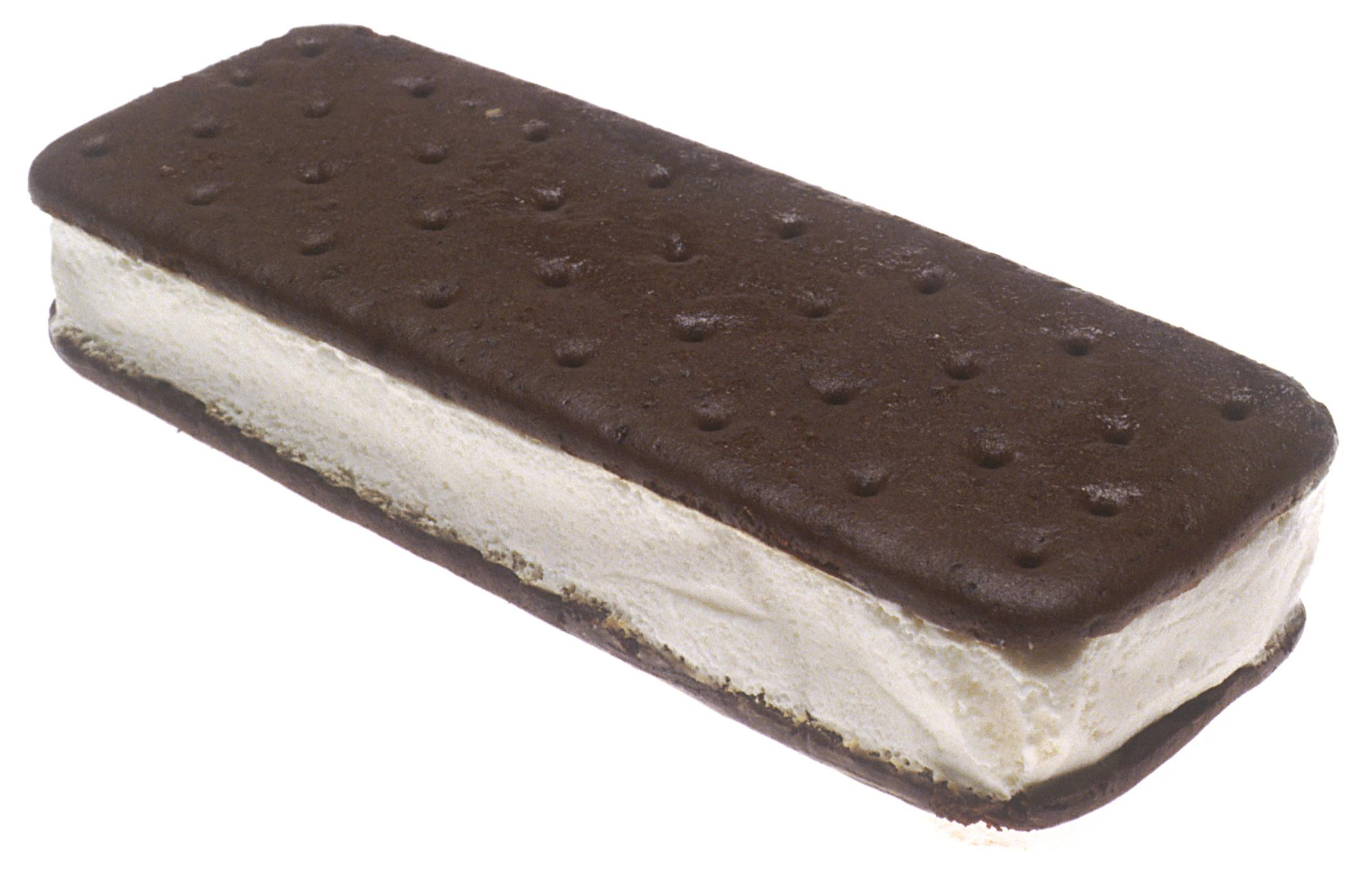
- Type: Ice cream
- Main ingredients: Ice cream and cookies

An ice cream sandwich is a type of ice cream novelty sold and eaten in many countries. An ice cream sandwich consists of ice cream of varying flavors sandwiched between two pieces of a bread-like substance, such as bread, wafers, cookies, etc. Sold in grocery stores, ice cream parlors, and by street vendors, ice cream sandwiches have been utilized for their convenience. The agent acting as bread serves as an edible container for the ice cream -- similar to a cone. Ice cream sandwiches are typically referred to as an ice cream sandwich, although other names also exist, such as hokey pokey, or cream-between.

== History ==
The first known recipe for ice cream sandwich was published in London in 1894. It was made of ice cream layered between two slices of sponge cake.

Ice cream sandwiches had already started being sold by street vendors in New York by 1899, alongside cones and other frozen novelties. Manufacturers capitalized on this creation where a notable recipe for the ice cream sandwich was written in a book published by Charles Herman Senn in 1900 titled Ices, and How to Make Them. Articles began to arise talking about the rising popularity of the ice cream sandwich, such as in 1901 from an issue of the American Kitchen Magazine as well as in 1902 from an article in the New York Tribune. The earliest US patent having to do with ice cream sandwiches (No. 1,387,613) is by Russell H. Proper for an "Ice Cream Sandwich Machine" in 1921.

== Production ==
The production of ice cream sandwiches today typically involves using either a conventional or an "extrude and cut" machine. Traditionally, conventional ice cream sandwich machines squeeze out ice cream and cut off the flow using the edge of the wafer and equipment indexing from a rectangular nozzle and applies two wafer cookies to both sides. These sandwiches will then be wrapped and boxed up. Modern "extrude and cut" machines allow for greater customization concerning the shape and composition of ice cream sandwiches. These machines start by placing a wafer onto a conveyor, where ice cream is then dispensed out of a vertical nozzle and cut by a hot wire onto the wafer. Another wafer is then placed on top of the ice cream, where it is then moved to a hardening tunnel until it is ready to be packaged.

== Regional varieties ==
=== Germany ===
In Germany, ice cream sandwiches are made with two wafers and the three-flavour combination called Fürst-Pückler-Eis, elsewhere known as Neapolitan ice cream. It is based on a recipe introduced in 1839 by Louis Ferdinand Jungiu, the cook of German nobleman Prince Hermann Ludwig Heinrich von Pückler-Muskau.

=== Iran ===
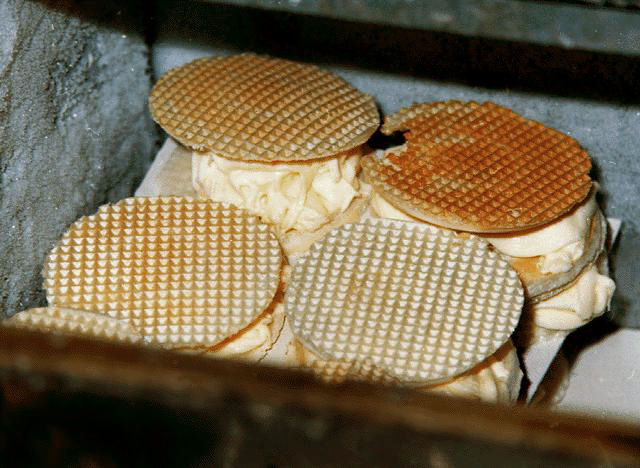
Classic Iranian bread-ice cream

The usual Iranian ice cream sandwich is called Bastani Nooni (بستنی نانی) meaning "bread-ice cream" and is made with Iranian traditional ice cream between two wafers.

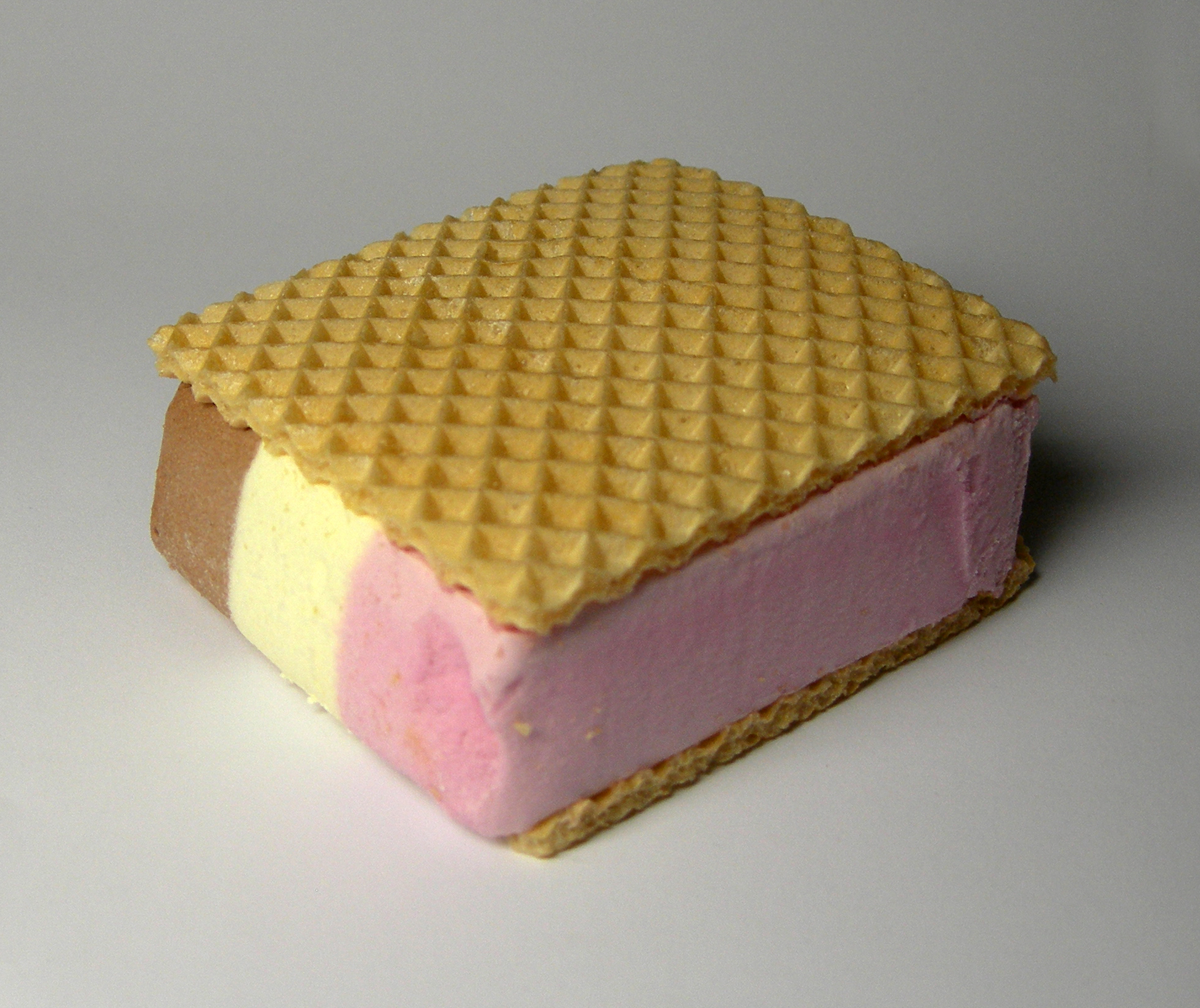
A neapolitan ice cream sandwich prepared with wafers

=== Serbia ===
In Serbia, a popular frozen food company Frikom created Plazma Sandwich, which is a unique fusion of Plazma (a popular Serbian biscuit brand) flavored ice cream, enriched with ground Plazma biscuits, covered in milk chocolate, with a sprinkling of ground Plazma biscuits covering one half, and two larger pieces of Plazma biscuits enveloping the ice cream on the other half.

=== Singapore ===
Wafer ice creams are popular in Singapore. It is one of the types of potong (cut) ice cream, so named because the servings are sliced from a large bar of ice cream. Wafer ice cream sandwiches consist of two wafers holding together a rectangular block of ice cream, as opposed to other bread-like substitutes. Wafer ice cream evolved from the older 'ice potong' type, which is a rectangular prism of ice cream mounted on a wooden stick. Many customers complained that the ice potong would easily melt and fall off the stick, leading to the introduction of the wafers for better grip. Vendors are commonly found along Orchard Road, Chinatown and outside of schools. A colloquial term for the dessert is "pia ice cream", which translates to "biscuit ice cream" in the Hokkien dialect.

Common flavours offered include peppermint, chocolate chip, durian, ripple, red bean, yam, sweet corn, honeydew, and chocolate.

Wafer ice cream vendors also sell the same blocks of ice cream on slices of multicoloured bread, on cones or in cups instead of sandwiched between wafers.

Catering companies in Singapore also send ice cream sandwich carts for functions.

=== United States ===
The earliest mention of ice cream sandwiches in North America occurs in 1899. Street vendors in New York sold slabs of ice cream between sheets of paper, called "hokey pokey", until someone had the idea of using cookies instead. Photos from the Jersey Shore circa 1905 show ice cream sandwiches being sold at 1¢ each.

A "National Ice Cream Sandwich Day" is set for August 2 and has been celebrated since at least 2005.

=== Vietnam ===
In Vietnam, an ice cream sandwich called bánh mì kẹp kem is commonly sold on the street as a snack. It consists of scoops of ice cream stuffed inside a bánh mì, sprinkled with crushed peanuts.

== See also ==
- Sandwich cookie
- It's-It Ice Cream
- List of sandwiches
