= Calippo =

Flavoured ice confection

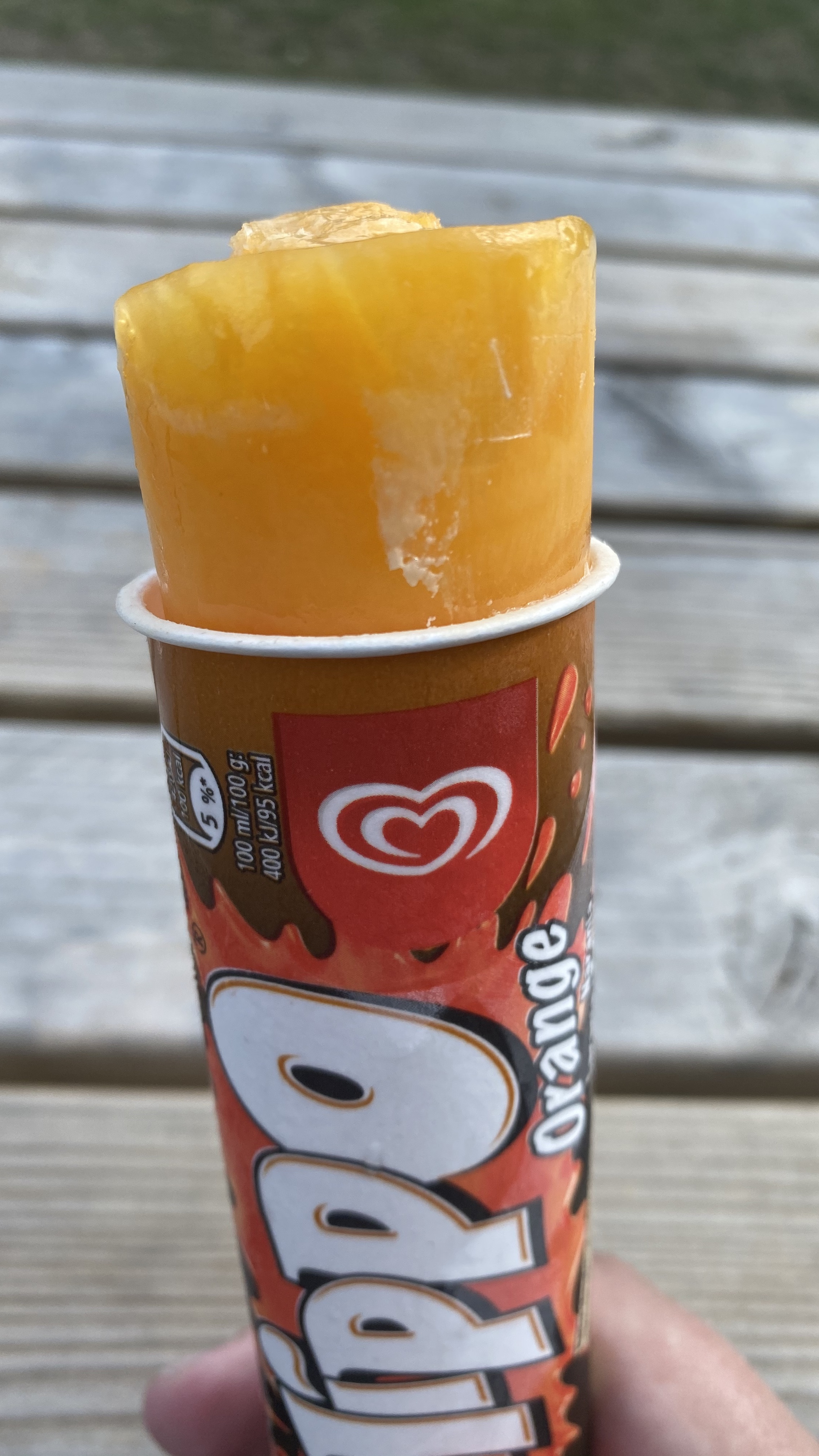
An orange-flavoured Calippo

Calippo is a frozen dessert introduced by Unilever in 1984 to European markets.

The brand is sold by The Magnum Ice Cream Company under the Heartbrand umbrella.

== Products ==
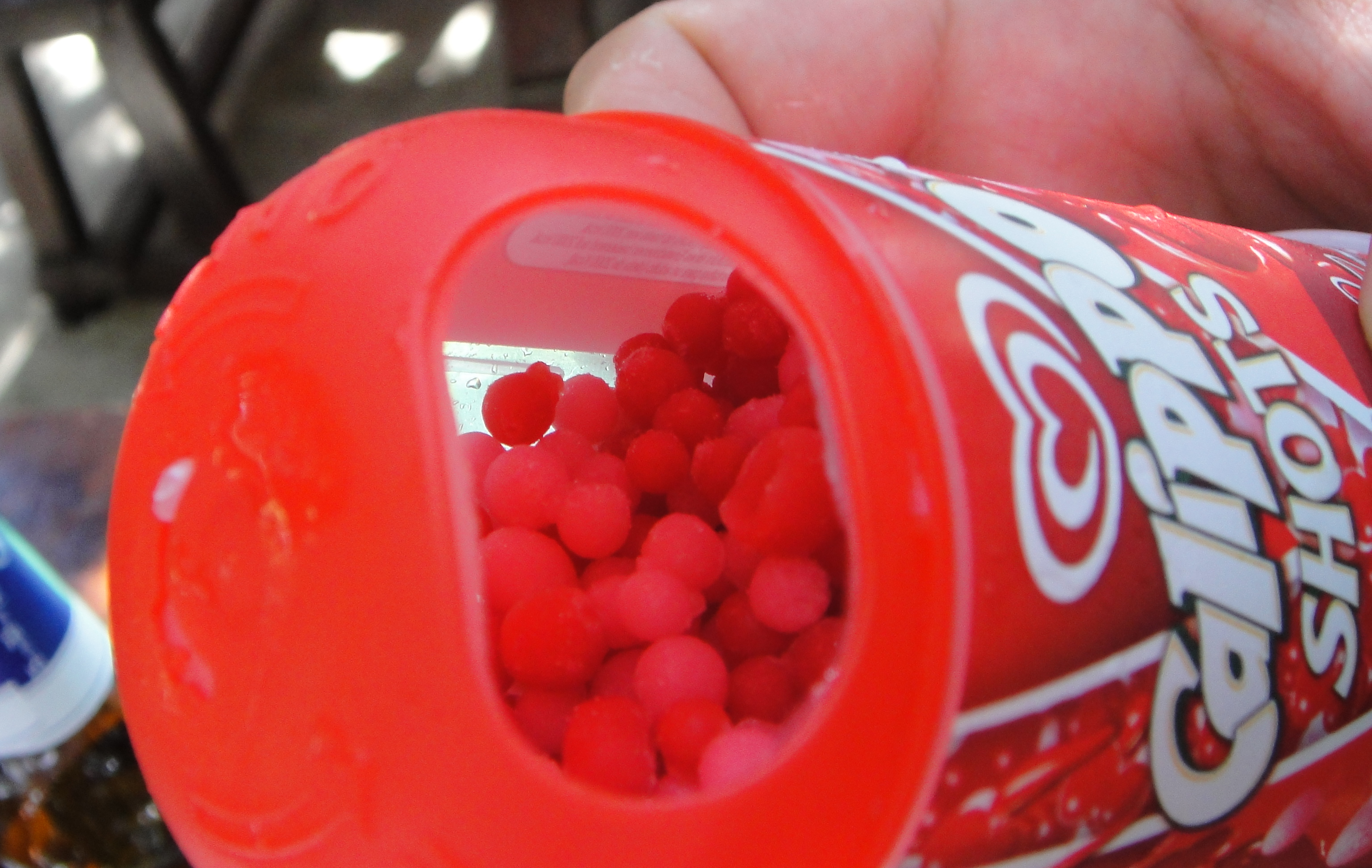
Calippo Shots

Calippo sells the following products and tastes:

- Lemon
- Mango-blueberry
- Raspberry-pineapple
- Tropical
- Lemon Minis
- Lime Minis
- Cola
- Bubblegum
- Raspberry-pineapple minis
- Multipack (x6)
- Strawberry
- Orange
- Lime
- Magic Blue
- Lipton Ice Tea Green
- Lipton Ice Tea Peach
- Calippo Burst Frozen Drinks
- Calippo Slush Frozen Drinks
- Calippo Shots (discontinued but recontinued in some countries)

== Similar products ==
=== UK ===
Fruit Shoot Squeeze Ice Lollies are a similar product originally made by Frederick's Dairies / R&R Until 2016 for Robinsons. Flavours are Orange, and Blackcurrant. Now Made for Rose Confectionary in Latvia under Licence from Britvic and in a plastic packet. 2 new flavours were added are Apple and Summer Fruits.

Rowntree's Push Up Ice Lollies (originally Rowntree Fruit Pastilles Push Up Ice Lollies) are a similar product made by Nestlé under the Rowntree's brand. Flavours are currently Orange, Blackcurrant, Strawberry and Tropical.

Pip Organic Ice Squeezers are a similar product made by Pip Organic. Flavours are Tropical Fruity, and Berry Fruity.

Marshfield farms Produce a similar Multi award winning product called Push-Up Pops. Flavours are Orange, Blackcurrant, and Vanilla Milkshake.

Most supermarkets in the United Kingdom, such as Morrisons, have a house-brand version of the Calippo.
