= Swensen =

Swensen may refer to:

- Swensen's, global chain of ice cream restaurants

== People ==
- Cole Swensen (born 1955), American poet
- David F. Swensen (1956–2021), American businessman, Chief Investment Officer at Yale University
- Earle Swensen (died 1996), American businessman
- Glen W. Swensen (1910-2000), American lawyer, judge, and politician
- Joseph Swensen (born 1960), American conductor, violinist, and composer
- Jenny Swensen, fictional paranormal in the Marvel Comics imprint New Universe

== See also ==
- Svensen (disambiguation)
