= CoolBrands =

CoolBrands may refer to:

- CoolBrands International, a former Canadian frozen foods and desserts manufacturer.
- Swisher Hygiene, a sanitation company which is using the former CoolBrands International public stock listing through a reverse takeover.
