= Arthur Falcone =

American businessperson

- Occupations: Founder and CEO
- Employer: Falcone Group
- Known for: Real Estate Development
- Website: http://falconegroup.info/

Arthur Falcone is an American real estate developer and chief executive officer and chairman of Falcone Group, a real estate and land development organization located in Boca Raton, Florida. He is known for commercial, residential and mixed-use projects and for his philanthropy to aspiring entrepreneurs.

== Early life ==
Arthur Falcone was born and raised in Elmont, New York, to first-generation Italian immigrants. His father was a police officer. Falcone attended Nassau Community College, leaving to join McDonald's as a management trainee.

== Early career ==
Arthur Falcone invested in fast food restaurants, hotels and health clubs in New York, along with his brother, Edward Falcone. At age 22, Arthur Falcone became McDonald's youngest franchisee. He and his brother became the owner-operator of McDonald's, Wendy's, Days Inn Hotels and other family-style restaurants throughout New York, Florida and California.

In 1988, Art Falcone and Philip Cucci Jr. formed Transeastern Properties, Inc., a builder-developer for Westinghouse Communities and shortly thereafter also for Arvida Communities. The company built single family homes in the cities of Coral Springs, Florida, Parkland, Florida and Weston, Florida. By 2005, it had become the largest private homebuilder in Florida and one of the top 50 homebuilders in the United States. In 2005, the homebuilding assets and operations of Transeastern were sold to Technical Olympic USA (TOUSA) for approximately $857 million. In a related transaction, TOUSA paid $750 million for land banks that Transeastern owned.

== Encore Capital Management ==
Art Falcone and Anthony Avila started Encore Real Estate Funds in 2008–2009. Avila was a principal at JMP Securities who ran the investment banking platform for real estate. Since 1999, he was also the investment banker for Transeastern Properties, where he had worked on the sale of the Transeastern in 2005. Shortly thereafter, William Powers, a senior executive with PIMCO, joined Encore Capital Management.

Encore Capital Management is a diversified, multiple fund, real estate investment and development firm.

Encore operates two funds, Encore Housing Opportunity Fund I and Encore Housing Opportunity Fund II, and one private REIT, called Rescore. Encore is developing over 20,000 rental apartments, homes for sale, and residential lots with sell out revenue of approximately $4 billion. Encore assets under management are approximately $2 billion with investments in Miami, Orlando, Jacksonville, Tampa, Los Angeles, San Diego, Sacramento, San Francisco, Dallas, Austin, and Phoenix.

== Real Estate Developments ==
=== Plantation Walk ===
The company purchased the bankrupt Plantation Fashion Mall in Plantation for $37.7 million in 2015. It re-branded the 32-acre project as Plantation Walk in 2017, which will be a mixed-use development comprising office space, luxury apartment rentals, retail, restaurants and hotels. The first phase officially opened in June 2019 with a 172,959-square-foot Class-A office building partially leased by Aetna. That month, the company secured a $121.3 million loan to build 134,326 square feet of retail and 404 apartments. In November 2019, the developers proposed a new site plan for the second phase that included an office building, senior living facility, supermarket and hotel.

=== Margaritaville Resort Orlando ===
Falcone Group opened a 184-room hotel on the 320-acre multi-use property in January 2019. A water park named Island H2O Live! followed in June with eight slides, a lazy river and adults-only area. The development includes Sunset Walk at Margaritaville Resort Orlando, a retail development of over 200,000 square feet, and Margaritaville Cottages Orlando, which consists of timeshare-vacation homes whose sales opened in December 2018. Nearby, Falcone Group is developing Encore Club at Reunion, which consists of vacation rental homes and apartments.

=== Miami Worldcenter ===
Miami Worldcenter Associates, led by principals Art Falcone and Nitin Motwani, serves as the master developer for the mixed-use Miami Worldcenter project, a 15 million square foot, mixed-use, master-planned urban development comprising 27 acres in Miami, Florida. The project is the second largest development in the U.S., just behind the 28-acre Hudson Yards, Manhattan project in New York in the United States. The project has attracted over $1 billion in investments to Miami.

Miami Worldcenter Associates obtained the Miami City Commission's approval of the zoning package and master development agreement for the project in 2014. Construction of the $2 billion-plus project began in late 2014. As of January 2020, all but 2 acres had site plans and development partners.

The Caoba apartments with 444 units, opened in March 2019 with 84% of the units leased. A second phase is planned.

The 60-story Paramount Miami Worldcenter with 569 condominiums was completed in July 2019 with 90% of units sold at that time. A total of 150,000 square feet of retail was completed in 2019 with another 50,000 square feet under construction. Miami Worldcenter Associates, Forbes Co. and Taubman Centers collaborated on leasing with plans to open stores in 2021.

A Marriott Marquis hotel with 1,700 rooms and a 600,000-square-foot convention space is planned. The project was envisioned in 2014 as part of a convention center. Two years later the project became a two-story complex, and in 2017, Marriott signed a franchise agreement for the property. Hotelier citizenM started construction on its 12-story, 351-room hotel in November 2019 with an opening planned in 2021. A Legacy Hotel & Residences is also planned. The developer also has plans for a public park with a three-story, 100,000-square-foot building.

=== Other developments ===
Encore Capital Development secured a $75 million loan from Pacific Western Bank and Square Mile Capital in 2017 to build The Rise Flagler Village in Fort Lauderdale near the Brightline/Virgin Capital rail station. The 30-story building was proposed with 348 units. The developer broke ground in March 2018 on the project, which will be part of Encore's multifamily brand called "The Rise". Occupancy is expected in 2020.

Encore and Twin Creek partnered on mixed-use development, Beachwalk, near Jacksonville, Florida. The project's 14-acre lagoon, the largest in the country, was completed in February 2018. Plans for the mixed-use project on 1,200 acres include 2,800 single-family homes, 348 apartments, offices and a retail center.

== Awards ==
In 1994, Falcone received the American Heritage Award from the Anti-Defamation League. In 2006, he was inducted into the H. Wayne Huizenga School of Business Entrepreneurship Hall of Fame at Nova Southeastern University. In 2007, Falcone was inducted into the Junior Achievement Hall of Fame. He has been named a South Florida Power Leader by the South Florida Business Journal more than five times.

In 2014, he received the Developer of the Year award from the Miami chapter of the American Institute of Architects for his work as managing principal of Miami Worldcenter Associates. In 2019, he was named to the inaugural Florida 500 list published by Florida Trend magazine. The same year, he made the 2019 Haute List of the biggest names in Miami, according to the magazine. Falcone received the 2020 Horatio Alger Award from the Horatio Alger Association of Distinguished Americans and was inducted into the association in April of that year.

In 2022, Falcone was among the recipients of the Ultimate CEO Award from the South Florida Business Journal. Two years later, Falcone and his wife Marcy were inducted into the Hall of Fame of the Broward County chapter of the Boys & Girls Clubs of America at a January program. In 2025, Falcone and Marcy also received the Huizenga Lifetime Legacy Award at Junior Achievement of South Florida's 2025 Business Hall of Fame ceremony.

== Board Memberships ==
Falcone has been serving on the board of trustees for Nova Southeastern University since 2006. He founded JA Biz Town, a nonprofit affiliated with Junior Achievement USA to teach students in grades 4-6 entrepreneurship, financial literacy and work-readiness skills. The program combines classroom learning with a simulation in which the students manage businesses and engage in civic involvement.

Falcone and his wife, Marcy, sit on the boards of Crohn's and Colitis Foundation of America and SOS Children's Villages. They funded a $2 million renovation 12 homes and converting an office for a 13th home for foster children at the community in Coconut Creek.

== Personal life ==
Arthur Falcone and his wife, Marcy, have three sons, Nicholas, Daniel and Matthew.
