= Wayne Huizenga =

American businessman (1937–2018)

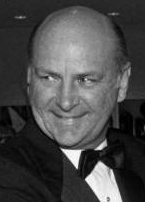
- Huizenga in the 1980s
- Born: Harry Wayne Huizenga; December 29, 1937; Evergreen Park, Illinois, U.S.
- Died: March 22, 2018 (aged 80); Fort Lauderdale, Florida, U.S.
- Resting place: Evergreen Cemetery, Fort Lauderdale, Florida, U.S.
- Education: Calvin College
- Occupations: Businessman; entrepreneur
- Known for: Ownership of: Blockbuster Video; Waste Management, Inc.; AutoNation; Swisher Hygiene; Miami Dolphins; Florida Panthers; Florida Marlins
- Spouses: Joyce VanderWagen (m. 1960; div. 1966); Martha Jean "Marti" Goldsby (m. 1972; died 2017)

Harry Wayne Huizenga Sr. (/haɪˈzɛŋɡə/; December 29, 1937 – March 22, 2018) was an American businessman. He founded AutoNation and Waste Management, Inc., and was the owner or co-owner of Blockbuster Video, Republic Services, the Miami Dolphins of the National Football League (NFL), the Florida Panthers of the National Hockey League (NHL), and the Miami Marlins (formerly Florida Marlins) of Major League Baseball (MLB).

== Early life and education ==
Harry Wayne Huizenga was of Dutch descent. His grandfather, Harm Huizenga, came to the United States from the Netherlands. Starting with a horse and wagon, Harm Huizenga built a trash hauling service, Huizenga & Sons Scavenger Co. in suburban Chicago in 1894. Wayne Huizenga's parents, Gerrit Harry Huizenga and Jean Huizenga (née Riddering), a home decorator, grew up in the Dutch community in Chicago and were strict members of the Dutch Reformed Church.

Huizenga was born at Little Company of Mary Hospital, in Evergreen Park, Illinois, on December 29, 1937, the first child in a family of garbage haulers. In 1940 when Wayne was two, the Huizenga family were listed as living in an apartment building in Berwyn, Illinois. He had one sister, Bonnie, who was five years younger. He attended Chicago Christian High School in his sophomore year. In 1953, the Huizenga family moved to the Fort Lauderdale, Florida area. His father became a building contractor.

The remainder of Huizenga's high school years were spent at Pine Crest School, where he was a member of the football team and senior class treasurer, graduating in 1955. In 1956, he moved back to Chicago where most of his friends, grandparents and other relatives lived, and enrolled at Calvin College, a liberal arts college in Grand Rapids, Michigan, but he dropped out after three semesters, before finishing his sophomore year. For approximately five years after graduation, he took on low-wage jobs and in September 1959 enlisted in the United States Army Reserve and spent six months on active duty.

== Career ==
In Fort Lauderdale, Huizenga started a waste management business, as his grandfather had done in Chicago in 1894.

According to a civil suit filed in November 1961 by Thomas Millwood, a self-employed electrical engineer who refused young Huizenga's offer to haul the trash with his Pompano Carting venture, and "after using abusive and profane language to both Millwood and his wife, the defendant Huizenga attacked Millwood in a fit of anger and without provocation ... striking him on his face and body, using great force and violence, thereby inflicting great bodily harm and mental shock." The altercation left Millwood with a "ripped shirt, broken sunglasses, and abrasions" on his face. Most painful, noted the lawsuit, was the "permanent injury to the testicles and genital area as a result of grabbing and twisting by the defendant." The matter went to trial, where the jury awarded Millwood $1,000 in damages.

In 1962, he started the Southern Sanitation Service by borrowing US$5,000 from his father and convincing a rival trash hauler to sell him used trucks. Beginning with one garbage truck in 1968, he created Waste Management, Inc. Huizenga purchased many independent garbage hauling companies; by the time of the initial public offering of the company in 1972, he had acquired 133 small-time haulers.

In 1984, he left Waste Management, Inc. and soon again bought companies including suppliers of portable toilets and water bottles for home coolers.

Huizenga repeated the process with Blockbuster Video, acquiring a handful of stores in 1987, with the company becoming the leading movie-rental chain in the United States by 1994.

In December 1992, Huizenga became a member of the Non-Group (a civically influential group of Miami-Dade business elites).

In 1995, Huizenga invested $64 million of his own money and raised an additional $168 million to acquire Republic Industries and became its chairman; it completed the corporate spin-off of Republic Services in 1998 and was renamed AutoNation, which became the nation's largest automotive dealer.

In October 2004, he sold Boca Resorts, owner of hotels including The Hyatt Pier 66 Hotel and the Radisson Bahia Mar Hotel & Marina in Fort Lauderdale, The Boca Raton Resort & Club in Boca Raton, Florida, and several others in Naples, Florida, and Arizona, to The Blackstone Group for $1 billion; Huizenga netted $192 million from the deal.

In 2010, Huizenga along with Steve Berrard, former CEO of Blockbuster Video and AutoNation, took a majority stake in Swisher Hygiene, after paying $8.1 million to founder Patrick Swisher and his wife, Laura. The company became a public company but did not do well and was acquired by Ecolab.

=== Sports team ownership ===
Huizenga was notable for introducing baseball and ice hockey to the South Florida area as the creator and initial owner of the Florida Marlins and Florida Panthers. Also, he bought the cable television channel SportsChannel Florida (now Bally Sports Florida) in 1996 to air his teams' games in the region.

He was criticized for naming the two teams for the state of Florida rather than the city of Miami. As an advocate for the city of Fort Lauderdale, he explained that his goal was to include Broward County and Palm Beach County in his teams' fan base.

==== American football ====
In 1990, during a period of financial hardship for the franchise, Huizenga purchased 15% of the National Football League's Miami Dolphins and its stadium in Miami Gardens, Florida. Founding owner Joe Robbie had recently died, and his surviving family found it difficult to keep the team afloat. In turn, Huizenga bought the remaining shares of the team for $115 million to obtain full ownership in 1994. He sold the naming rights of Joe Robbie Stadium (now Hard Rock Stadium) to Fruit of the Loom brand Pro Player for $2 million per year for 10 years.

In February 2008, Huizenga sold 50% of the team and 50% of the stadium for $550 million to Stephen M. Ross, chairman of The Related Companies. Huizenga remained the managing general partner of the franchise until January 2009, when he sold another 45% of the team and as much of the stadium to Ross. Thus, Ross became managing general partner with 95% ownership of the Dolphins and the stadium, and Huizenga retained a 5% share of both club and stadium. Huizenga remained the proprietor of 50% of the land.

In the early 1990s, Huizenga served a two-year probationary period with the National Football League as an owner, with the stipulation that he not buy another team.

==== Baseball ====
In the 1996 off-season, and only three years after the Marlins' first game, Huizenga and General Manager Dave Dombrowski spent more than $89 million on free agents, the amount surprising the rest of the league. The Marlins strengthened their pitching staff by luring Alex Fernandez to Miami and brought over third baseman Bobby Bonilla, outfielder Moisés Alou, reliever Dennis Cook and outfielders John Cangelosi and Jim Eisenreich. In 1997, the team finished with 92 wins—marking the franchise's first winning season, and made the postseason for the first time as the National League Wildcard team. The Marlins went on to win the 1997 World Series, defeating the Cleveland Indians in seven games, becoming the first Wildcard team to win a World Championship.

In the next off season, Huizenga, claiming a financial loss of about $34 million running the team that year, a claim subsequently disputed by Smith College economist Andrew Zimbalist in an essay, ordered the $54 million team payroll to be cut and immediately dismantled the championship team. In November 1998, a year after winning the World Series, the Marlins were sold for a reported amount of approximately $150 million to John W. Henry.

In 2009, Huizenga expressed regret over dismantling the team to save money; the dismantling of the team was listed as "one of the worst moves in the franchise's history" in a 2012 article in Bleacher Report. However, Jonah Keri argued in Baseball Prospectus that by both winning the sport's ultimate trophy and selling the club immediately after that win for a substantial profit, Wayne Huizenga proved to be a "genius."

When he sold the Marlins, Huizenga, who still owned then-Pro Player Stadium, retained the rights to skybox tickets and club seat customers, as well as 62.5% of parking revenue, and 30% of concessions. Economist Andrew Zimbalist commented: "Huizenga made a killing when he sold the team for $150 million [in 1998] and had the lease for this stadium that enabled him to keep just about all the stadium revenue."

==== Ice hockey ====
Huizenga operated the Florida Panthers as a public holding company, buying numerous real estate properties in the name of his Panthers Holding Group. Capitalizing on the team's 1996 drive to the Stanley Cup finals, he sold shares to the public, whose enthusiasm for the club drove civic leaders in Broward County to use public money to build a new arena for the team. Huizenga used the hockey team's stock as currency to begin building yet another diversified enterprise, buying two resort hotels owned partly by Huizenga and other Panthers officials. His original investment in the Panthers had nearly tripled in total value to $150 million.

In June 2001, he sold the Panthers to pharmaceutical businessman and friend Alan Cohen and Cohen's partner, former NFL quarterback Bernie Kosar, for approximately $100 million. In December 2017, 25 years after he created the club, the Panthers retired the no. 37 shirt in honor of Huizenga. His family chose the number because it was his "birth year and lucky number."

=== Proposed Blockbuster Park project ===
In the early 1990s, Huizenga proposed developing 2,500 acres (1,000 ha) of land along Interstate 75 near Miami in Broward County (on the county line between Broward and Dade County) into a complex dubbed "Blockbuster Park". The project would have been developed by Blockbuster Entertainment, and was cancelled after its acquisition by Viacom. Before the project's cancellation, a special tax district had been created by the state government for the project.

The project would have developed an entertainment and sports complex including a theme park, a 45,000-seat domed baseball stadium for the Marlins, a 20,000-seat ice hockey arena for the Panthers, production studios (for film, television, radio, and music), an open-air marine stadium, dinner theaters, cinemas, retail, dining, a virtual reality amusement center, golf facilities, tennis facilities, a roller-skating facilities, youth sports facilities, and youth sports; and office buildings. The project was planned to be the largest tourist attraction developed in Florida since Disney World. Opponents to the project raised concerns of traffic, noise pollution, and environmental pollution that might threaten the adjacent Everglades.

== Honors ==
In 1991, Huizenga received the Golden Plate Award of the American Academy of Achievement.

In 1992, he was named a "Distinguished American" by the Horatio Alger Association of Distinguished Americans. He was named its 2008 Norman Vincent Peale Award recipient.

He was named the 2005 Ernst & Young World Entrepreneur Of The Year.

In 2012, the City of Fort Lauderdale, Florida, renamed Southeast 9th Street in the Rio Vista neighborhood Wayne Huizenga Blvd.

== Personal life and death ==
On September 10, 1960, he married Joyce Vander Wagen, whom he met while in high school. He had known Joyce since his early school years in Evergreen Park. Wayne and Joyce had two children, Wayne Jr. and Scott. The marriage ended in divorce in 1966.

Huizenga married his second wife, Martha Jean "Marti" (née Pike) Goldsby, a native of San Antonio, Florida, in April 1972. She was a secretary, and had done billing and clerical work in one of his businesses. He later adopted her son, Robert Ray, and daughter Pamela. The couple remained married until her death on January 3, 2017, following a fourteen-year battle with cancer.

In May 2004, Huizenga purchased a private luxury yacht from Australian professional golfer Greg Norman. The yacht cost $77 million and was further modified by Huizenga to feature a helipad for a 12-seat helicopter. In August 2004, Power & Motoryacht ranked it the 43rd-longest yacht in the world.

In 1999, Huizenga donated $4 million to Nova Southeastern University in Fort Lauderdale, Florida, which named the H. Wayne Huizenga School of Business and Entrepreneurship after him. In 1996, he donated $1 million to Pine Crest School, his alma mater, which named its science building the Huizenga Science Building.

In 2009, his Huizenga Family Foundation donated the chapel at the South Florida Council's Scout camp in Davie, Florida.

In the 1980s, he began acquiring 2,000 acres about 30 miles north of West Palm Beach. In 1996, he based the Floridian Golf & Yacht Club there, an exclusive golf club "with enough estate homes on the property to cover his costs," and a course designed by Gary Player where he extended free privileges to some two hundred "friends, relatives, and business associates," including actors Michael Douglas and Catherine Zeta-Jones and retired GE Chairman Jack Welch. He renamed his yacht Floridian, before selling the Floridian club and estate to Texas entrepreneur Jim Crane in 2010.

Huizenga died aged 80 of an undisclosed cancer at his home in Fort Lauderdale, Florida, on the night of March 22, 2018.

Sporting positions
New creation	Florida Panthers owner 1993–2001	Succeeded by Alan Cohen
New creation	Miami Marlins owner 1993–1998	Succeeded by John W. Henry
Preceded by Joe Robbie	Miami Dolphins owner 1990–2009	Succeeded by Stephen M. Ross
