= Huizenga =

Huizenga is a surname of Dutch origin. Notable people with the surname include:

- Jenning Huizenga (born 1984), Dutch professional racing-cyclist
- John R. Huizenga (1921–2014), American nuclear physical chemist
- Kevin Huizenga (born 1977), American cartoonist
- Mark Huizenga, American politician
- Robert Huizenga, American physician
- Wayne Huizenga (1937–2018), American businessman
- William Patrick "Bill" Huizenga (born 1969), American politician

== See also ==
- Huizinga (name)
- H. Wayne Huizenga School of Business and Entrepreneurship
