= Jamaica–United States relations =

- Jamaica: United States

Jamaica and the United States maintain productive diplomatic relations.

== History ==
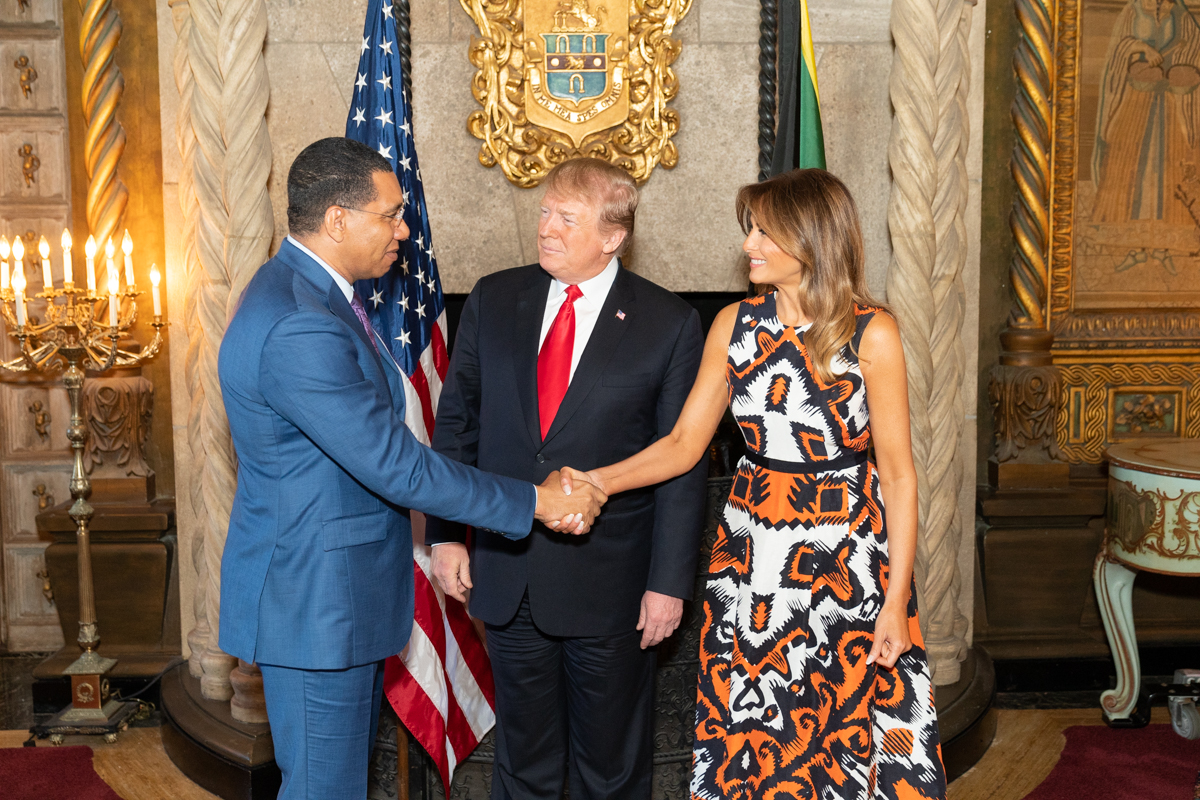
U.S. President Donald Trump and First Lady Melania Trump meet with Jamaican Prime Minister Andrew Holness in Palm Beach, Florida in March 2019

England established a sugar colony in 1655 following the successful invasion of Jamaica during the Anglo-Spanish War. Spain acknowledged English possession of Jamaica in the 1670 Treaty of Madrid led by Robert Venables after it was made an ambitious plan by Oliver Cromwell to acquire new colonies in the West Indies. In 1662, there were about 400 African slaves on the island. As the cultivation of sugar cane was introduced, the number of slaves grew to 9,504 by 1673. The landowners acquired more slaves to work on the estates, and in 1734 there were 86,546 slaves imported from Africa to the Americas. Enslaved people from Jamaica arrived in the Thirteen Colonies, as Massachusetts was the first English colony to legally recognize slavery in 1641. In 1662, Virginia passed a law that the children of enslaved women took the status of the mother, rather than that of the father, as under common law. This legal principle was called partus sequitur ventrum. During the 1770s, Africans from Jamaica, both enslaved and free, participated on both sides of the American Revolutionary War.

Most slaves were loyal to Britain after the war. The eruption of the French Revolution inspired the August 1791 Haitian Revolution on the former French colony of Saint-Domingue, where Jamaican voodoo priest Dutty Boukman from Bois Caïman served as a key leader of the slave revolt in the Cap-Haïtien region of the north of the island. Following the capture of Louverture in 1802 and his death at Fort de Joux in 1803, his successor Jean-Jacques Dessalines defeated the French army of Napoleon Bonaparte to its withdrawal after the Battle of Vertières. On 1 January 1804, Saint-Domingue proclaimed its independence and renamed the island nation Ayiti, meaning Land of Mountains. Haiti became the world's first black-led republic in the New World and the second independent nation after the United States.

In 1807, following the abolition of the Atlantic slave trade, the British in Jamaica agreed to abolish slavery on behalf of the government of Prime Minister Charles Grey after the death of William Wilberforce in 1833 that ended the nightmare of all slaves with full freedom that was granted in Jamaica on 1 August 1838. On 6 August 1962, Jamaica gained independence from the United Kingdom where both the Queen Elizabeth II and King Charles III have become both Jamaican Monarchs. The United States recognized Jamaica's independence on 16 August 1962 with the establishment of U.S. Embassy in Kingston.

Former Prime Minister Patterson visited Washington, DC, several times after assuming office in 1992. In April 2001, Prime Minister Patterson and other Caribbean leaders met with President George W. Bush during the Summit of the Americas in Quebec, Canada, at which a "Third Border Initiative" was launched to deepen U.S. cooperation with Caribbean nations and enhance economic development and integration of the Caribbean nations. Portia Simpson Miller attended the "Conference on the Caribbean--A 20/20 Vision" in Washington in June 2007.

The United States is Jamaica's most important trading partner; the bilateral trade in goods in 2005 was over $2 billion. Jamaica is a popular destination for American tourists; more than 1.2 million Americans visited in 2006. In addition, some 10,000 American citizens, including many dual-nationals born on the island, permanently reside in Jamaica.

The Government of Jamaica also seeks to attract U.S. investment and supports efforts to create a Free Trade Area of the Americas (FTAA). More than 80 U.S. firms have operations in Jamaica, and total U.S. investment is estimated at more than $3 billion. An office of the U.S. and Foreign Commercial Service, located in the embassy, actively assists American businesses seeking trade opportunities in Jamaica. The country is a beneficiary of the Caribbean Basin Trade Partnership Act (CBTPA). The United States Chamber of Commerce, which is also available to assist U.S. business in Jamaica, has offices in Kingston. U.S. Agency for International Development (USAID) assistance to Jamaica since its independence in 1962 has contributed to reducing the population growth rate, the attainment of higher standards in a number of critical health indicators, and the diversification and expansion of Jamaica's export base. USAID's primary objective is promoting sustainable economic growth. Other key objectives are improved environmental quality and natural resource protection, strengthening democratic institutions and respect for the rule of law, as well as family planning. In fiscal year 2006, the USAID mission in Jamaica operated a program totaling more than $21 million in development assistance.

The Peace Corps has been in Jamaica continuously since 1962. Since then, more than 3,300 volunteers have served in the country. Today, the Peace Corps works in the following projects: Youth-at-Risk, which includes adolescent reproductive health, HIV/AIDS education, and the needs of marginalized males; water sanitation, which includes rural waste water solutions and municipal waste water treatment; and environmental education, which helps address low levels of awareness and strengthens environmental nongovernmental organizations. The Peace Corps in Jamaica fields about 70 volunteers who work in every parish on the island, including some inner-city communities in Kingston.

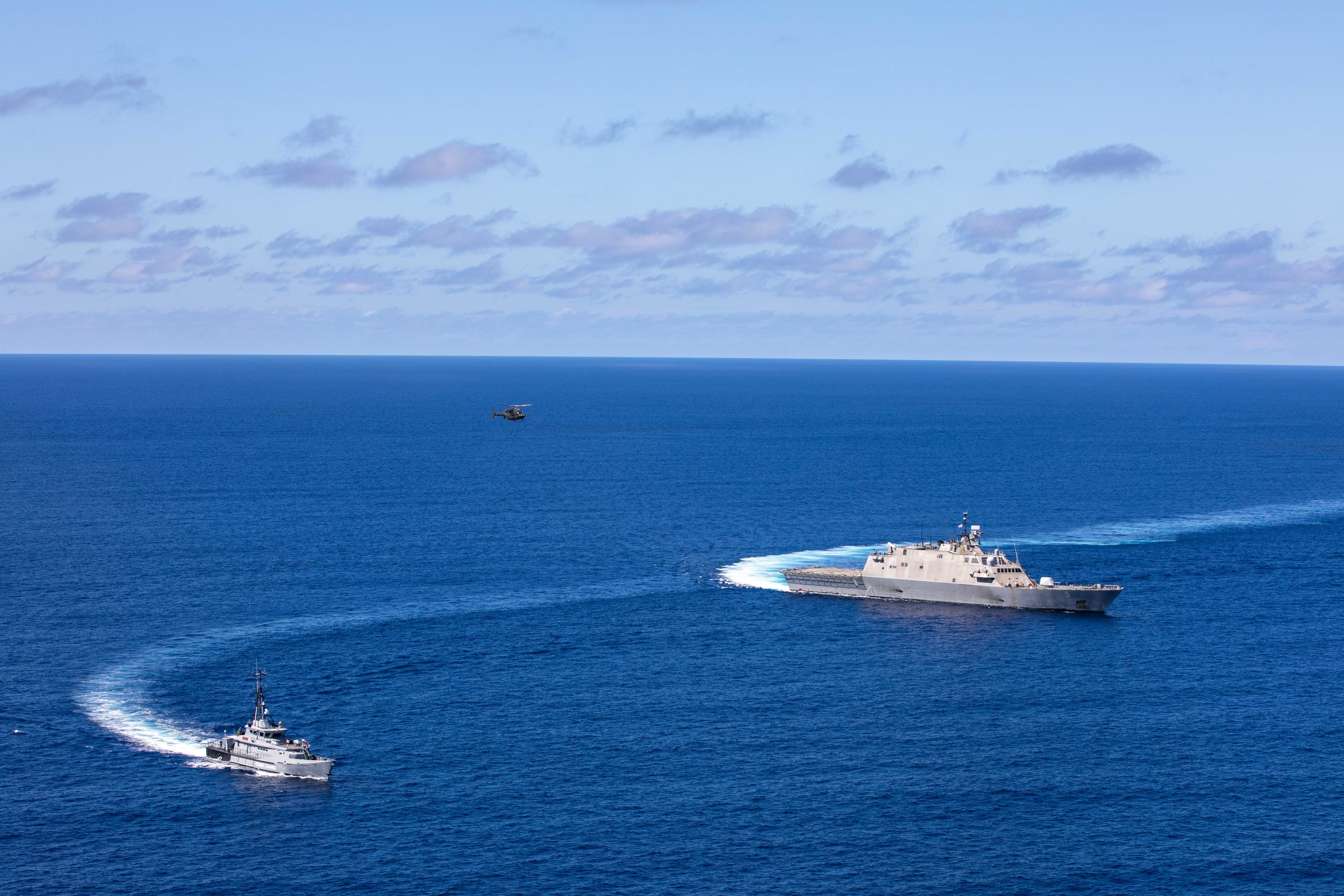
The USS Milwaukee (LCS-5) (right) with Jamaican Coast Guard ship HMJS Alexander Bustamante (left) conduct joint exercises supporting counter-illicit drug trafficking operations in 2022

Jamaica is a major transit point for cocaine en route to the United States and is also a key source of marijuana and marijuana derivative products for the Americas. During 2006, the Government of Jamaica seized narcotics destined for the United States, arrested key traffickers and criminal gang leaders, and dismantled their organizations. Jamaica remains the Caribbean's largest producer and exporter of marijuana. The efforts of the Jamaica Constabulary Force (JCF) and Jamaica Defense Force (JDF) enabled cannabis seizures to increase by over 200% in 2006. In 2006, the JCF arrested 5,409 persons on drug related charges, including 269 foreigners. Additionally, more than 20,000 kilograms of marijuana were seized, and 6,300,000 marijuana plants eradicated in 2006. Operation Kingfish is a multinational task force (Jamaica, U.S., United Kingdom, and Canada) for coordinating investigations leading to the arrest of major criminals. From its October 2004 inception through December 2006, Operation Kingfish launched 1,378 operations resulting in the seizure of 56 vehicles, 57 boats, one aircraft, 206 firearms, and two containers conveying drugs. Kingfish was also responsible for the seizure of over 13 metric tons of cocaine (mostly outside of Jamaica) and over 27,390 pounds of compressed marijuana. In 2006 Operation Kingfish mounted 870 operations, compared to 607 in 2005. In 2006, through cargo scanning, the Jamaican Customs Contraband Enforcement Team seized over 3,000 pounds of marijuana, ten kilograms of cocaine, and approximately $500,000 at Jamaican air and seaports.

== Embassies ==
Principal Jamaican officials:

- Ambassador-Audrey Marks

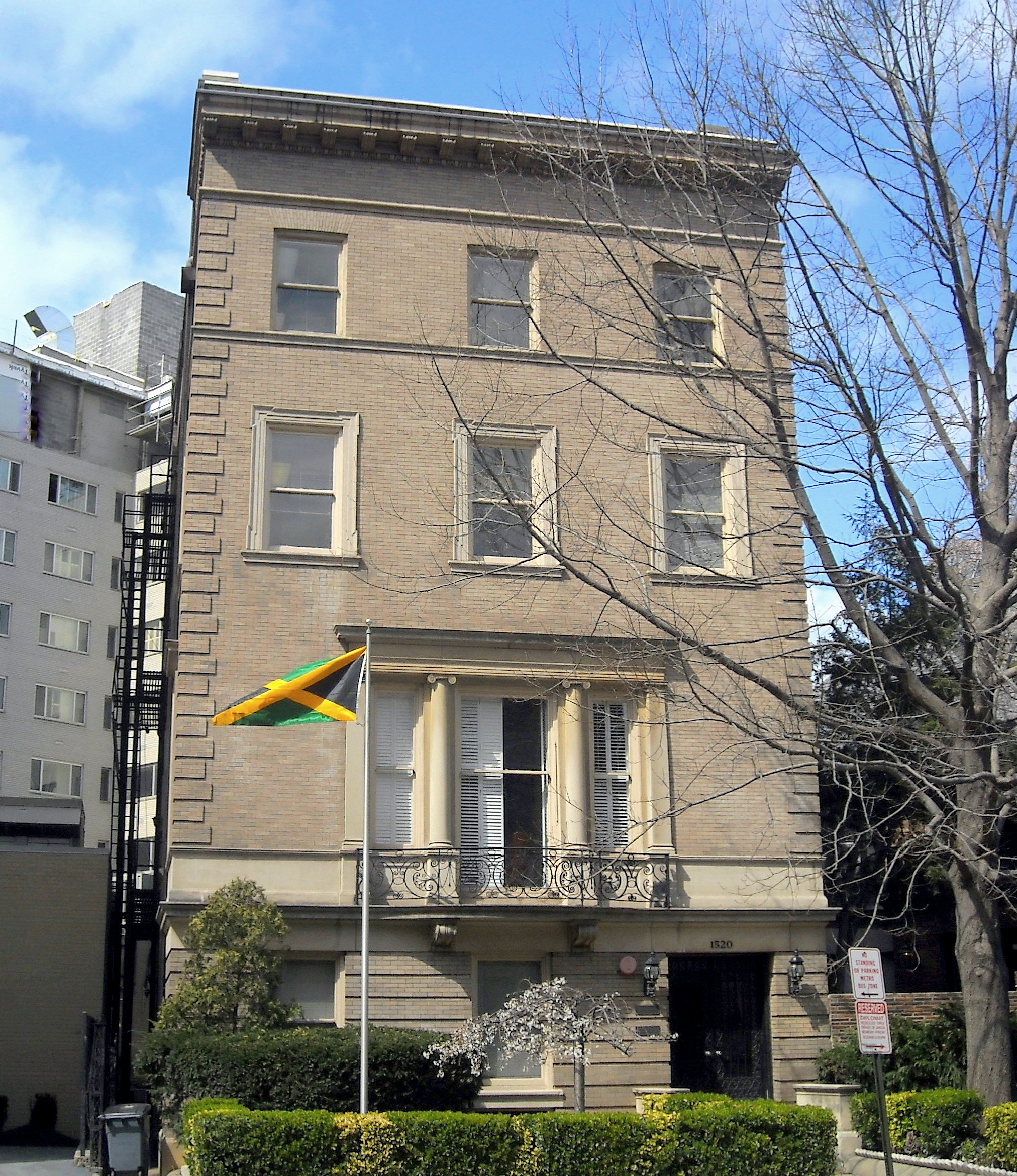

Embassy of Jamaica in Washington, D.C.

- Principal U.S. officials:
- Ambassador—N. Nick Perry
- Deputy Chief of Mission—Amy Tachco
- Economic/Political Section Chief—Cleveland Charles
- USAID Mission Director—Denise Herbol
- Defense Attaché—LTC Brian D Harris
- Chief, Military Liaison Office—LTC Brian D Harris
- Consul General—Michael Schimmel
- Public Affairs Officer—Michael Lavallee
- Peace Corps Director—Jennifer White

== Diplomatic missions ==
The U.S. embassy in Jamaica is in Kingston, as are the USAID Mission and the Peace Corps headquarters.

The Embassy of Jamaica is located in Washington, D.C. The government of Jamaica also maintains three consulates in Miami, Florida and New York City.

== See also ==
- Jamaican Americans
- North American Union
- North American Free Trade Agreement
- Free Trade Area of the Americas
- Third Border Initiative
- Caribbean Community
- Caribbean Basin Initiative (CBI)
- Caribbean Basin Trade Partnership Act
- Western Hemisphere Travel Initiative
- Foreign relations of the United States
- Foreign relations of Jamaica
