= Huizing =

Huizing is a surname. Notable people with the surname include:

- Daan Huizing (born 1990), Dutch golfer
- Matthijs Huizing (born 1960), Dutch politician and sports manager

== See also ==
- Huizinga
