= Bresler's 33 Flavors =

American ice cream chain

Bresler's Ice Cream
- Type: Private
- Founded: 1927; 99 years ago
- Defunct: 2007; 19 years ago
- Fate: Rebranded
- Headquarters: Chicago, Illinois, U.S.
- Number of locations: 300+ at peak
- Area served: U.S.
- Products: Ice cream

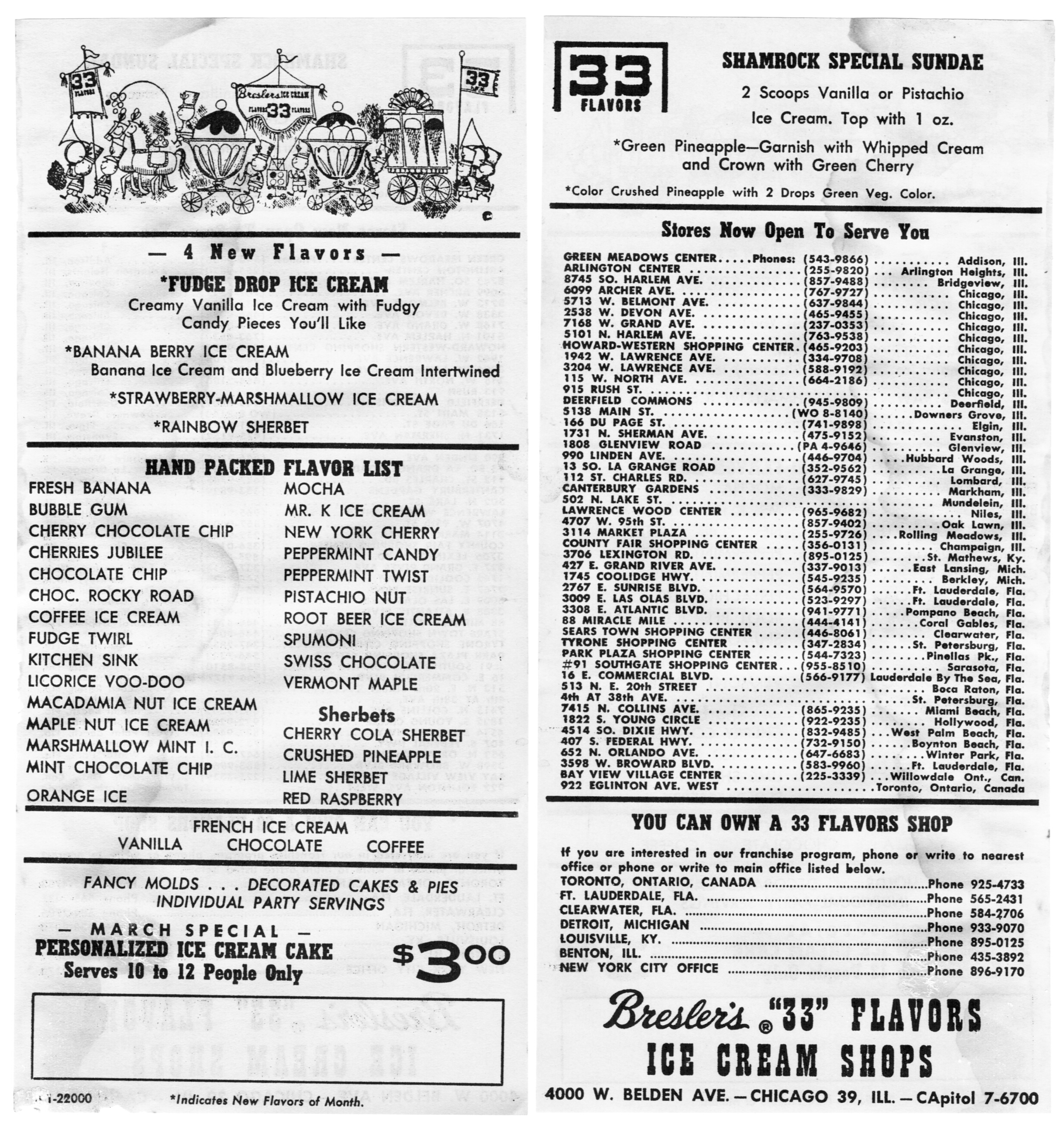
handout

Bresler's 33 Flavors was an American ice cream chain founded in 1927. Its founder was Polish immigrant William J. Bresler, who died in 1985.

In 1954, Bresler's began a fast food hamburger chain called Henry's Hamburgers.

The Bresler's chain was sold in 1987 to Oberweis Dairy in Aurora, Illinois. At the time, it comprised 300 stores, of which 297 were franchises.

Shortly afterward, the chain was renamed from Bresler's 33 Flavors to Bresler's Ice Cream, and added frozen yogurt to its menus to compete with TCBY. Two years later, Oberweis sold the chain to David Lasky.

Yogen Früz parent company CoolBrands acquired the chain in 1995 and began expanding it internationally, including locations in Israel and Egypt. CoolBrands rebranded the last five Bresler's locations in 2007.
