= Swensen's =

American ice cream restaurant chain

Swensen's Inc.
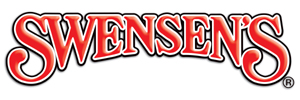
- Type: Subsidiary
- Industry: Restaurant
- Founded: San Francisco, California, United States (1948; 78 years ago)
- Founder: Earle Swensen
- Headquarters: 210 Shields Court, Markham, Ontario, Canada
- Number of locations: 350
- Areas served: Southeast Asia
- Parent: International Franchise Corp.
- Website: www.swensensicecream.com

Swensen's Inc. is an international chain of ice cream restaurants that was founded in San Francisco, California, United States.

== History ==
The company was founded in 1948 by Earle Swensen, who learned to make ice cream while serving in the U.S. Navy during World War II. Swensen opened his first shop at the corner of Union and Hyde Streets, along the cable car tracks in Russian Hill in San Francisco at what had been a failed ice cream parlor. Although vanilla was his lifelong favorite, he developed more than 150 flavors, which he marketed under the motto "Good as Father Used to Make". The original store sold ice cream and other frozen dessert specialties (such as sundaes and banana splits), with primarily take out service. Later, other Swensen's franchisees added indoor seating and offered various types of food, including sandwiches and hamburgers.

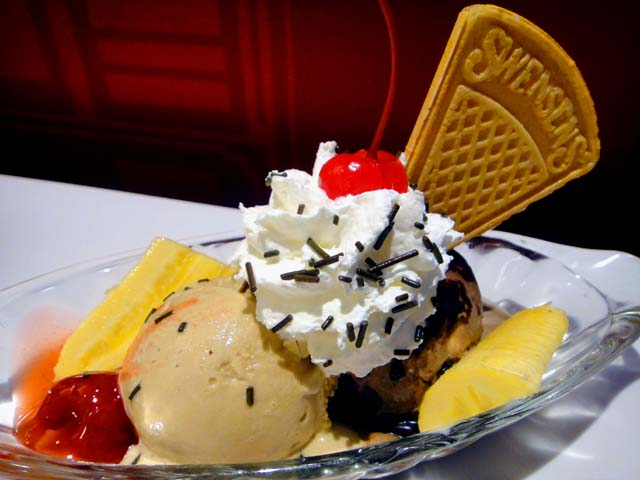
Banana boat ice cream, Swensen's Mall of Asia, Manila, Philippines.

Swensen sold the rights to franchise Swensen's Ice Cream Factories and Restaurants to William Meyer and investors in the 1970s but retained exclusive rights in San Francisco and continued to operate his original store (which still exists today) until 1994, a year before his death at age 83. Under new management the company expanded to 400 stores, mostly franchise locations, by the 1980s. However, in the 1990s, it contracted to half of that size before being acquired and expanding again, mostly in Asia.

By the start of the COVID-19 pandemic at the beginning of 2020 in the United States, the U.S. locations were reduced to a total of three; the original San Francisco ice cream parlor; a restaurant in Midland, Texas; and a restaurant in Coral Gables, Florida. The Texas location rebranded in October 2020 after corporate headquarters refused to allow the franchise to add regional favorites to their menu. The last U.S. franchise location closed in April 2021 in Coral Gables after 44 years in business, leaving the San Francisco store as the last Swensen's in the country.

Today, the company is owned by International Franchise Inc. (IFI) of Markham, Ontario, Canada, which bought the franchise business from former frozen food manufacturer CoolBrands International in 2006. IFI also owns such notable brands as Yogen Früz, I Can't Believe It's Yogurt (ICBY), Golden Swirl, Yogurty's, Dreamery and Bresler's Ice Cream. By 2010, the Swensen's chain had included about 300 franchise outlets worldwide with locations in Asia, the Middle East, South America, India, Taiwan, Singapore, Cambodia, Malaysia, Philippines, Vietnam, Thailand, Laos and Pakistan.

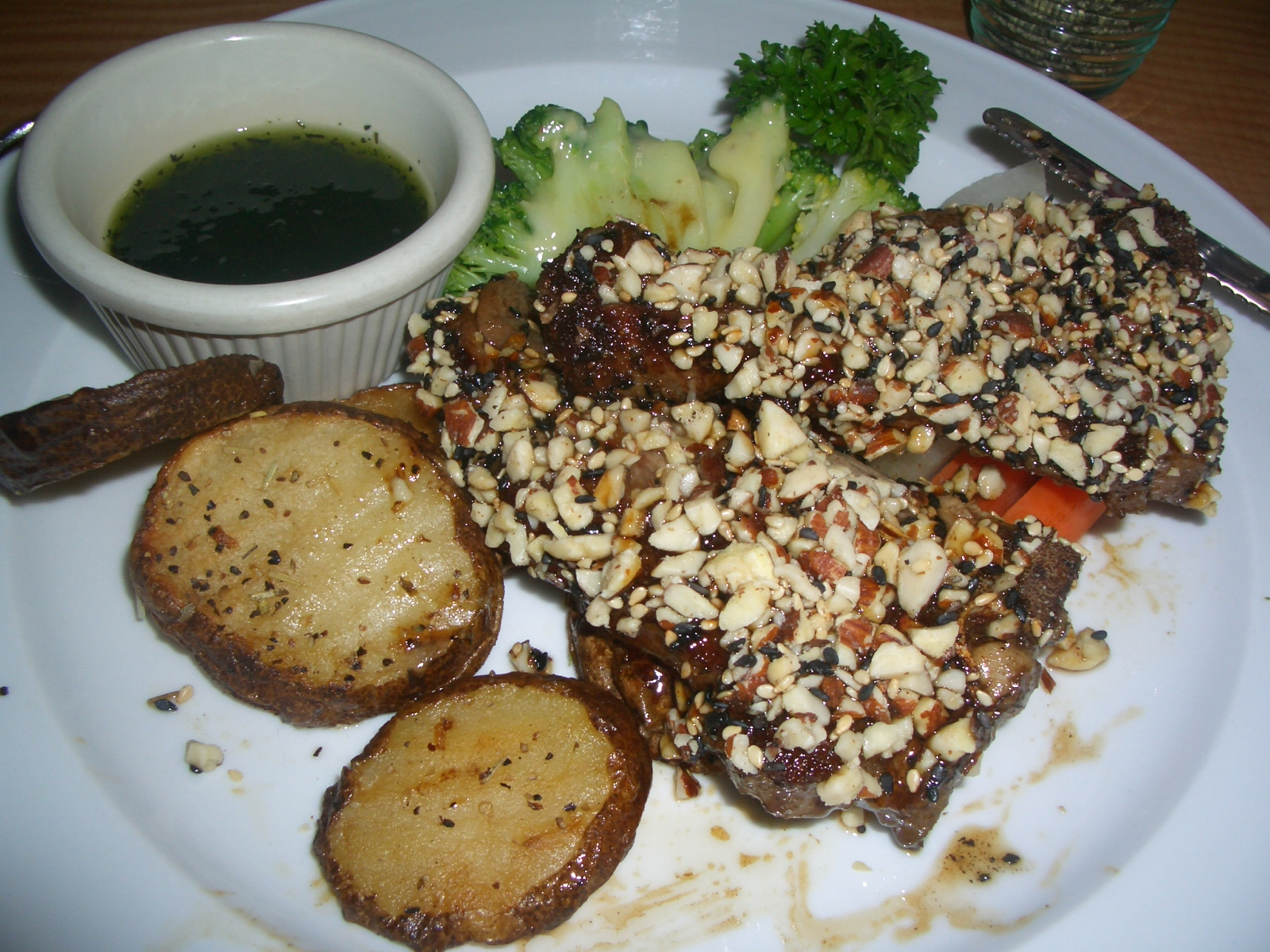
Lamb Chop with almonds, Swensen's Singapore.

In India, the company opened its first store in Bangalore at Mantri Mall, marking the first of 80 stores over the next 5 years scheduled to open all over South India. Swensen's is also now open in Ho Chi Minh City, Vietnam. In March 2014, Swensen's opened its first restaurant in Yangon, Myanmar.

In 1971, Hans Biermann opened a Swensen's in Santa Ana, CA. Eighteen years later, he parted ways with Swensen's and changed the name to Hans’ Homemade Ice Cream and Deli. He still uses the same basic Swensen's recipes and has opened stores in Anaheim and Huntington Beach.

== Popular culture ==
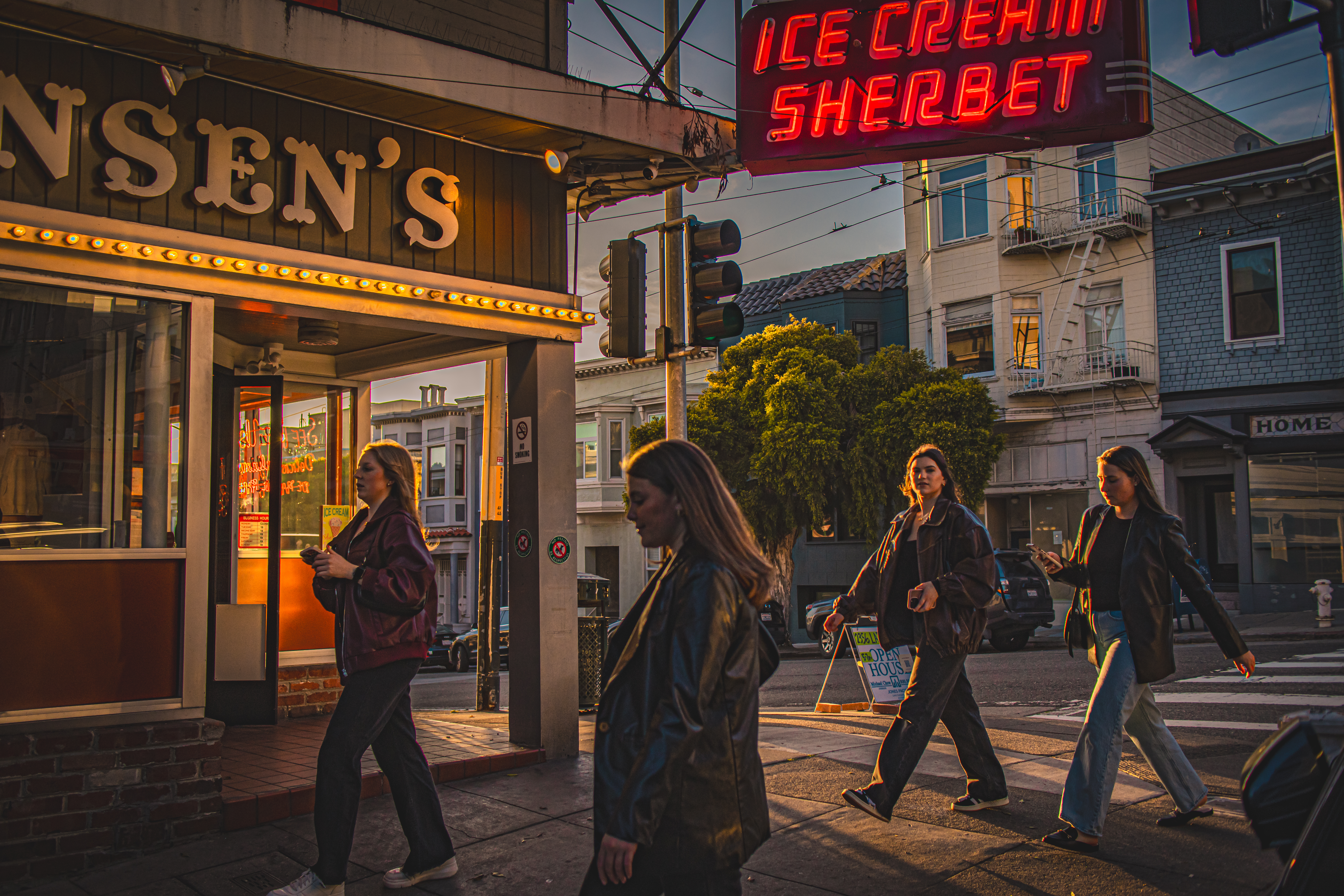
The original Swensen's Ice Cream shop at the top of Russian Hill in San Francisco.

Swensen's was featured as a prize on the 1987 version of Super Sloppy Double Dare and on the 1987 Eure version of Finders Keepers and was featured in the 1985 film The Goonies. A Swensen's store can be glimpsed in the mall sequence of the 1985 film Commando starring Arnold Schwarzenegger, and also in the opening scene of the 1978 film The Silent Partner, which starred Elliott Gould. Seinfeld's "George Costanza" eats Swensen's ice cream after his tonsils are fully removed in the episode, "The Heart Attack." The characters Stacy Hamilton and Linda Barrett originally worked at a Swensen’s store in the 1981 book Fast Times at Ridgemont High but was changed to a Perry’s Pizza store for its 1982 film adaptation.
