= Richard LaMotta =

American attorney and entrepreneur

- Born: Richard Edmund LaMotta; May 20, 1942; Brooklyn, New York, US
- Died: May 11, 2010 (aged 67); Chappaqua, New York, US
- Education: Brooklyn College (B.S., Economics); New York Law School (J.D., 1975)
- Occupations: Business executive, lawyer, inventor, entrepreneur
- Known for: Creator of the Chipwich ice cream sandwich
- Relatives: Jake LaMotta (cousin)

Richard Edmund LaMotta (May 20, 1942 – May 11, 2010) was an American attorney and entrepreneur, the creator and principal promoter of the Chipwich ice cream sandwich, which he introduced to New York City in 1982 with a guerrilla marketing campaign.

== Early life and education ==
Richard Edmund LaMotta was born on May 20, 1942, in Brooklyn, New York, one of two children of Joseph and Mary (Gibbons) LaMotta. An Italian Catholic immigrant from Sicily, his father worked as a drummer and diaper salesman. One of Richard's much older cousins on his father's side was Jake LaMotta (b. 1922), who became the middleweight boxing champion.

LaMotta graduated from Brooklyn Technical High School. He went on to earn a B.S. in Economics from Brooklyn College and then a J.D. from New York Law School in June 1975. He earned both degrees while taking classes at night and working at various jobs during the day, including a job for several years as an audio engineer at CBS for The Ed Sullivan Show.

As a college freshman, LaMotta developed his own record label. After negotiating with the college business office, music professors, and executives at RCA, BMG Music, Deutsche Grammophon, etc., he created a two-record album featuring recordings for the Music 101 class, which was required of all City College of New York students. He sold more than fifty thousand albums.

== Chipwich ==
In 1981, LaMotta developed the Chipwich. On May 1, 1982, he began a guerrilla marketing campaign, in which he trained and enlisted sixty students as street cart vendors to sell the Chipwich on the streets in New York City. A few hours later, all twenty-five thousand Chipwich sandwiches had been sold. After two weeks, forty thousand Chipwiches were being sold each day. The campaign established Chipwich as a successful brand.

CoolBrands International, once the second-largest ice cream distributor in the United States, bought the Chipwich brand in 2002. After encountering financial difficulties in 2004, CoolBrands sold Eskimo Pie and Chipwich to Dreyer's (a division of Nestlé) in 2007, and divested most of its other core businesses. Nestlé ultimately discontinued the Chipwich brand. However, current owners Crave Better Foods LLC relaunched the Chipwich in 2018.

LaMotta was featured in more than 8,000 stories in newspapers, magazines and other media covering the past 25 years. He received the Ad Age Executive Marketing Award, Adweek magazine's Hottest Product of the Year Award, and Sales and Marketing magazine's Entrepreneur of the Year Award.
