= Swisher Hygiene =

American sanitation company

Swisher Hygiene Inc.
- Type: Private formerly Public
- Traded as: Nasdaq: SWSH
- Headquarters: Marrietta, Georgia, United States
- Key people: Richard L Marshall (President & CEO); William T. Nanovsky, CFO/VP; Blake W. Thompson, COO/VP
- Products: Cleaning and sanitizing chemicals, janitorial services
- Revenue: $217.7 million/year
- Operating income: -$52 million/year (loss)
- Net income: -$153 million/year (loss)
- Number of employees: 1375
- Website: www.swisherhygiene.com

Swisher Hygiene Inc. is a sanitation company in the United States which until 2015 traded on the NASDAQ. Originally a janitorial service company, two-thirds of its revenue are now generated by selling cleaning and sanitizing chemicals.

== History ==
Swisher was founded by Patrick Swisher to provide cleaning products and services for restaurants and other businesses. In November 2004, Fort Lauderdale, Florida, entrepreneurs Wayne Huizenga and Steve Berrard bought the firm for a reported $14 million.

Huizenga and Berrard paid Patrick $8.1 million for more than 900,000 shares to obtain a majority stake in the company. They operated Swisher as a private company until November 2, 2010, when Swisher became publicly traded through a reverse takeover of CoolBrands International Inc.

CoolBrands was once a major frozen food and dessert manufacturer based in Markham, Ontario. Due to financial problems, it had sold its core operating businesses (including Breyers yoghurt, Eskimo Pie and Chipwich) in 2007 and was little more than an empty corporate shell, but was still listed on the Toronto Stock Exchange. Swisher, through the reverse takeover, acquired the strength of CoolBrands' balance sheet and CoolBrands' status as a publicly traded enterprise.

As a publicly traded company, Swisher could pay in stock or partially in stock for acquisitions of other companies. It went on an acquisition spree in 2011, purchasing 54 different businesses nominally valued at $220 million. The acquisitions increased gross revenue but did not bring the company to profitability.

Swisher had purchased Fort Lauderdale-based Choice Environmental Services in February 2011 for $50 million in stock and an assumption of $41.5 million in debt. Glenn Miller and Neal Rodrigue, the former owners of Choice Environmental Services, had become the fourth-largest shareholders in Swisher under a merger agreement but were restricted from selling any of their shares, causing them substantial losses when the stock plummeted. They later sued.

The company had to re-state its 2011 financial information due to accounting irregularities, increasing that year's losses by $4.8 million before taxes. It incurred repeated quarterly losses through much of 2012, a year for which it missed Toronto Stock Exchange deadlines for both quarterly and annual financial reports. At one point, NASDAQ had threatened to de-list the stock due to reporting delays.

On November 15, 2012, Swisher sold Choice Environmental Services to Waste Services of Florida for $125,000,000 in cash, using the money to repay debt.

The company's losses extended into 2012 and 2013. Thomas Byrne, previously president of Viacom and vice-chairman of Blockbuster Video, became Swisher's Interim President and CEO in February 2013 in an attempt to turn the company around. Wayne Huizenga, who worked with Byrne at Blockbuster, became chairman of the board. The company's stock by mid-year was trading below a dollar a share and the company lost $3/share in 2013, losses which continued into 2014.

On June 4, 2014, a reverse stock split replaced every ten existing shares in Swisher with one new share, as the company had to be brought out of penny stock territory and back above $1/share to retain a NASDAQ listing. As of July 2014, the stock was trading slightly above $4/share.

On Nov 2, 2015, the company's US operations were sold to Ecolab for $40.2 million and the company no longer has operating assets or revenue producing operations in the US.
