= Douglas M. Baker Jr. =

American businessman

- Born: December 5, 1958 (age 67); Carmel-by-the-Sea, California, U.S.
- Education: College of the Holy Cross (BA)
- Title: Chairman of Ecolab

Douglas M. Baker Jr. (born December 5, 1958) is an American business executive who is the executive chairman of the board of the sanitation products manufacturing company Ecolab. He was previously the company's president and chief operating officer (COO) from 2002 to 2004 and its chief executive officer (CEO) from 2004 to 2020.

== Early life and education ==
Baker was born in Carmel-by-the-Sea, California, in 1958. His family later moved to Minnesota after his father, Douglas Baker Sr., accepted an executive position with the Pillsbury Company. Baker grew up in Minneapolis and graduated from West High School. As a high school student, he played ice hockey and initially considered pursuing the sport as a career.

After high school, Baker received a scholarship to the College of the Holy Cross in Worcester, Massachusetts. He played hockey at Holy Cross until his sophomore year, when bouts of mononucleosis and hepatitis forced him to stop playing. He graduated from Holy Cross in 1981 with a Bachelor of Arts degree in English. After graduating, Baker spent the following year in Aspen, Colorado, as a skier before beginning his business career.

== Career ==
Baker joined Ecolab in 1989, initially holding various marketing and leadership positions in the U.S. and Europe including vice president and general manager of Kay Chemical Co. a division of Ecolab that provides cleaning and sanitizing programs tailored specifically for the quick food service (fast food) and food retail (supermarket and grocery) markets.

Baker then became vice president of Ecolab’s Institutional business sector, which provides cleaning and sanitation products, programs and services to food service, hospitality, healthcare, and commercial customers in North America.

Baker was named Ecolab’s president and chief operating officer in 2002, president and chief executive officer in 2004 and added chairman of the board responsibilities in 2006. From 12/31/2013 to 12/31/2017, Ecolab's sales grew from $3.6 billion to $14 billion, a 268% increase, and shareholder's equity increased 476%.

Baker has received numerous awards and recognition throughout his career. Most recently, he was awarded the 2018 Deming Cup for Operational Excellence. He was named to the Forbes Global 2000: Hall of Fame CEOs, and named 2014 Responsible CEO of the Year by Corporate Responsibility Magazine. He also was named one of the world's top CEOs by Harvard Business Review in 2016 (#41) and 2017 (#39) and was inducted into the Minnesota Business Hall of Fame in 2012.

Before joining Ecolab, Baker spent seven years with Procter & Gamble in various brand management positions.

In addition to his Ecolab responsibilities, Baker serves as a member of the board of directors of Target Corporation, as a member of the board of trustees of Mayo Clinic, and as trustee emeritus of the National Restaurant Association Educational Foundation. He is a former member of the board of directors of U.S. Bancorp and past member of the board of overseers at the University of Minnesota. He also serves on the board of trustees of the College of the Holy Cross, his alma mater.

== Community involvement ==
Baker is active in the civic life of the Twin Cities of Minneapolis and St. Paul, Minn. He serves on the executive committee of the Greater MSP Partnership, a private-public partnership whose mission is to stimulate economic growth and prosperity in the region. Baker also serves on the board of overseers of the Carlson School of Management at the University of Minnesota and on the executive committee of the Minnesota Business Partnership, an organization of CEOs from Minnesota’s top 100 companies focused on further enhancing the region’s quality of life. He is a board member of Parent Aware for School Readiness (PASR), a nonprofit organization to support the statewide expansion of Parent Aware, Minnesota’s Quality Rating and Improvement System. Baker and his wife Julie also chaired the 2012 Twin Cities United Way fundraising campaign.

Baker also was a co-chair of the host committee for Super Bowl LII, which was held in February 2018 in Minneapolis. He co-led a successful $40 million campaign for Catholic Charities to support a new campus for homeless services in downtown St. Paul.
