= 1520 New Hampshire Avenue =

Coordinates: 38.910536°N 77.042612°W

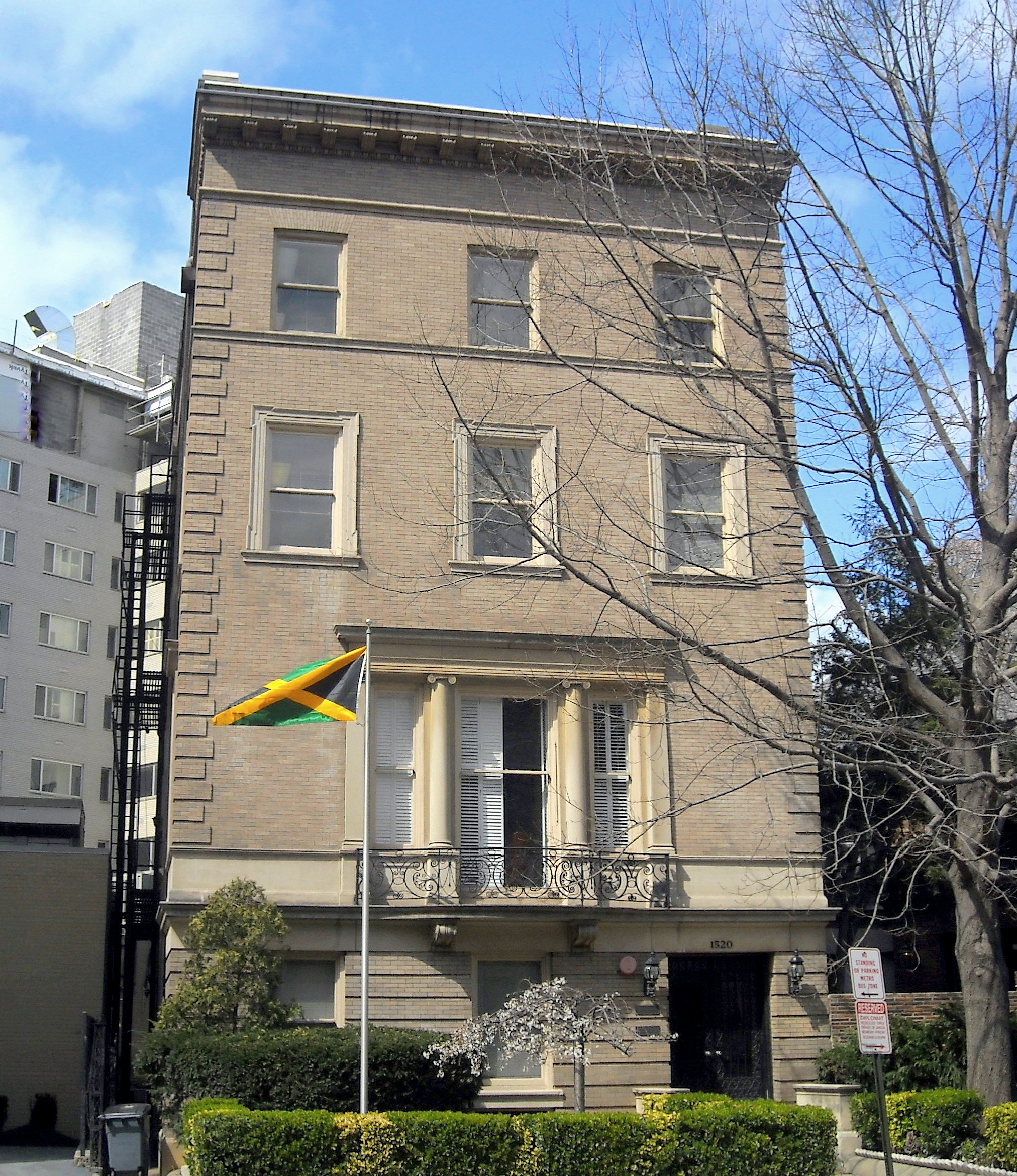
1520 New Hampshire Avenue, currently the Embassy of Jamaica to the United States of America (2009)

1520 New Hampshire Avenue, NW is located in the Dupont Circle neighbourhood of Washington, D.C. It has had a number of notable owners, and is currently home to the Embassy of Jamaica to the United States of America.

== Architecture ==
The building, an example of Beaux-Arts architecture, is a contributing property to the Dupont Circle Historic District and valued at $4,422,000. Beaux-Arts is a neoclassical architectural style that was taught at the École des Beaux-Arts in Paris.

== Ownership ==
Notable owners of the property have included Beekman Winthrop, George P. McLean, life insurance executive and philanthropist Thomas Bell Sweeney Sr., the Institute for Policy Studies, and the Children's Defense Fund.
