= Henry's Hamburgers =

American restaurant in Benton Harbor, Michigan

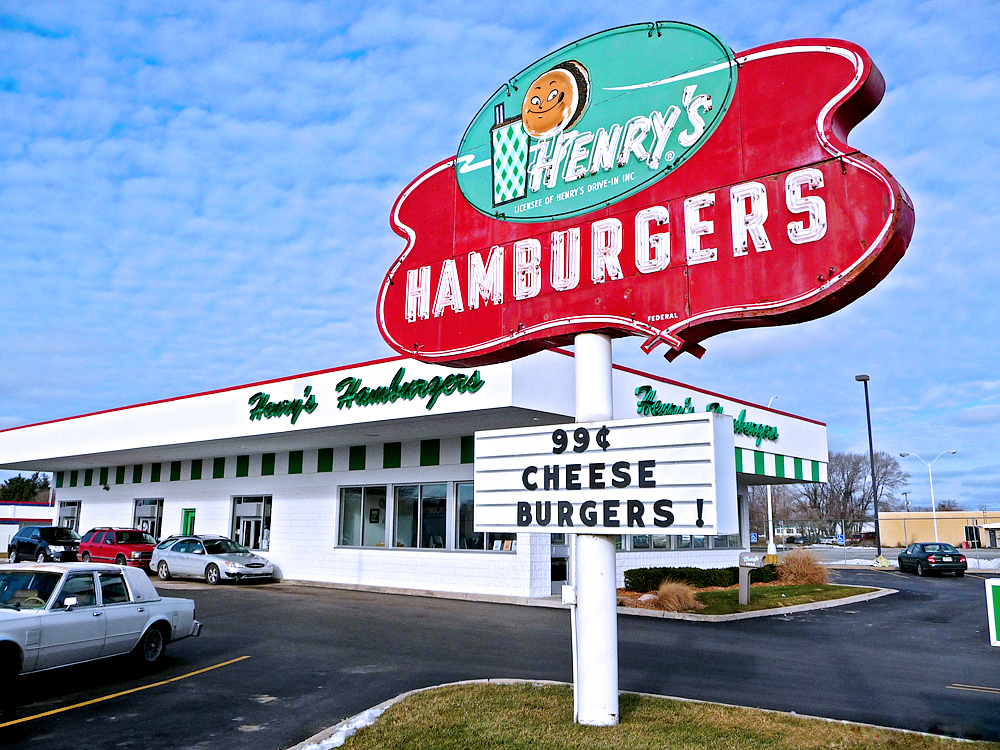
- Restaurant in Benton Harbor, Michigan, 2009
- Type: Wholly owned subsidiary
- Industry: Restaurants
- Genre: Fast Food
- Founded: 1954; 72 years ago
- Headquarters: Chicago, Illinois, U.S.
- Products: Fast food (including hamburgers, French fries, and milkshakes)
- Parent: Bresler's Ice Cream
- Website: http://www.henryshamburgers.com/

Henry's Hamburgers is a former American fast-food restaurant chain of the 1950s, 1960s, and 1970s. Only one franchise store, in Michigan, remains.

== History ==
In 1954 the Bresler's Ice Cream Company decided to expand into the growing fast-food drive-in industry. Company executives were looking for a new outlet to promote higher sales of their malts and shakes without altering their existing ice cream shop franchises. Under the name Henry's Hamburgers, many franchises were eventually established. The name Henry was chosen to honor the memory of the late Henry Bresler, one of the brothers who had founded the ice cream company. Henry's was modelled after James Collin's Hamburger Handout restaurants in Southern California, which in turn had been modelled after the McDonald brother's San Bernardino operation. They were both a Chicago-area competitor and copy of McDonald's.

=== Growth ===
By 1956, Henry's Hamburgers had 35 locations in the Chicago area. At the time that outnumbered some of the industry's current giants, such as McDonald's. By the early 1960s there were over 200 Henry's restaurants across America with operations headquarters in Chicago. Henry's used the advertising slogans "Aren't you hungry for a Henry's?" and "Head for Henry's", and offered burgers for as low as 15 cents or "ten burgers for a buck".

=== Decline ===
By the mid-1970s Henry's Hamburger locations began closing while repeated mergers and ownership changes took place within the Bresler company. The only remaining location is in Benton Harbor, Michigan.

== See also ==
- List of defunct fast-food restaurant chains
- List of hamburger restaurants
