= Embassy of Jamaica, Washington, D.C. =

Diplomatic mission of Jamaica to the United States

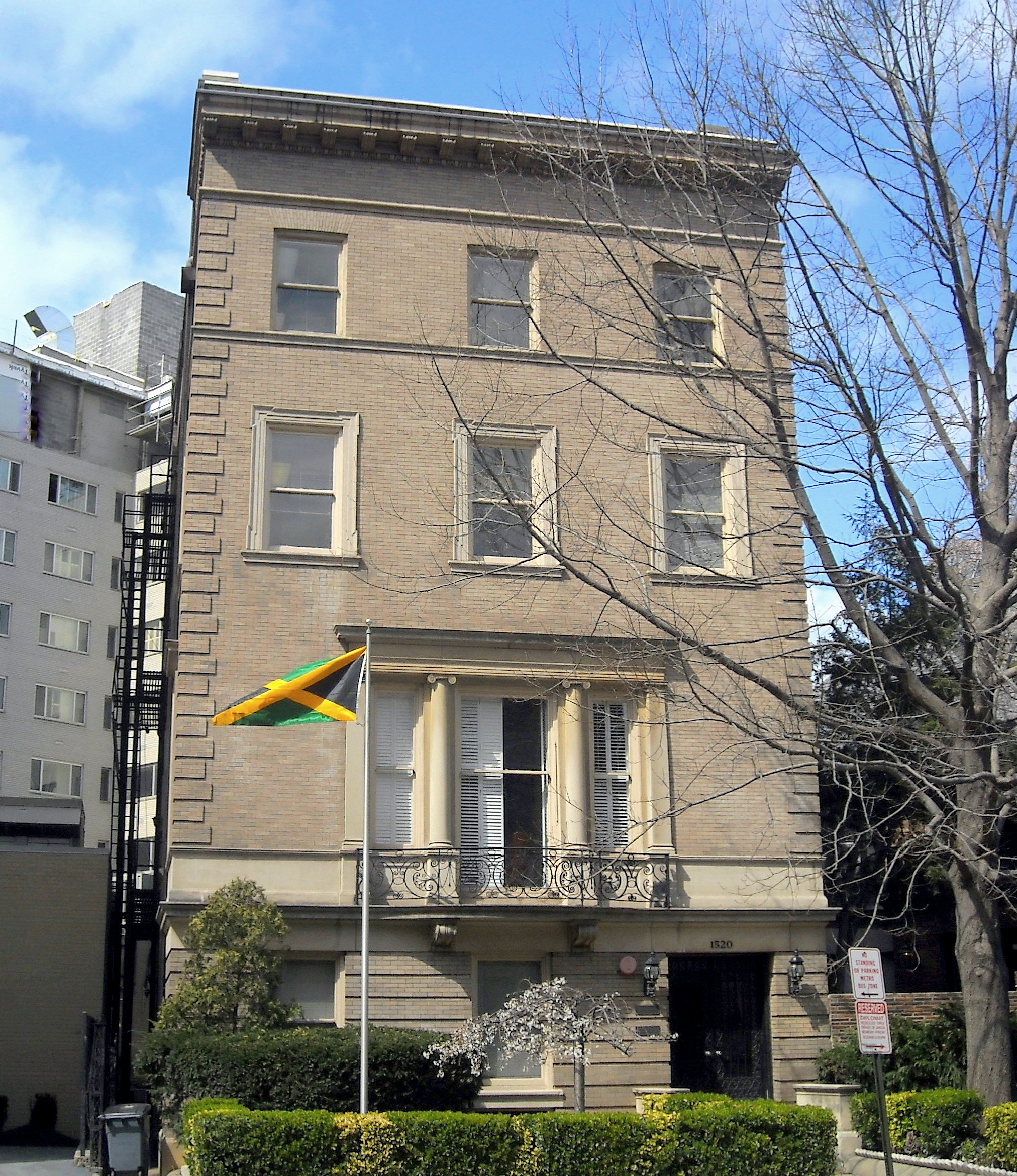
- Embassy of Jamaica in 2009
- Location: Washington, D.C.
- Address: 1520 New Hampshire Avenue, N.W.
- Coordinates: 38°54′37.93″N 77°2′33.4″W
- Ambassador: Audrey Marks

The Embassy of Jamaica in Washington, D.C. is the primary diplomatic mission of Jamaica to the United States.

It is located at 1520 New Hampshire Avenue, NW in the Dupont Circle neighborhood of Washington, D.C. The government of Jamaica established its first embassy in the U.S. on August 16, 1962.

== Services ==
The Jamaican Embassy is supported by two Consulates- General located in Miami and New York City. The Jamaican embassy provides a point of contact for Jamaican citizens and expatriates living, working or vacationing in the U.S. It also handles visa applications for Americans wishing to travel to Jamaica. The embassy is headed by Audrey P. Marks, the current ambassador of Jamaica to the United States. The ambassador is responsible for the majority of diplomacy conducted between the two countries and represents her country around the U.S. through activities such as giving speeches to, for example, academic institutions.

== Chancery ==
=== Architecture ===
The embassy's current building, an example of Beaux-Arts architecture, is a contributing property to the Dupont Circle Historic District and valued at $4.422 million.

=== Ownership ===
Notable owners of the property have included Beekman Winthrop, George P. McLean, author Thomas Bell Sweeney, the Institute for Policy Studies, and the Children's Defense Fund.

== See also ==
- Jamaica–United States relations
- List of diplomatic missions in the United States
- List of diplomatic missions in Washington, D.C.
- List of diplomatic missions of Jamaica
