= Marymount High School, Jamaica =

Marymount High School

Location
- Highgate, Jamaica, St Mary; Jamaica
- Coordinates: 18.2568937°N 76.865142°W

Information
- Motto: In virtute et veritate
- Religious affiliation: Christianity
- Denomination: Roman Catholic
- Established: 1935
- Principal: Alphonso Christie
- Grades: 7-13
- Gender: Female
- Colours: blue, brown, white
- Athletics: Great
- Sports: Netball

Marymount High School is an all-girls school in Cromwell and Highgate, St Mary, Jamaica. It was established in 1935 by sisters of the Franciscan Order. It has 840 students.

== Notable alumni ==
- Audrey Marks, ambassador
