= Huizinga =

Huizinga is a Dutch surname. Notable people with the surname include:

- Chris Huizinga (born 1997), Dutch speed skater
- Chuck Huizinga (born 1953), Dutch-Canadian hockey player
- Ilse Huizinga (born 1966), Dutch singer
- Johan Huizinga, Dutch historian
- Mark Huizinga, Dutch judoka and Olympic gold medalist
- Tineke Huizinga, Dutch politician

== See also ==
- Huizenga (name)
