= Earle Swensen =

American businessman

- Born: 14 June 1912; San Francisco
- Died: 1996 (aged 83–84)
- Known for: Founding Swensen's

Earle Swensen (14 June 1912—1996) was an American businessman who founded Swensen's, an ice cream restaurant chain.

== Career ==
Swensen was born in San Francisco and grew up in the city. During World War II, he served in the South Pacific, and during that time, learned how to make ice cream. In 1948, He founded Swensen's ice cream near Russian Hill, San Francisco. The first store was known as See Us Freeze Ice Cream. In 1965, Swensen moved to Novato, California and developed 150 ice cream flavors.

== Personal life ==
Swensen was married to Nora, who died in 1995. He died in 1996 due to heart failure.
