= Glen W. Swensen =

American lawyer and politician (1910–2000)

Glen W. Swensen (April 8, 1910 – February 14, 2000) was an American lawyer and politician.

Swensen was born in Buffalo, Wright County, Minnesota and graduated from Buffalo High School. He received his law degree from University of Minnesota Law School, in 1935, and was admitted to the Minnesota bar. Swensen lived in Buffalo, Minnesota with his wife and family. He served in the United States Army during World War II. He served as the Wright County Treasurer and the Wright County Attorney. Swensen then served in the Minnesota House of Representatives from 1956 to 1962 and in the Minnesota Senate from 1963 to 1966. He served as the Minnesota District Court Judge from 1972 until his retirement in 1983. Swensen died at his home in Buffalo, Minnesota and was buried in Buffalo, Minnesota.
