= Chipwich =

Ice cream sandwich

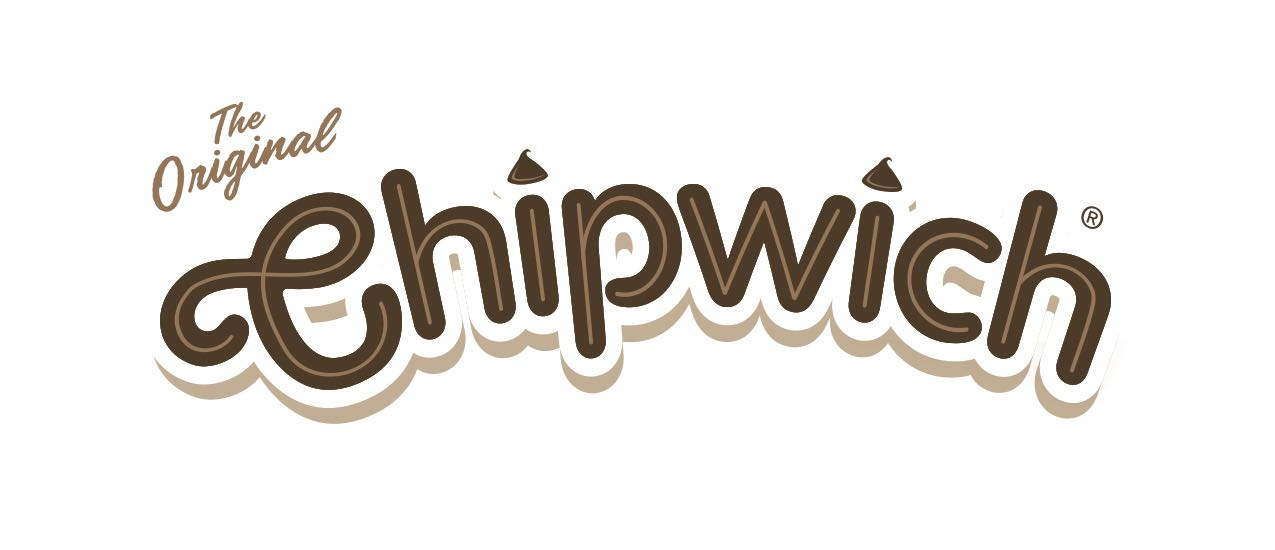
- Product type: Ice cream cookie sandwich
- Current owner: Crave Better Foods (a United States limited liability corporation), Cos Cob, Connecticut
- Country: U.S.
- Introduced: 1981
- Markets: United States
- Previous owners: Richard LaMotta, Sam Metzger, Chipwich, Dreyer's division of Nestlé

The Chipwich is a pre-packaged brand of frozen ice cream sandwich composed of two large, thick chocolate chip cookies sandwiching a vanilla ice cream filling. The Chipwich name and logo is trademarked by Crave Better Foods, LLC based in Cos Cob, Connecticut.

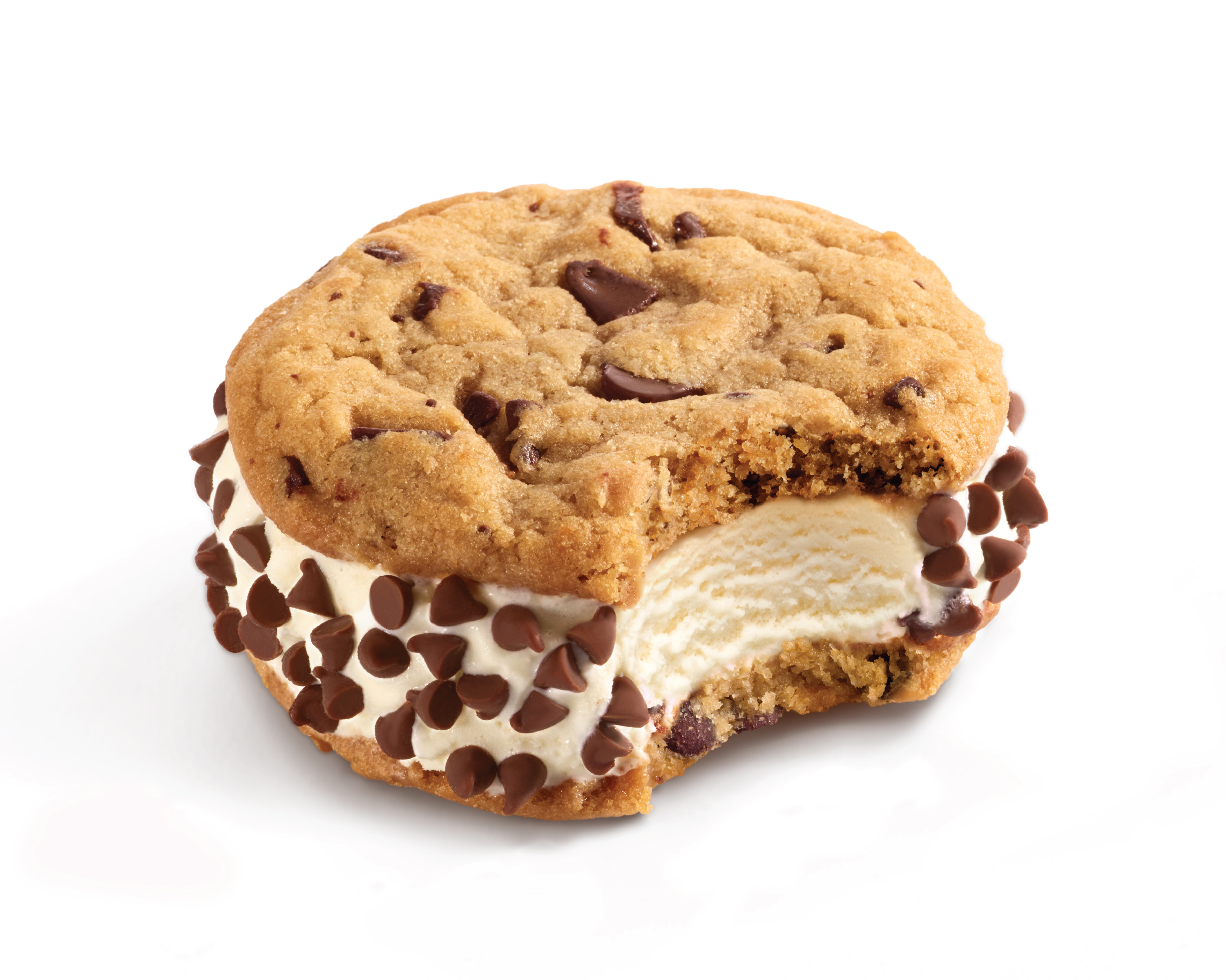
Studio photo of Chipwich ice cream sandwich

== History ==
While ice cream sandwiches have been sold in New York City since the 1890s, New York lawyer Richard LaMotta created the Chipwich in 1978. He introduced it to the city in 1981 with a guerrilla marketing campaign, training sixty street cart vendors (mostly students) to sell the new product on the streets of New York, for a dollar each. Some twenty-five thousand Chipwiches were sold the first day, and within two weeks the company was selling 40,000 a day.

The small, independent company struggled to find capital to expand. In 1984, Chipwich sought Chapter 11 bankruptcy protection. By 1987, co-founders LaMotta and Samuel Metzger had reorganized the company and obtained a $1 million investment from Swedish holding company Hexagon AB, which guaranteed loans and licensed its products. In 1992, the company was back in Chapter 11 bankruptcy after incurring a $1.4 million loss on sales of $4.8 million; an accounting scandal involving inventory overstatements at Peltz Food, a subsidiary headed by Robert Peltz, were at the root of much of the problem.

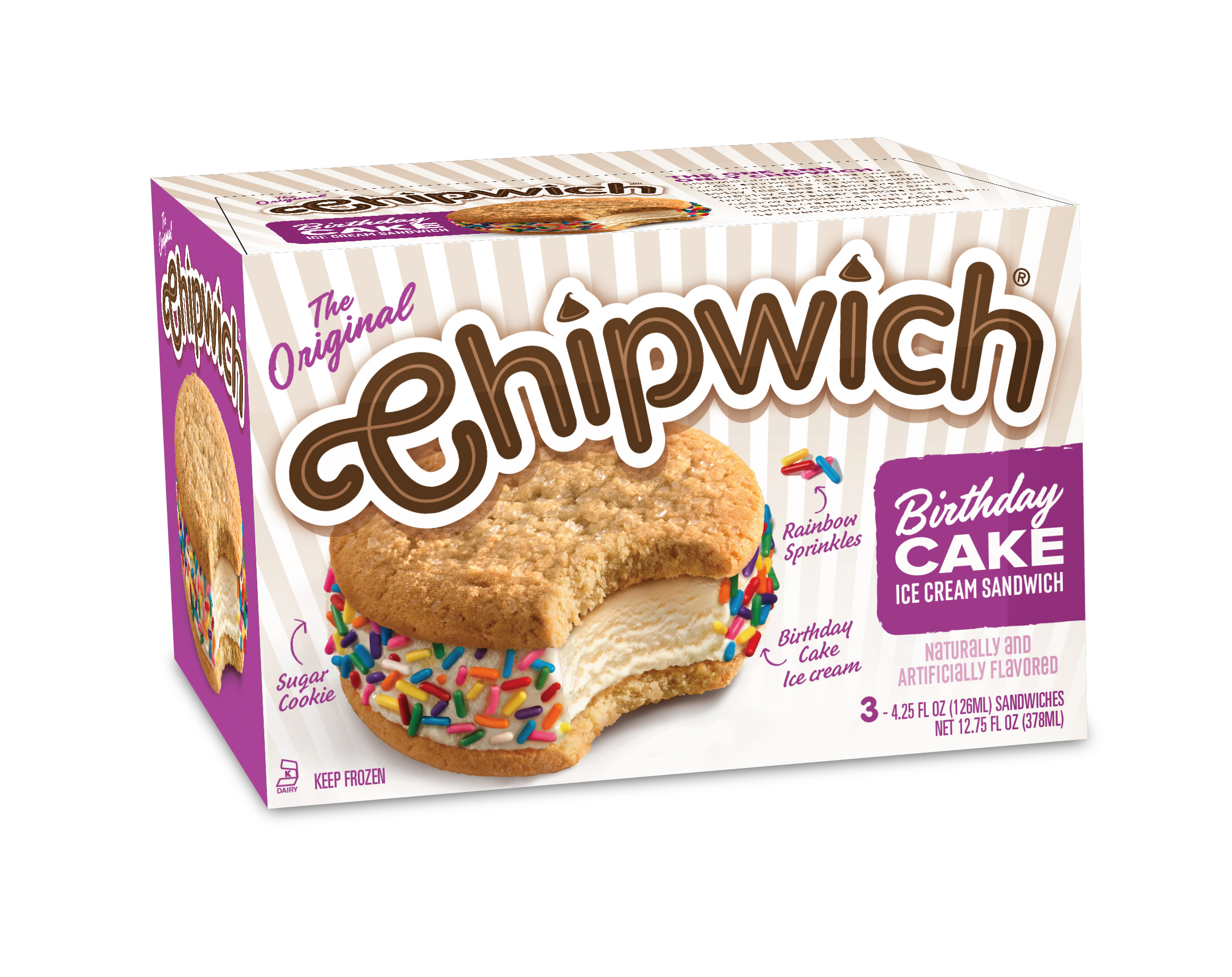
Package for the birthday cake flavor Chipwich, introduced in 2020

CoolBrands International bought Chipwich in 2002, becoming North America's third-largest ice cream vendor. Due to a series of financial difficulties, which began with the loss of its Weight Watchers/Smart Ones frozen food licence in 2004, CoolBrands sold Chipwich, Eskimo Pie and Real Fruit to the Dreyer's division of Nestlé in 2007. This was part of a larger divestiture of core assets which left the company as little more than a publicly listed empty shell. By 2009, Nestlé had stopped production of the original Chipwich, reportedly because it competed with its own Toll House chocolate chip cookie ice cream sandwich.

The trademark was acquired in 2017 by Crave Better Foods, LLC of Cos Cob, Connecticut. The product was relaunched in 2018 in the U.S. In 2020, the brand introduced a new flavor, birthday cake, to its product line.

== See also ==
- Sandwich cookie
