= Audrey Marks =

Jamaican politician and businesswoman (born 1963)

Her Excellency The Honourable Audrey Marks OJ MP
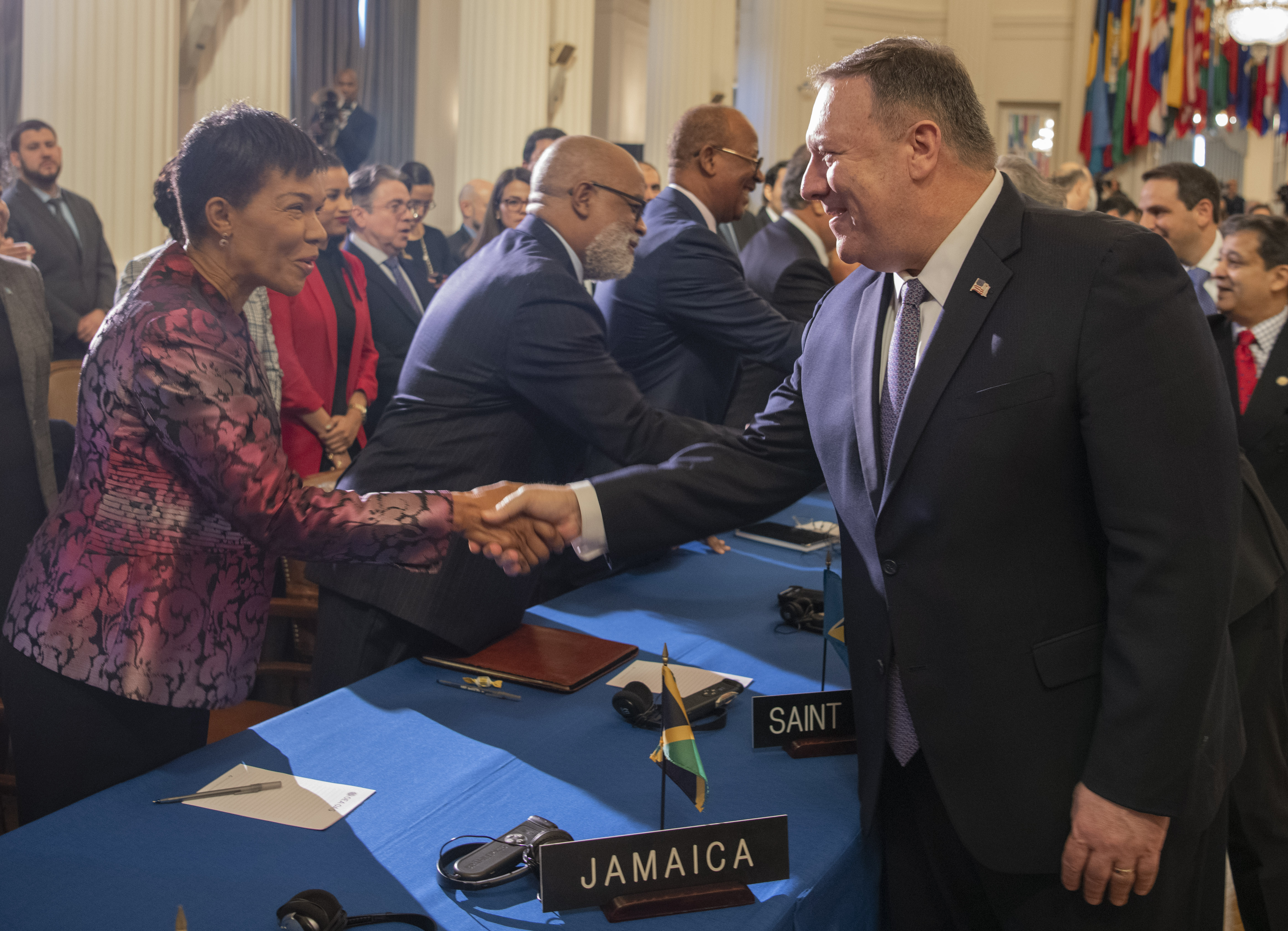
- Marks with US Secretary of State Mike Pompeo in 2020

Minister of Efficiency, Innovation and Digital Transformation
- Incumbent
- Assumed office September 2025

Jamaican Ambassador to the United States
- In office 12 September 2016 – 2025
- Prime Minister: Andrew Holness
- Preceded by: Ralph Thomas
- Succeeded by: Antony Bertram Anderson
- In office May 2010 – June 2012
- Prime Minister: Bruce Golding; Portia Simpson-Miller
- Preceded by: Anthony Johnson
- Succeeded by: Stephen Vasciannie

Member of Parliament for Manchester North Eastern
- Incumbent
- Assumed office 3 September 2025

Personal details
- Born: Audrey Patrice Marks; 30 April 1968 (age 58) Saint Mary, Jamaica
- Spouse: Jassel Dunstan
- Children: 2
- Education: University of the West Indies (BA); Nova Southeastern University (MBA)
- Occupation: Diplomat, entrepreneur

Audrey Patrice Marks (born 30 April 1968) has served two terms as Jamaica's Ambassador to the United States from 2010 to 2012 and again starting in 2016 until 2025. She is Jamaica's first female Ambassador to the US and the first individual to hold the position twice in two separate terms. She simultaneously serves as Jamaica's permanent representative to the Organization of American States.

== Background ==
Prior to assuming her Ambassadorial role, Ambassador Marks, an entrepreneur by profession, started and operated six previous businesses, including a 100-acre banana exporting farm, a transportation company, as well as a real estate sales and development company. She also operated a Venture Capital Company with diverse investments, including manufacturing, travel, and entertainment.

She is perhaps best known for having founded Paymaster (Jamaica) Limited, an online bill payment system which she conceptualized and started in 1997. Paymaster operates payment agencies from which all types of bill payments and remittances can be made and is the first multi-transaction agency in the Caribbean.

Ambassador Marks has also served on several private and public sector Boards, including being the Chairman of the Central Wastewater Treatment Company Limited (CWTC); Chair of the Tourism Product Development Company (TPDCo); Deputy Chair of the Urban Development Corporation (UDC); Director of the Board of RBTT Securities Jamaica Limited; Jamaica Trade and Invest (JTI); National Health Fund (NHF); and the University of the West Indies (Mona School of Business). She has the distinction of being the first female President of the American Chamber of Commerce of Jamaica (AMCHAM), an organization that promotes investment and trade between the United States and Jamaica.

== Early life and education ==
She attended Marymount High School after St Theresa's Preparatory and finished high school at Immaculate Conception High School in Jamaica. She holds a Bachelor's and a Master's degree in Business Administration from the University of the West Indies, Mona, Jamaica, and Nova University, Florida in the U.S. respectively.

== Awards and honours ==
Ambassador Marks is the recipient of numerous citations and recognition from her peers and various organizations for her pioneering work, entrepreneurial endeavours and commitment to social causes. These include: Ernest & Young Nominee for the "Caribbean Entrepreneur of the Year 2000"; Business Leader of the Year Award nominee for 2000; and the Florida International University Business Leader of the Year Award for 2003 and 2010.

She was also awarded the distinguished Doctor of Laws, honoris causa from Northern Caribbean University (NCU).
