= H. Wayne Huizenga College of Business and Entrepreneurship =

Business school at Nova Southeastern University

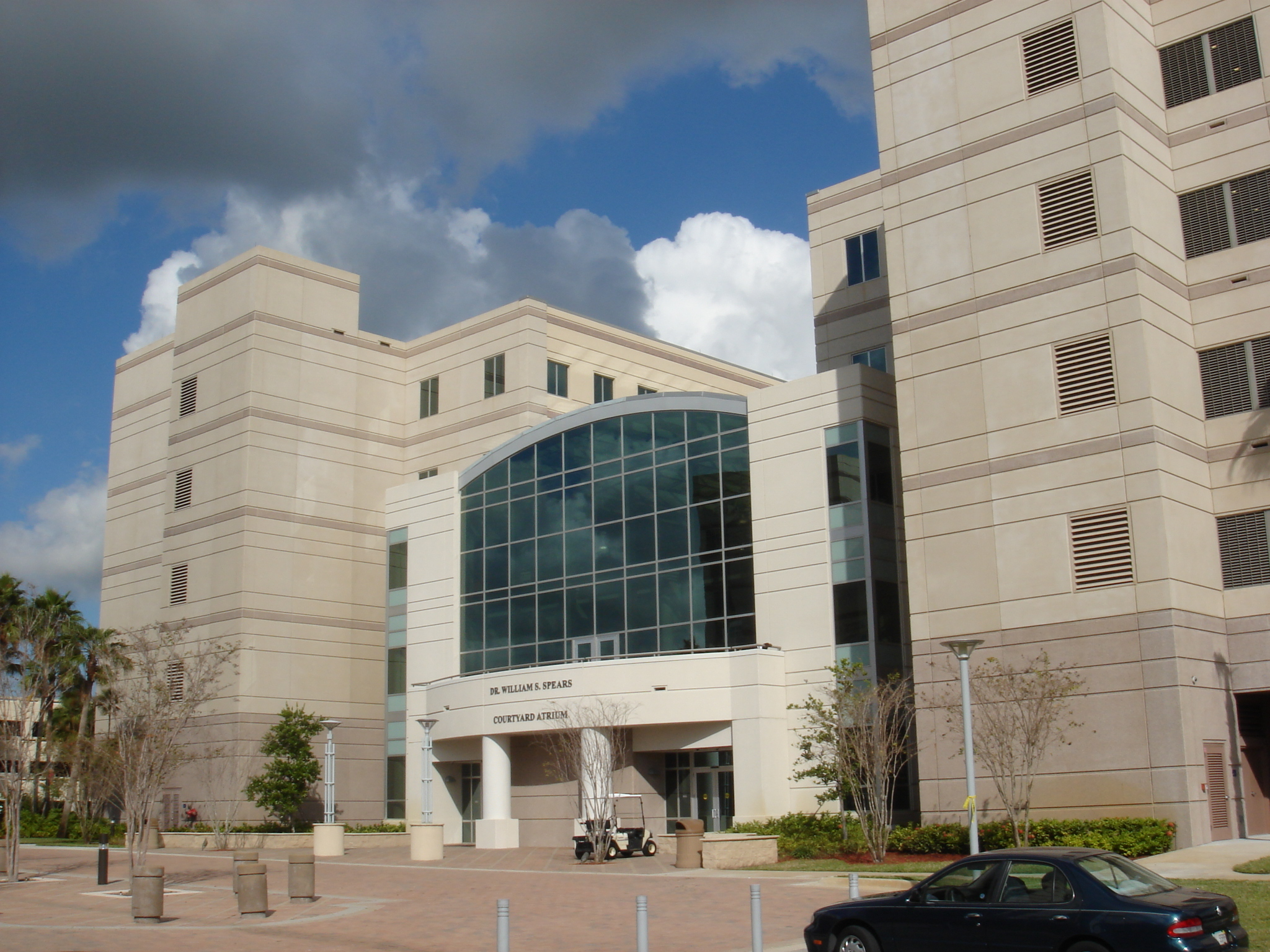
Southern entrance of the Carl DeSantis Building

The H. Wayne Huizenga College of Business and Entrepreneurship is the business school of Nova Southeastern University in Davie, Florida, United States, and is accredited by Commission on Colleges of the Southern Association of Colleges and Schools, and internationally by the International Assembly for Collegiate Business Education and the University Council of Jamaica.

Named after businessman and philanthropist Wayne Huizenga, the college (also known as HCBE) serves over 4,800 bachelors, masters, and doctoral students in a variety of degree programs.

== Hall of Fame ==
The Entrepreneur and Business Hall of Fame program awards the college's highest honor to nominees each year.

== Degree programs ==
The college offers multiple bachelor's and master's programs.

- BSBA in Accounting
- B.S.B.A. in Entrepreneurship
- B.S.B.A. in Finance
- B.S.B.A. in Management
- B.S.B.A. in Marketing
- B.S.B.A. in Sport and Recreation Management
- M.Acc. in Managerial Accounting
- M.Acc. in Public Accounting
- M.Acc. in Taxation Accounting
- M.B.A. in multiple concentrations
- M.P.A. in multiple concentrations

== Facilities ==
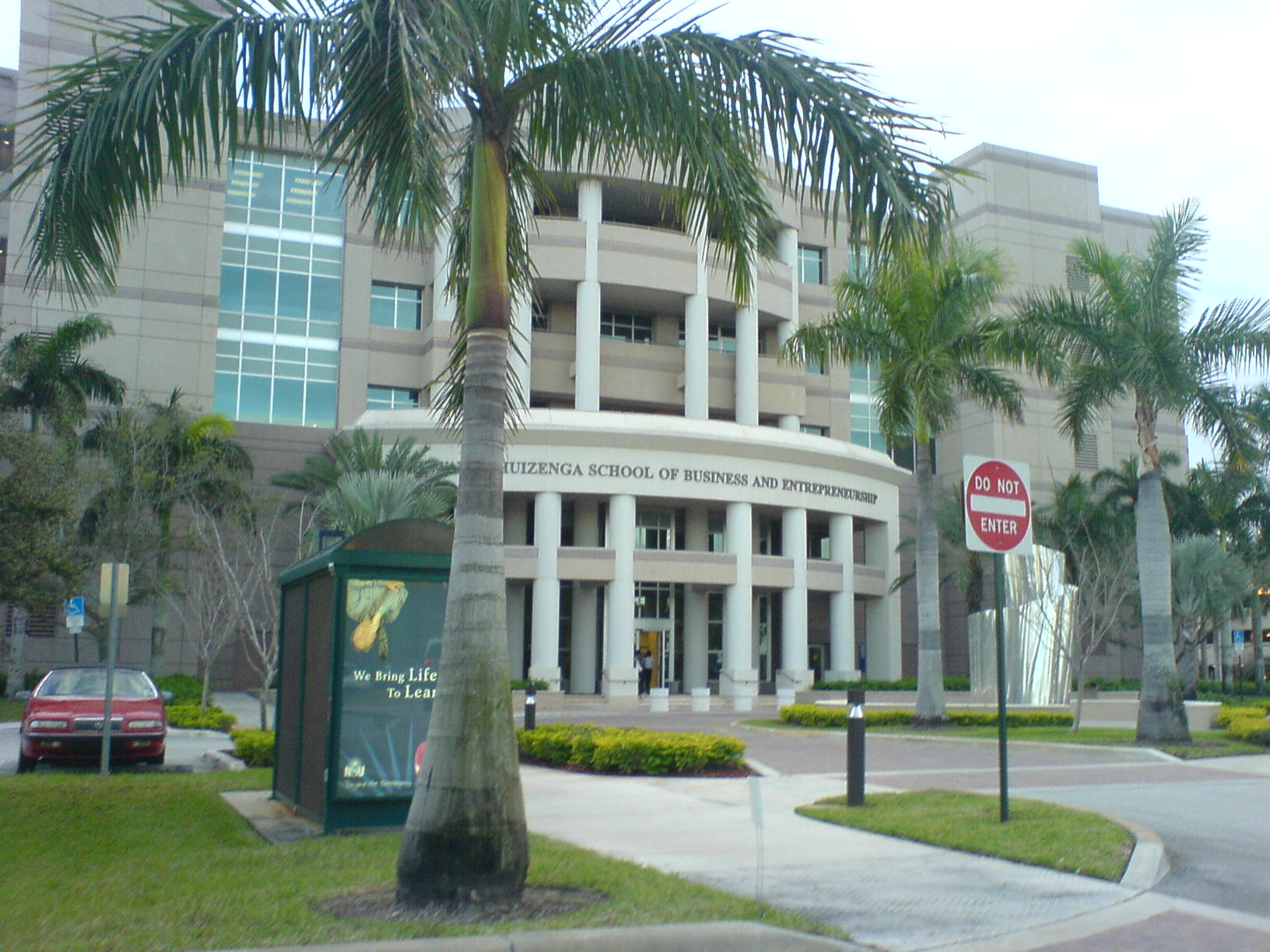
Northern view of the Carl DeSantis building

The Carl DeSantis Building houses the H. Wayne Huizenga College of Business and Entrepreneurship. It was a significant expansion to NSU and opened its doors in 2004. The design is state of the art. It includes general-purpose classrooms, compressed video/teleconferencing classrooms, a lecture theater, computer labs, multipurpose facilities, conference facilities, business services/copy center, and a full service café as well as administrative and student offices with support facilities. The café features an Einstein Bros. Bagels restaurant that is operated under a brand-licensing agreement (not under a traditional franchise arrangement).

== Notable alumni ==
- Audrey P. Marks, M.B.A., '91, Ambassador of Jamaica to the United States (former)
- George Zoley, D.P.A., Founder and CEO of GEO Group

== Past and present deans ==
- Andrew Rosman, Ph.D.
- James Simpson, Ph.D. (interim)
- J. Preston Jones, D.B.A.
- D. Michael Fields, Ph.D.
- Randolph Pohlman, Ph.D.
