= Yogen Früz =

Canadian chain of frozen yogurt and smoothie stores

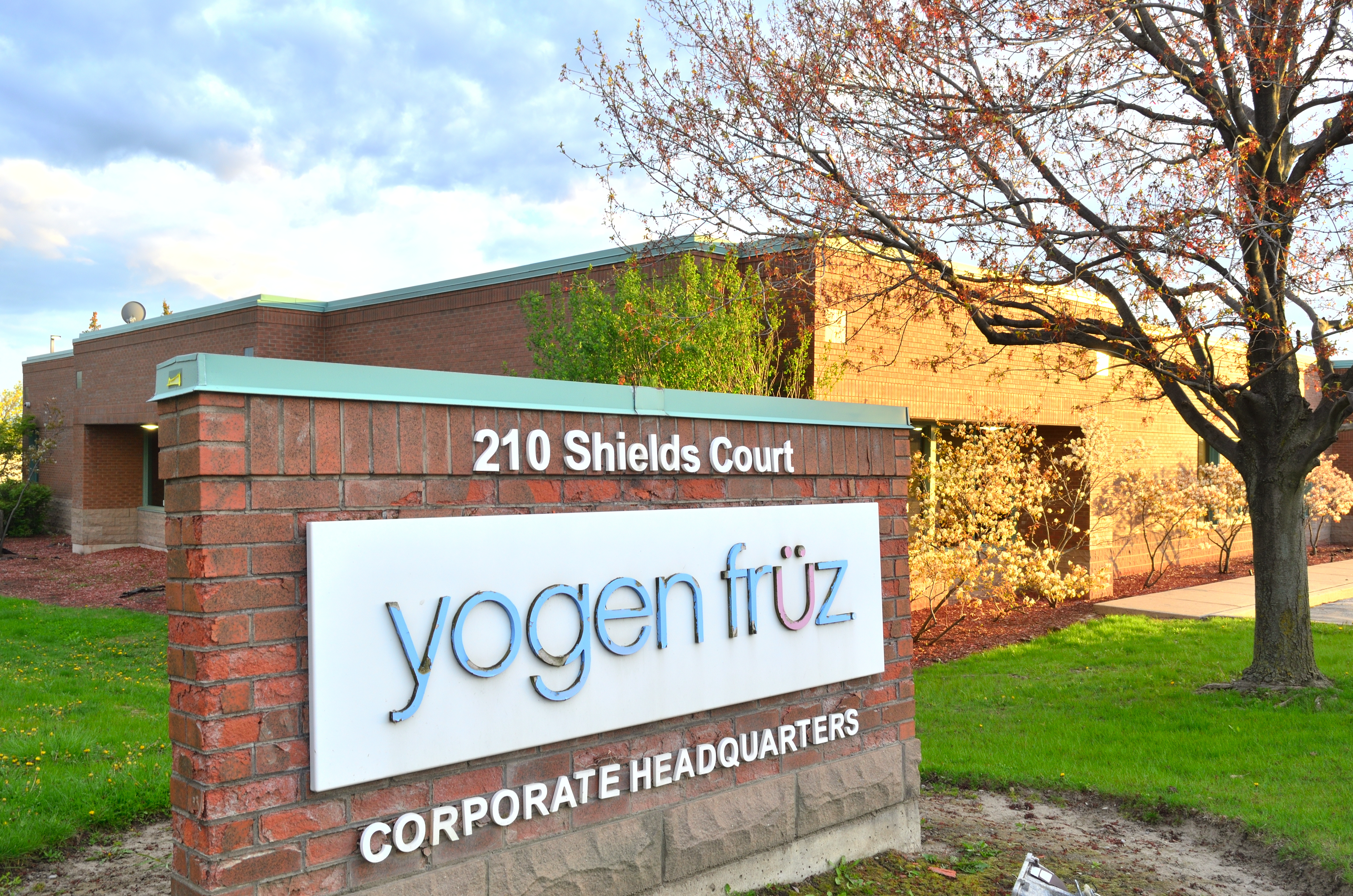
- Yogen Früz headquarters in Markham
- Type: Subsidiary
- Industry: Restaurant
- Founded: Thornhill, Ontario, Canada (1986; 40 years ago)
- Founders: Michael Serruya; Aaron Serruya
- Headquarters: Markham, Ontario, Canada
- Number of locations: over 1,300
- Products: Frozen Yogurt; Smoothie; Yogurt; Fruit Cup
- Parent: International Franchise Corp.
- Website: yogenfruz.com

Yogen Früz is a Canadian chain of frozen yogurt and smoothie stores that also serves healthy alternative food products. The chain is run through company-owned, franchised, and non-traditional partnerships. The chain operates worldwide and has its global headquarters in Markham, Ontario, in the Greater Toronto Area of Canada.

== History ==
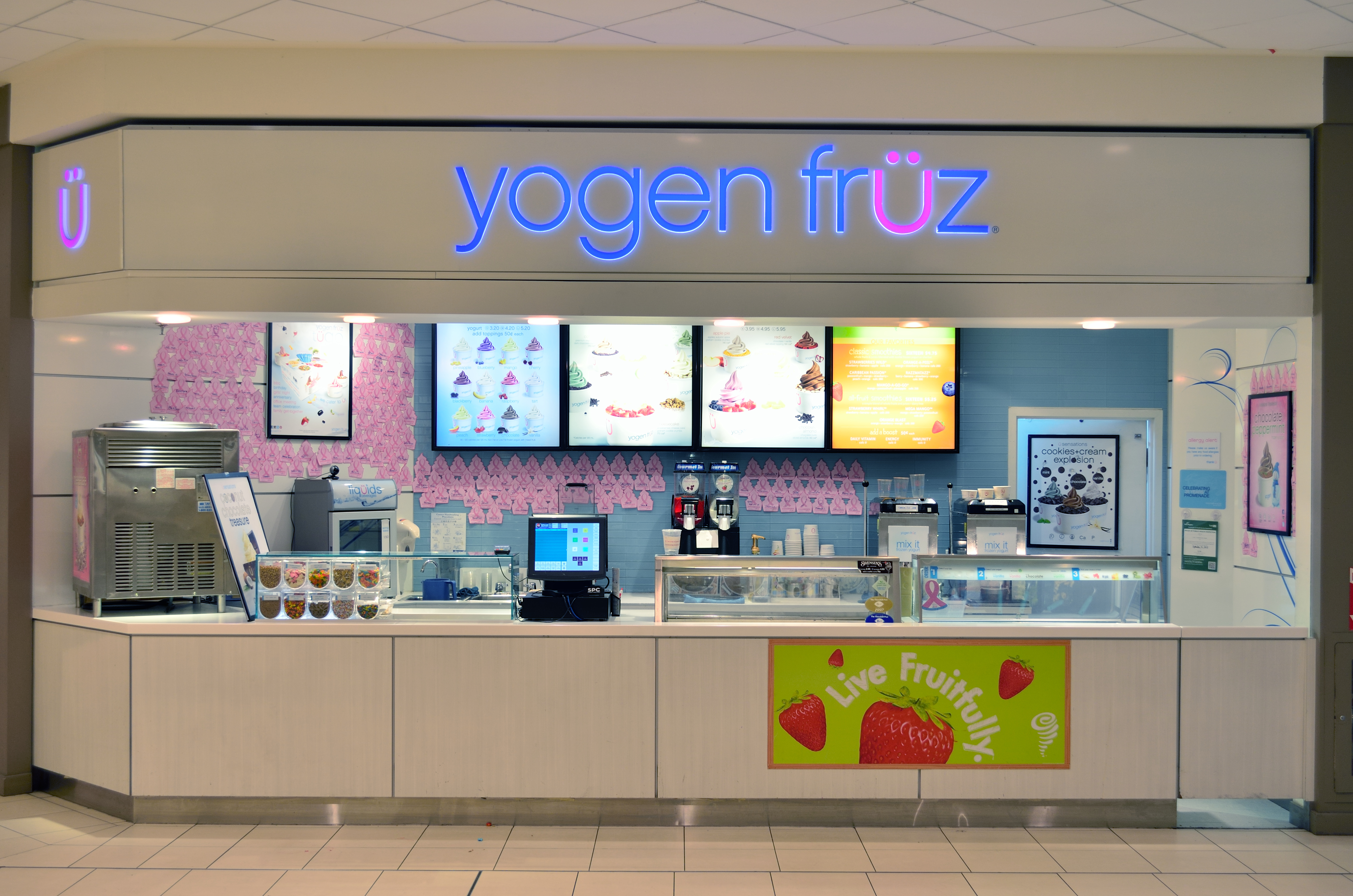
The Promenade Mall Yogen Früz store

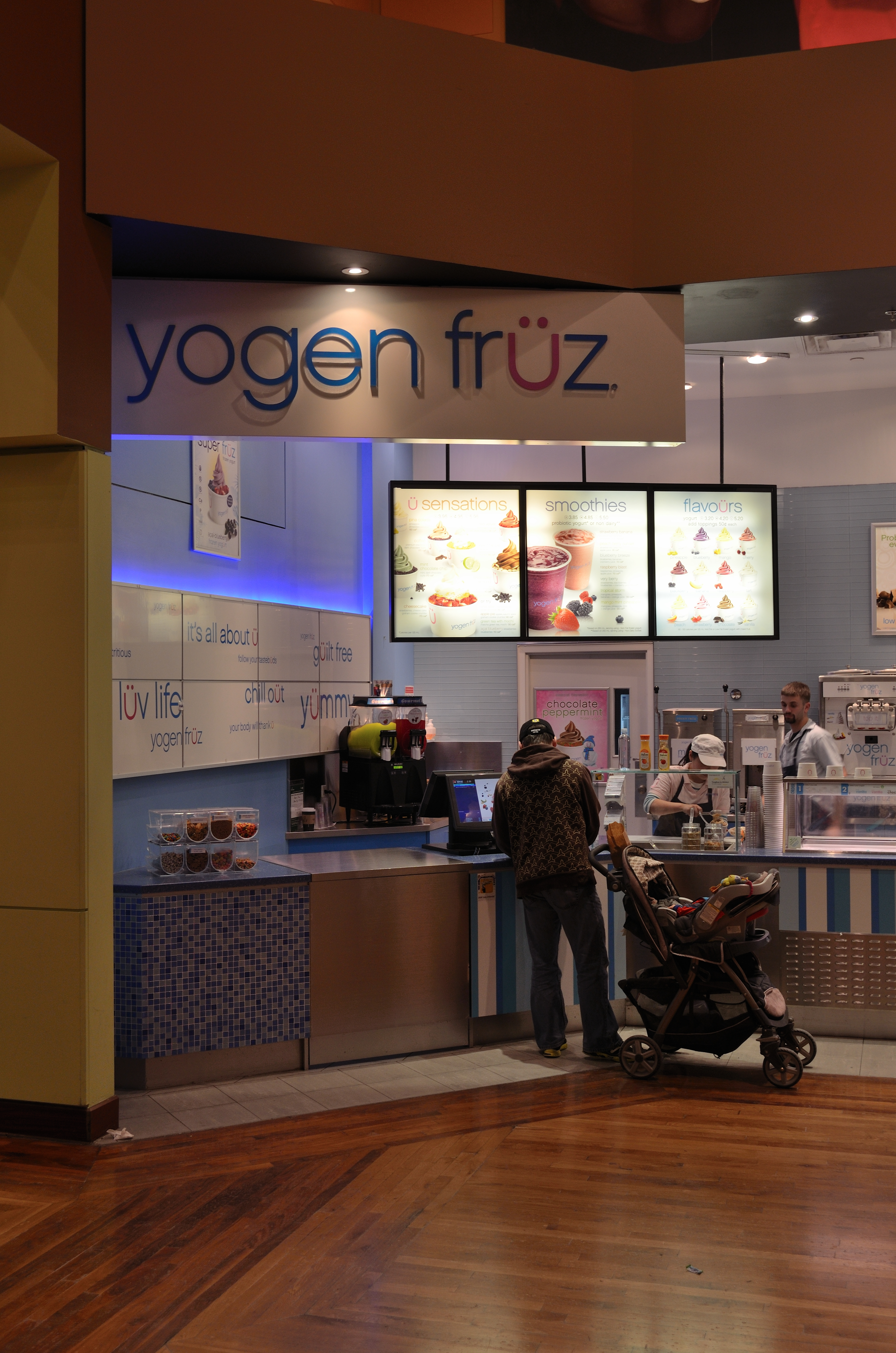
Yogen Früz in Vaughan Mills (relocated in 2014 due to the mall expansion)

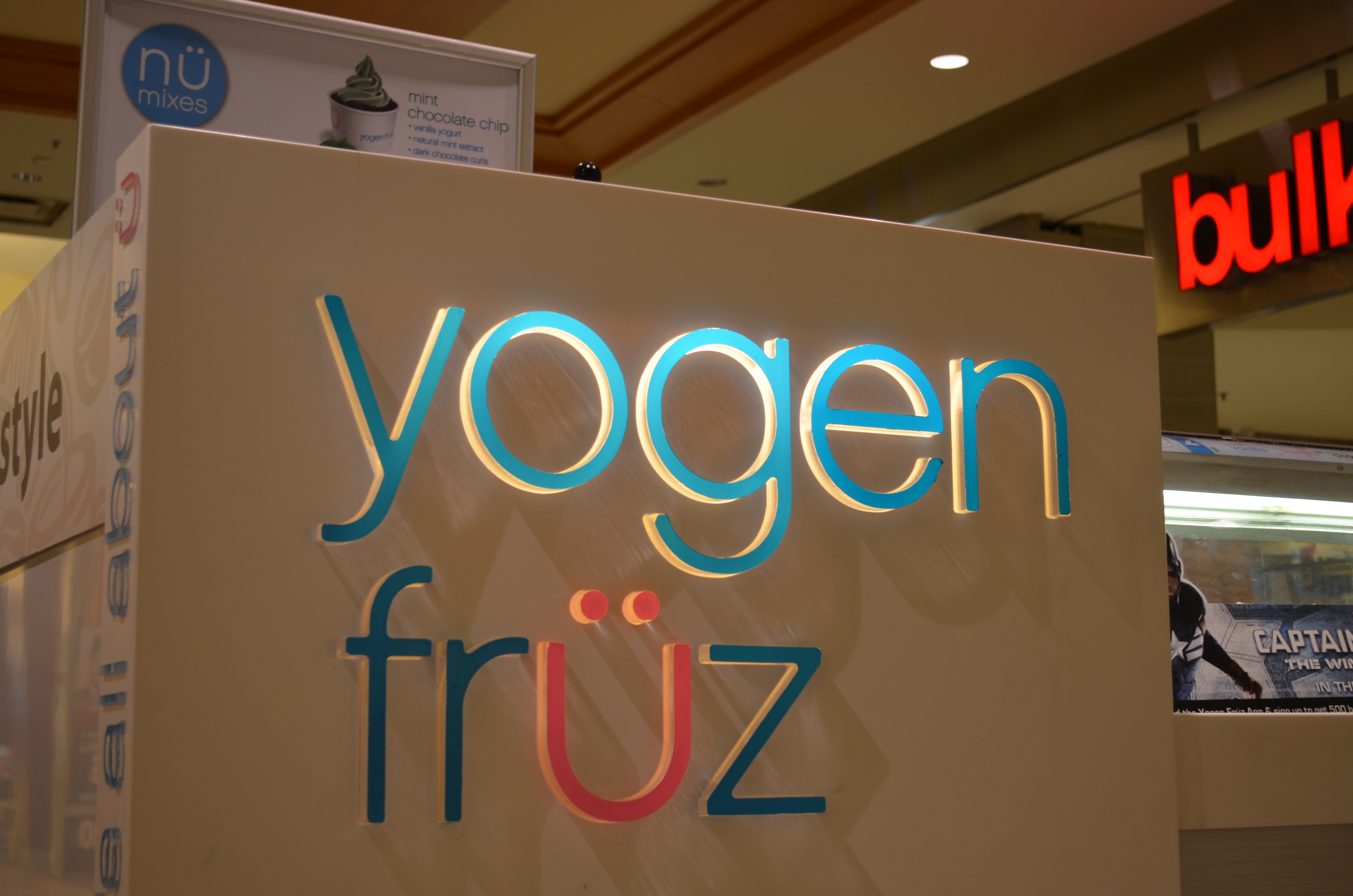
Yogen Früz at Hillcrest

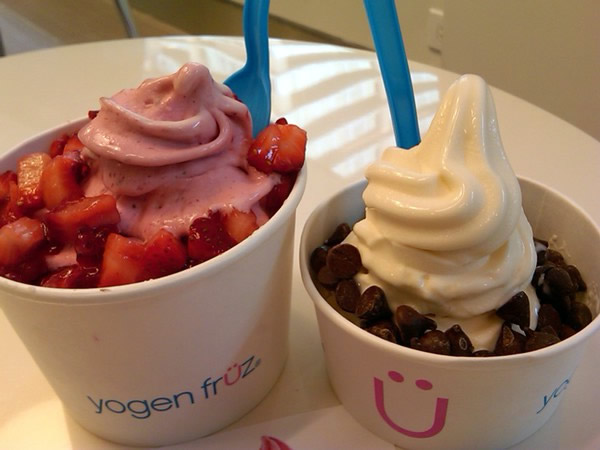
Yogen Früz Canada, Yogen Früz originally before it was globalized, is now a part of MTY Food Group.

Yogen Früz was founded in 1986 by brothers Michael Serruya and Aaron Serruya, who opened the firm's first outlet in August 1986 at The Promenade Shopping Centre in Thornhill, Ontario, Canada. The umlaut over the "u" in the store's name is an example of foreign branding.

The store offered made-to-order frozen yogurt in cups as well as frozen shakes mixed with fresh fruit; it was successful, and within a year the company's first franchises opened in London, Ontario. By 1989, Yogen Früz franchised its 100th store. A younger brother, Simon, joined the company in 1989 at the age of 18, while their father sold his typesetting business to oversee offices in Europe.

In December 2005, International Franchise Corp. acquired Yogen Früz and CoolBrands International's franchise division.

It is the largest franchiser of stores serving primarily frozen yogurt, with over 1,300 locations operating in more than 20 countries. The company aims to brand itself as a healthy-choice lifestyle product.

In 2016, Yogen Früz celebrated their 30 years in business, allowing customers to design the brand's new cup. The winner will have "their design featured on the company website and will be treated to five years' worth of free frozen yogurt or a $1,000 scholarship."

Today, the company serves proprietary probiotic frozen yogurt, both mixed with fruit and soft serve, and both dairy and non-dairy smoothies. For its standard yogurt cup, there are various base yogurt options such as low-fat and non-fat.

== Business strategy and organization ==
The firm frequently uses "master franchisees", who can obtain the rights either to open stores directly or sell franchise licenses to others. Master franchisees are granted for periods varying between ten and twenty years, and usually require the franchisee to open a minimum number of outlets each year. Additionally, the firm uses a non-traditional method of expansion involving co-branding, which allowed for the mingling of Yogen Früz products with other known food services by way of "mini-counters" in established stores. As of 2008, master franchise agreements and co-branding remain the firm's main business.

The Serruya brothers initially sought expansion overseas rather than compete in the United States, because frozen yogurt dessert shops had already neared market saturation in the United States in the 1980s, and, unlike today, the average consumer was then neither familiar with nor accepting of the taste of yogurt. In early 1995 Yogen Früz franchisees operated 170 outlets in Canada, which comprised 80 percent of the frozen yogurt market in Canada. As of 2007, Yogen Früz has over 1,200 stores operating in over 25 countries including the United States,

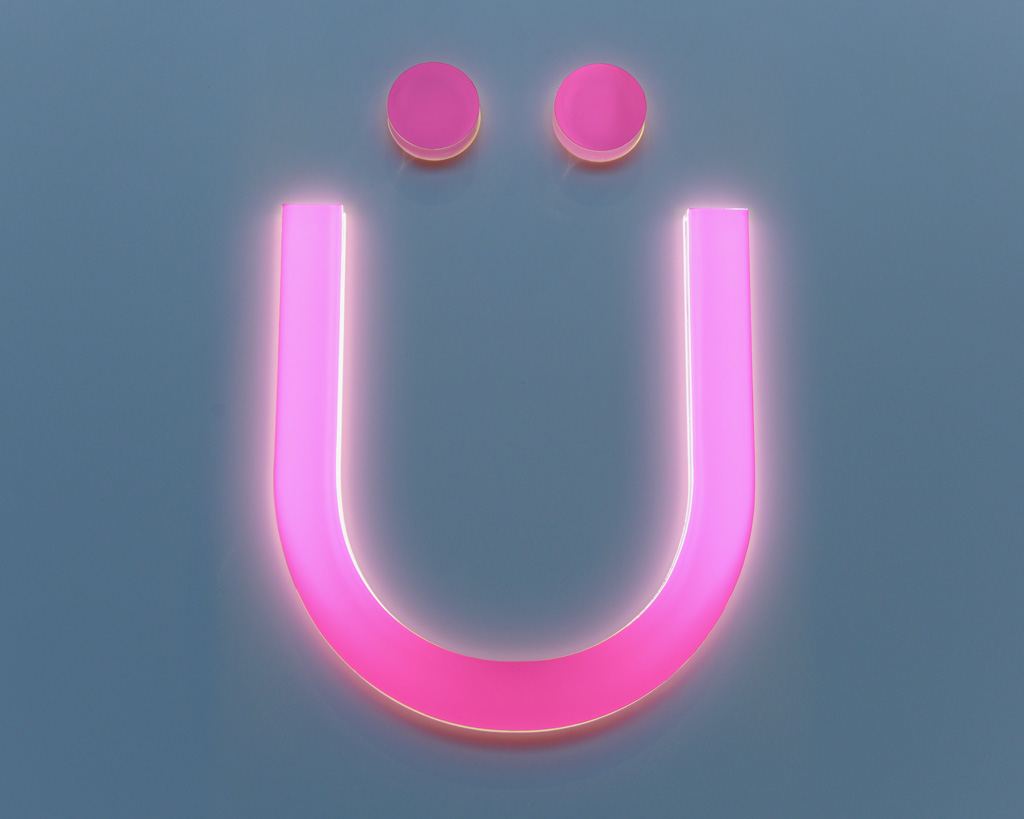
Yogen Früz smiling ü logo

In 2008, the company announced its new store design and branding, which was designed to be applied to small and large outlets in both malls and free-standing stores.

On January 14, 2010, Archeology Investments announced a master franchise agreement that grants rights to the company to open shops in Dubai, Oman, Qatar, Bahrain, and Kuwait.

== Awards and recognition ==
In 1999, the company Ranked 1st among all major franchise chains worldwide

In 2009, the company won the Frankie Award for top Web Design and Menu Board Design in Canadian franchising

== See also ==
- List of frozen yogurt companies
