= CoolBrands International =

Canadian frozen food and dessert company

- Type: Public
- Traded as: TSX: COB, COB.A
- Industry: Food specialty stores
- Founded: 1986; 40 years ago (Yogen Früz)
- Founder: Michael Serruya and Aaron Serruya
- Defunct: 2010; 16 years ago
- Fate: Acquired by Swisher Hygiene
- Headquarters: Markham, Ontario, Canada
- Key people: Michael Serruya, CEO; Richard E. Smith, Co-CEO; David J. Stein, President; David M. Smith, COO; Aaron Serruya
- Products: frozen foods, desserts
- Services: restaurant franchising
- Website: www.coolbrandsinc.com (archived)

CoolBrands International was a Canadian frozen food and dessert company based in Markham, Ontario.

Originally a frozen yoghurt vendor, CoolBrands acquired Eskimo Pie Corporation in 2000 and Chipwich in 2002. It acquired the Breyers and Light 'N Lively yoghurt brands from Kraft Foods. Under the stewardship of Michael Serruya (President and CEO), CoolBrands held exclusive long-term licenses for brands including Weight Watchers, Godiva, Tropicana, Betty Crocker, Trix, Yoo-hoo and Welch's.

The company encountered financial difficulties after losing the Weight Watchers/Smart Ones licence in 2004. In December 2005, Markham-based International Franchise Corp. acquired Yogen Früz, founded in 1986 by brothers Michael Serruya and Aaron Serruya, along with the CoolBrands franchise division which included the Swensen's ice cream restaurant chain.

By 2007, CoolBrands was selling off most or all of its core assets. In February 2007, CoolBrands sold Eskimo Pie and Chipwich to the Dreyer's division of Nestlé. Subsequently, that year, CoolBrands sold its DSD (Direct Store Delivery) business, at the time the second-largest in the United States. It sold its Whole Fruit business to J&J Snacks; it sold Breyers yoghurt (and its 175,000 square foot manufacturing facility in upstate New York) to Catterton Partners for $65 million.

Stripped of its primary operating businesses in a 2007 meltdown but still listed as a publicly traded company, the CoolBrands corporate shell was merged with Swisher Hygiene Inc. in a 2010 reverse takeover. This allowed Swisher (a money-losing sanitation company) to inherit CoolBrands's publicly listed status and balance sheet, which it used to embark on a 2011 corporate acquisition spree with many of the acquisitions paid for in company stock.
