= Serendipity =

Unplanned, fortunate discovery

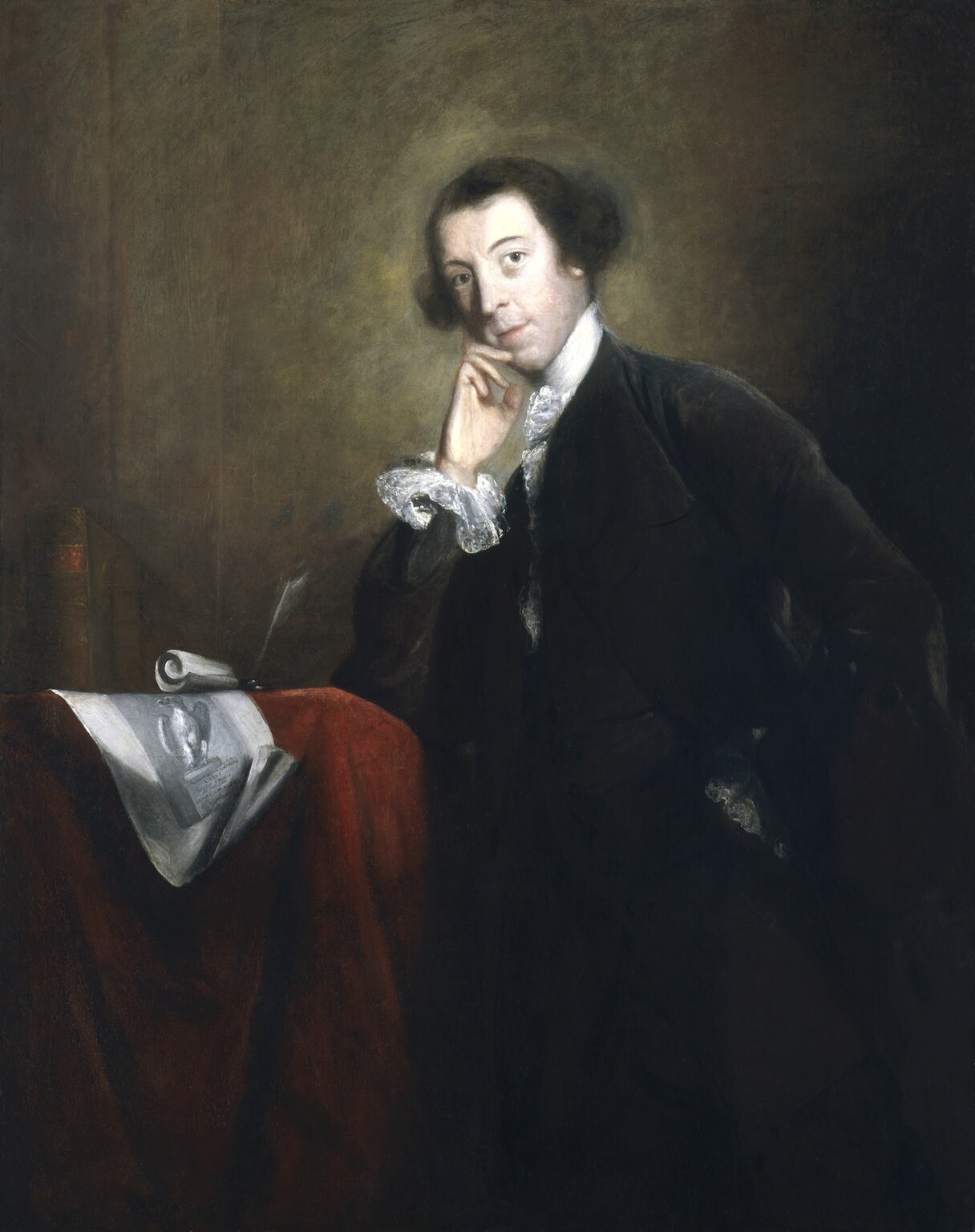
Portrait of Horace Walpole by Joshua Reynolds, 1756

Serendipity is an unplanned fortunate discovery. The term was coined by Horace Walpole in 1754, after he read a Persian fairy tale called The Three Princes of Serendip, whose heroes constantly made lucky discoveries.

The concept is often associated with scientific and technological breakthroughs, where accidental discoveries led to new insights or inventions. Many significant discoveries in history were serendipitous, including penicillin, Post-it notes, Popsicles, and the microwave oven, arising from unforeseen circumstances that were then recognized and capitalized upon.

== Definition ==
Christian Busch views serendipity as "active luck", where chance encounters and human action come together. A missed flight or a casual walk in the park can lead to new friendships, interests, or even career opportunities.

While serendipity in popular usage is often understood as a matter of pure chance, scientific discussions emphasize the crucial role of human agency—recognizing, interpreting, and acting upon unexpected opportunities. This interaction between chance and conscious action has been a key theme in areas such as creativity, leadership, innovation, and entrepreneurship.

== Etymology ==
The first noted use of "serendipity" was by Horace Walpole on 28 January 1754. In a letter he wrote to his friend Horace Mann, Walpole explained an unexpected discovery he had made about a painting of Bianca Cappello, which he recently received from Mann as a gift. The finding regarded the coat of arms of the Cappello family and was categorised by reference to a Persian fairy tale, "The Three Princes of Serendip". The princes, he told his correspondent, were "always making discoveries, by accidents and sagacity, of things which they were not in quest of." The name comes from Serendip, an old Persian name for Sri Lanka (Ceylon), hence Sarandib by Arab traders. It is derived from the Sanskrit Siṃhaladvīpaḥ (Siṃhalaḥ, Sinhalese + dvīpaḥ, island), meaning Isle of the Sinhalas. It is a corruption of the Sanskrit compound Siṃhaladvīpa ("Dwelling-Place-of-Lions Island"). The Arabs are thought to have borrowed the name from Indians with whom they traded.

The word has been exported into many other languages, with the general meaning of "unexpected discovery" or "fortunate chance".

== Applications ==
=== Inventions ===
Serendipitous inventions

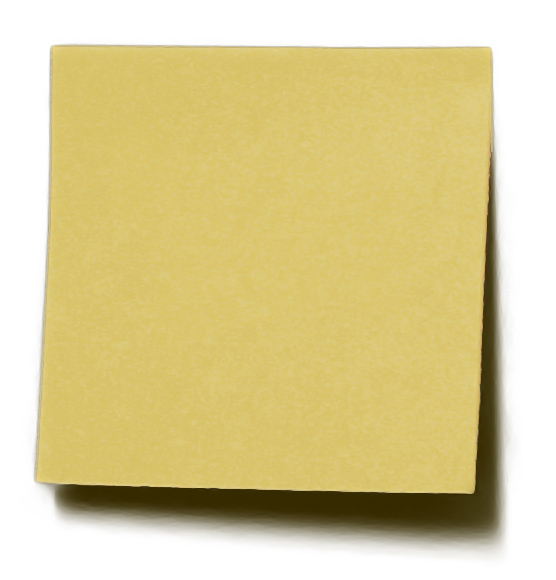
Post-it note

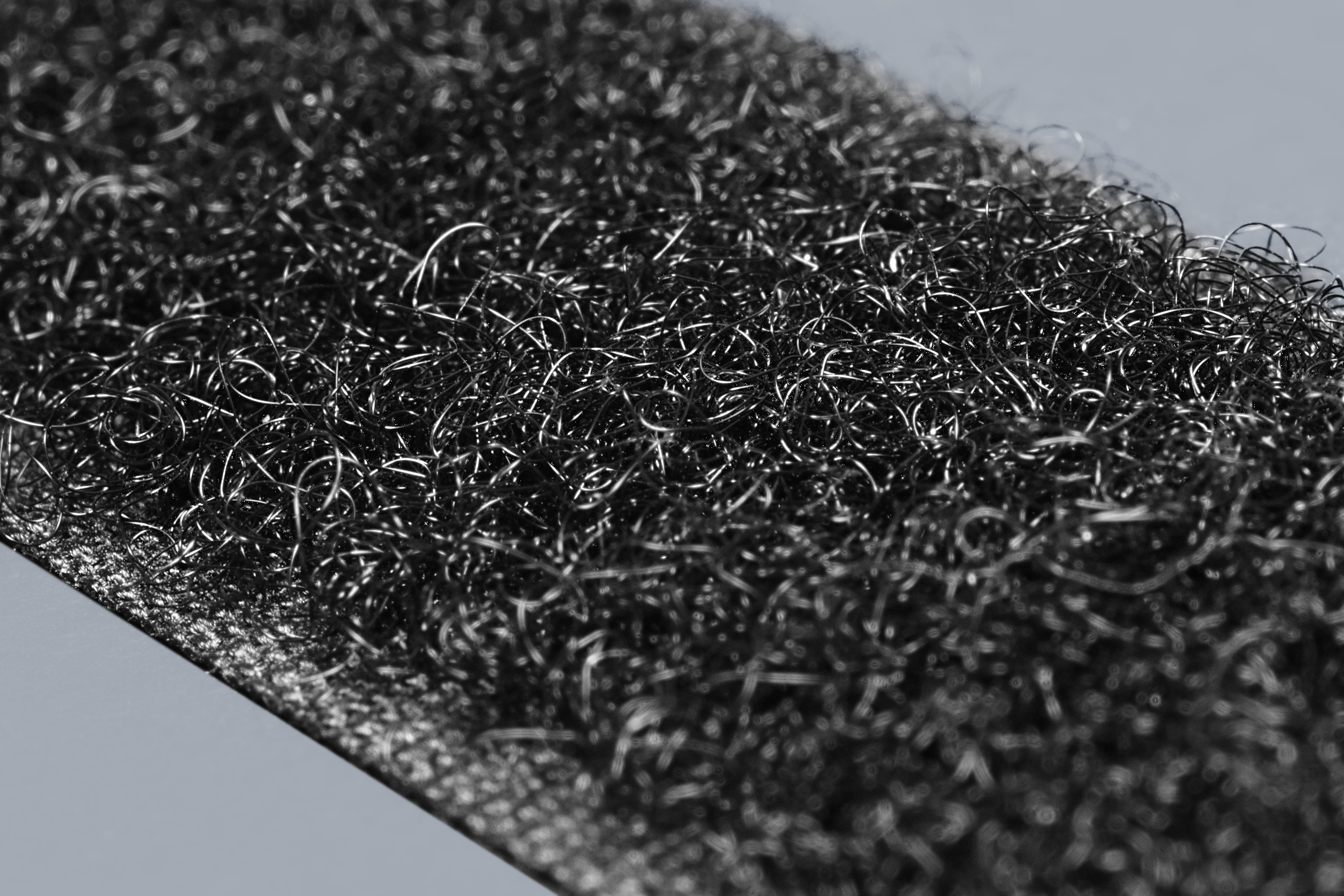
Velcro

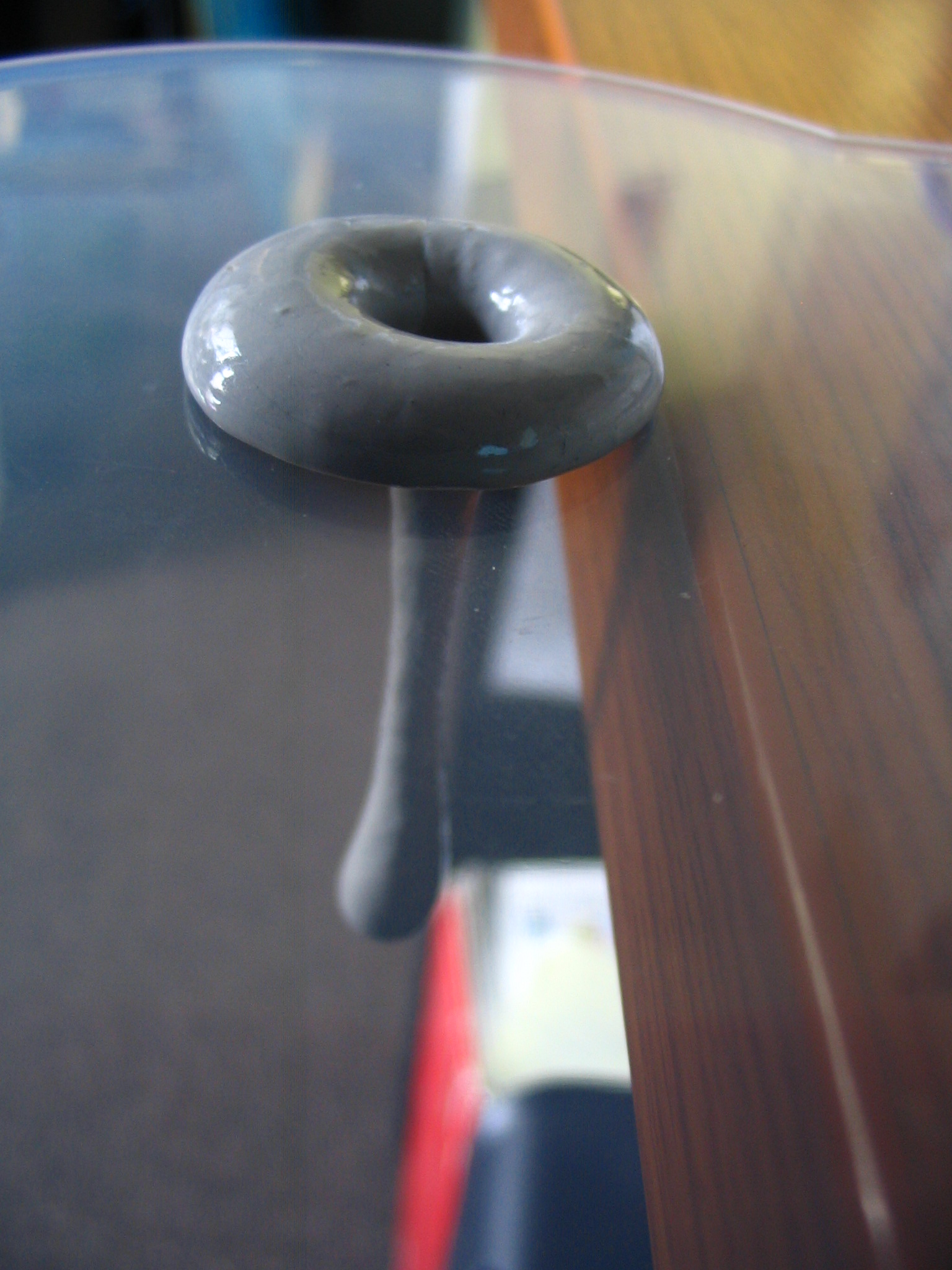
Silly Putty

Popsicle

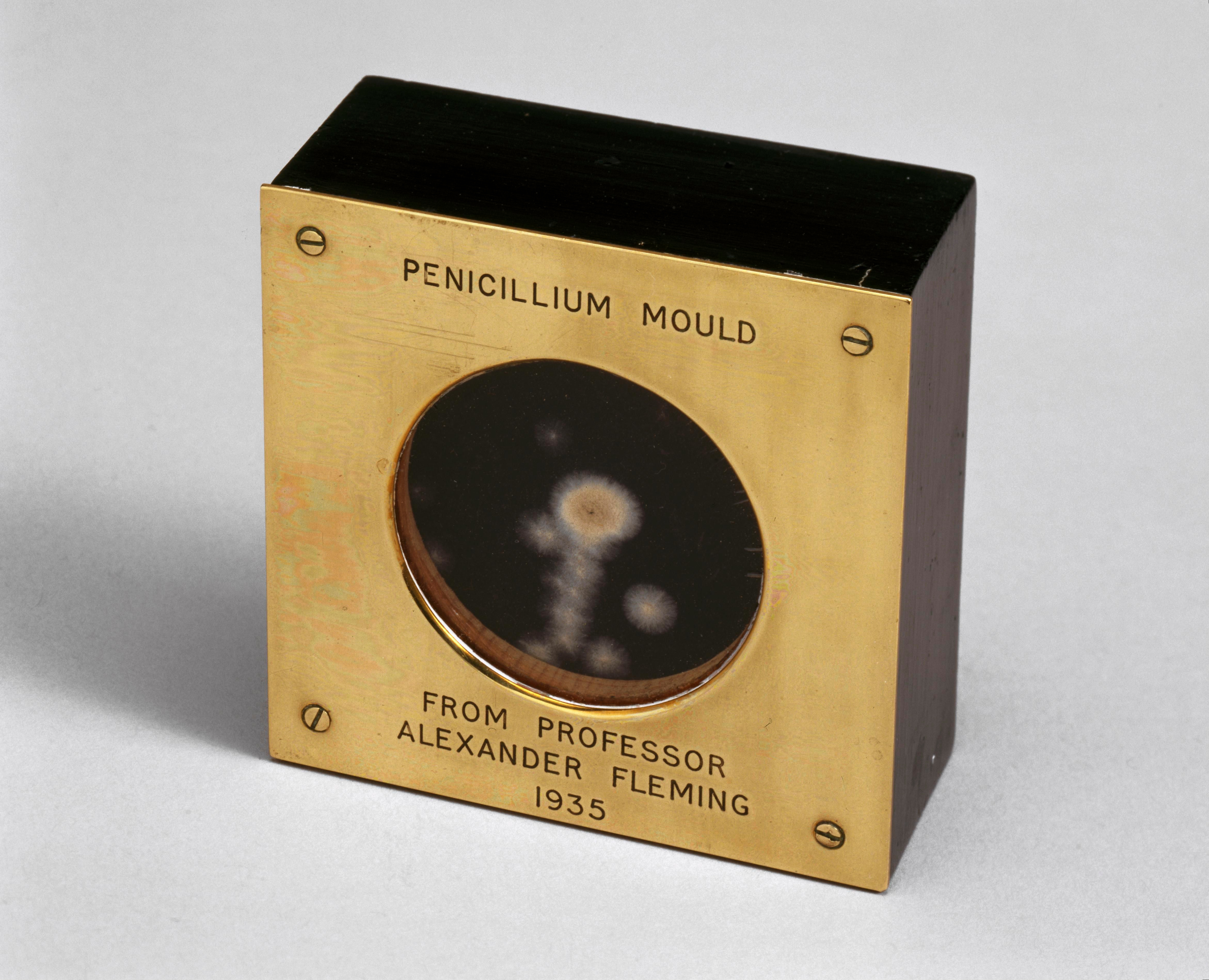
Penicillin

The term "serendipity" is often applied to inventions made by chance rather than intent. Andrew F. Smith, the editor of The Oxford Companion to American Food and Drink, has speculated that most everyday products had serendipitous roots, with many early ones related to animals. The origin of cheese, for example, possibly originated in the nomad practice of storing milk in the stomach of a dead camel that was attached to the saddle of a live one, thereby mixing rennet from the stomach with the milk stored within.

Other examples of serendipity in inventions include:

- Carbonated water was invented by Joseph Priestley, independently and by accident, in 1767 when he discovered a method of infusing water with carbon dioxide after having suspended a bowl of water above a beer vat at a brewery in Leeds, Yorkshire. He wrote of the "peculiar satisfaction" he found in drinking it, and in 1772 he published a paper entitled Impregnating Water with Fixed Air.
- Vulcanization was discovered by Charles Goodyear in 1839 when he accidentally dropped rubber mixed with sulfur on a hot frying pan. He noticed that the resulting rubber was stronger and heat-resistant.
- Corn flakes were invented in 1894 when John Harvey Kellogg unintentionally left a batch of wheat-berry dough out over night. The next day, he decided to figure out what could be done to salvage it, rather than throwing it out. John, Will, and Ella Kellogg then discerned what happened and realized that this process could be reliably recreated through a process known as tempering.
- Safety glass first originated when French chemist Édouard Bénédictus accidentally dropped a glass flask in 1903 and noticed that it did not shatter like traditional glass. He then sought to refine the material to create a safer form of glass. He named his invention "triplex" since it consisted of two layers of glass separated by a thin layer of cellulose nitrate. Benedictus patented it in 1909, and triplex later became mass-produced.
- The Popsicle, whose origins go back to San Francisco where Frank Epperson, age 11, accidentally left a mix of water and soda powder outside to freeze overnight.
- The antibiotic penicillin, which was discovered by Sir Alexander Fleming after returning from a vacation to find that a Petri dish containing staphylococcus culture had been infected by a Penicillium mold, and no bacteria grew near it.
- The predecessor to ionization smoke detectors was created by Walter Jaeger in the late 1930s when he was trying to invent a poison gas sensor, which he failed to achieve. However, he noticed that the smoke from his cigarette caused the electric current in his circuit to drop, as shown on the meter. Subsequent modifications lead to the first commercial smoke detectors.
- The polymer teflon, which Roy J. Plunkett observed forming a white mass inside a pressure bottle during an effort to make a new CFCs refrigerant.
- In 1942, super glue was first created when a team of scientists headed by Harry Coover was trying to develop clear plastic gun sights for the war effort. They stumbled upon a formulation that stuck to everything with which it came in contact. The team quickly rejected the substance for the wartime application, but in 1951, while working as researchers for Eastman Kodak, Coover and a colleague, Fred Joyner, rediscovered cyanoacrylates, and then applied for a patent in 1954 which was issued in 1956.
- The effect on humans of the psychedelic lysergic acid diethylamide (LSD) was discovered by Swiss chemist Albert Hofmann in 1943, after unintentionally ingesting an unknown amount, possibly absorbing it through his skin.
- Silly Putty, which came from a failed attempt at synthetic rubber.
- The microwave oven. Raytheon scientist Percy Spencer first patented the idea behind it after noticing that emissions from radar equipment had melted the candy in his pocket.
- The Velcro hook-and-loop fastener. George de Mestral came up with the idea after a bird hunting trip when he viewed cockleburs stuck to his pants under a microscope and saw that each burr was covered with tiny hooks.
- The Post-It Note, which emerged after 3M scientist Spencer Silver produced a weak adhesive, and a colleague used it to keep bookmarks in place on a church hymnal.
- The use of sensors to prevent automobile air bags from killing children, which came from a chair developed by the MIT Media Lab for a Penn and Teller magic show.
- In 1989, the pharmaceutical company Pfizer was looking for a treatment for high blood pressure and angina. They accidentally discovered that their experimental drug, sildenafil citrate, had unexpected side effects of increasing blood flow to certain areas of the body. In recognition of this entirely new area of marketing potential, they decided to name their drug after the side effect, evoking the ideas of "vitality" and "Niagara", and called it "Viagra".

=== Discoveries ===
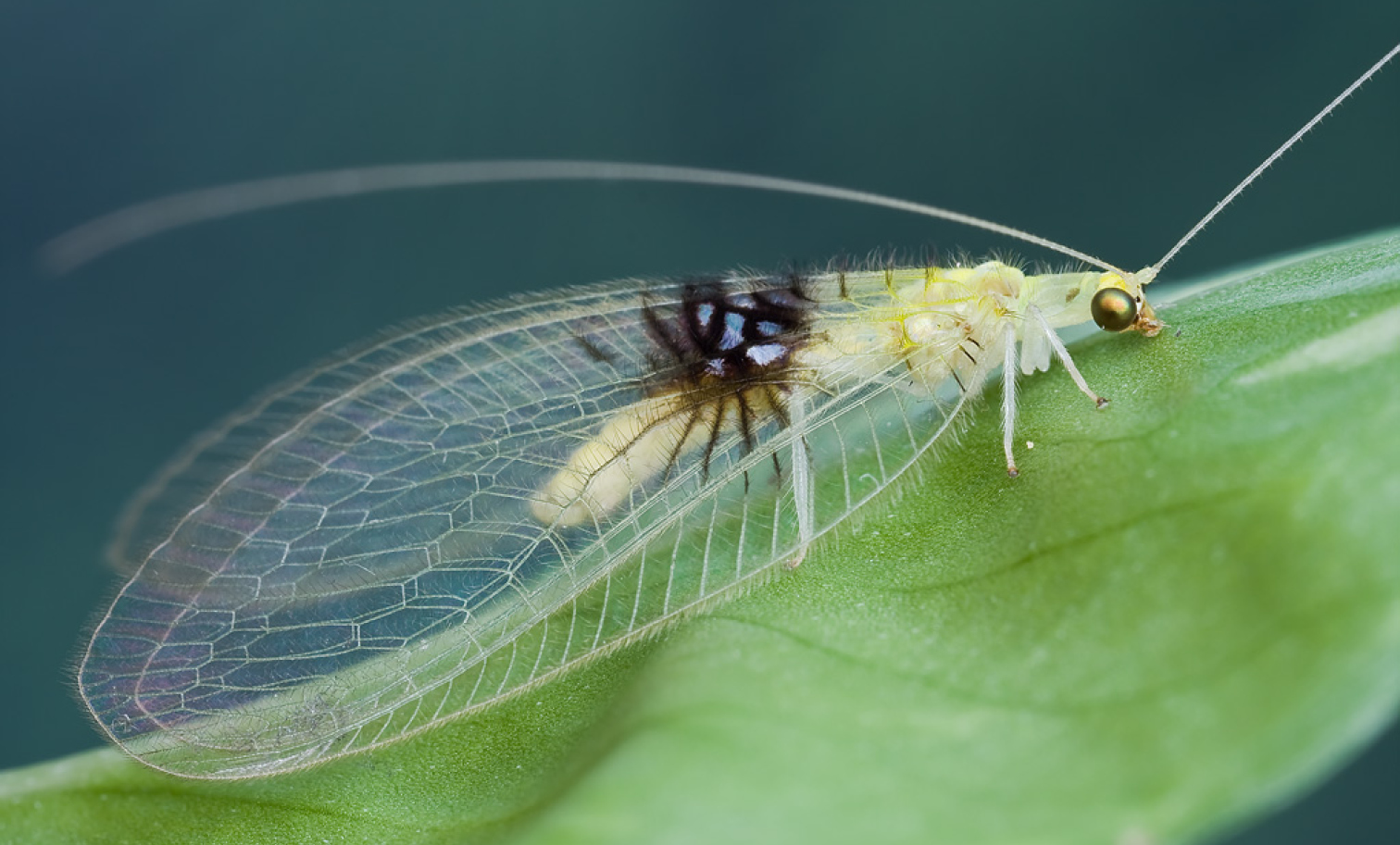
The serendipitous discovery of a new species of lacewing, Semachrysa jade, was made on Flickr.

Serendipity contributed to entomologist Shaun Winterton discovering Semachrysa jade, a new species of lacewing, which he found not in its native Malaysia, but on the photo-sharing site Flickr. Winterton's discovery was aided by Flickr's ability to present images that are personalized to a user's interests, thereby increasing the odds he would chance upon the photo. Computer scientist Jaime Teevan has argued that serendipitous discovery is promoted by such personalisation, writing that "people don't know what to do with random new information. Instead, we want information that is at the fringe of what we already know, because that is when we have the cognitive structures to make sense of the new ideas."

=== Online activity ===
Serendipity is a design principle for online activity that would present viewpoints that diverge from those participants already hold. Harvard Law professor Cass Sunstein argues that such an "architecture of serendipity" would promote a healthier democracy. Like a great city or university, "a well-functioning information market" provides exposure to new ideas, people, and ways of life. "Serendipity is crucial because it expands your horizons. You need that if you want to be free." The idea has potential application in the design of social media, information searches, and web browsing. As of the 2020s, most social media algorithms are the opposite of serendipity as they reinforce existing views within a limited "bubble" or echo chamber.

== Related terms ==
Several uncommonly used terms have been derived from the concept and name of serendipity.

William Boyd coined the term zemblanity in the late twentieth century to mean somewhat the opposite of serendipity: "making unhappy, unlucky and expected discoveries occurring by design". The derivation is speculative, but believed to be from Nova Zembla, a barren archipelago once the site of Russian nuclear testing.

Bahramdipity is derived directly from Bahram Gur as characterized in The Three Princes of Serendip. It describes the suppression of serendipitous discoveries or research results by powerful individuals.

In addition, Solomon & Bronstein (2018) further distinguish between perceptual and realised pseudo-serendipity and nemorinity.

== See also ==
- Browse
- Coincidence
- Felix culpa
- Insight
- Lateral thinking
- Multiple discovery
- Role of chance in scientific discoveries
- Serendipaceratops
- Serendipity Sapphire
- Side effect
- Synchronicity
