= Filbert's =

Chicago-based beverage manufacturer

Filbert's Old Time Sodas
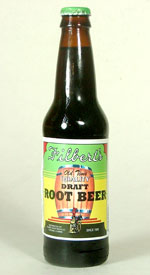
- Type: Soft Drink
- Country of origin: 1926 in Chicago, Illinois
- Related products: any other Root beer

Filbert's Old Time is a beverage company based in Chicago, Illinois. Since 1926, it has bottled and distributed soft drinks as well as non-carbonated beverages. The warehouse is located on 3430 S Ashland Ave, Chicago, IL 60608.

== History ==
Known best for its namesake root beer, Filbert's also produces 42 flavors of soda and 7 flavors of sparkling water. The company started at the turn of the century when George Filbert and family delivered milk, ice, and coal to homes in the Bridgeport neighborhood by horse-drawn wagon. The family added root beer in 1926, when it became popular during Prohibition. It was manufactured in half barrels and supplied mostly to taverns across five nearby states. Still a family business, Filbert's is run fully by Ronald Filbert.

== Flavors ==
- Banana Soda
- Black Cherry Soda
- Blue Raspberry Soda
- Blueberry Soda
- Champagne Soda
- Cherry Soda
- Cola
- Cream Soda
- Diet Cola
- Diet Root Beer
- Diet Ginger Beer
- Fruit Punch Soda
- Ginger Ale
- Ginger Beer
- Grape Soda
- Grapefruit Soda
- Lemonade Soda
- Green Apple Soda
- Lime Soda
- Mr. Newport Lemon-Lime Soda
- Orange Soda
- Orange Cream Soda
- Pineapple Soda
- Pumpkin Cream Soda
- Pumpkin Root Beer
- Pink Lemonade Soda
- Peach Soda
- Red Raspberry Soda
- Root Beer
- Strawberry Soda
- Tonic
- Watermelon Soda

== Sparkling Water Flavors ==
- Sparkling Water
- Black Cherry Sparkling Water
- Grapefruit Sparkling Water
- Lemon Sparkling Water
- Lime Sparkling Water
- Orange Cream Sparkling Water
- Pomegranate Sparkling Water

== Custom Orders ==
Filbert's is a provider of custom-packaged drinks for The Field Museum and other various organizations, and will sometimes make custom flavors for special customers.
