= Harold Price =

American businessman

- Born: c. 1909; New York City, U.S.
- Died: January 27, 2004; Beverly Hills, California, U.S.
- Education: Wharton School of the University of Pennsylvania
- Spouse: Pauline Price
- Parent: Louis Price

Harold Price (c. 1909 – January 27, 2004) was an American businessman and philanthropist. He worked for the Joe Lowe Corporation, which owned the Popsicle brand, and he was the founder of a subsidiary, Cottage Donuts, which sold frozen donuts.

== Early life ==
Price was born circa 1909 in New York City. His father, Louis, was a co-founder of the Joe Lowe Corporation.

Price graduated from the Wharton School of the University of Pennsylvania in 1928.

== Business career ==
Price began his career by working for his father's company, the Joe Lowe Corporation. The company owned the Popsicle brand, and it supplied bakeries and ice cream parlors.

In 1938, Price founded a subsidiary, Cottage Donuts, which sold frozen donuts. It eventually "sold 100,000 dozen doughnuts a day produced at 19 plants" across the United States. During World War II, Price served on the War Production Board.

Price merged the Joe Lowe Corporation with the Consolidated Foods Corp in 1965. It later merged with Sara Lee Corporation.

== Philanthropy ==
Price was a donor to his alma mater, the Wharton School of the University of Pennsylvania, as well as New York Stern School of Business. With his wife, he is the namesake of the Harold and Pauline Price Center for Entrepreneurship & Innovation at the UCLA Anderson School of Management.

== Personal life and death ==
With his wife Pauline, Price resided in Beverly Hills, California.

Price died on January 27, 2004, in Beverly Hills, at 95.
