= SnoBar Cocktails =

- Alcohol infused Margarita Ice Pop

Website
- http://www.SnoBarCocktails.com

SnoBar Cocktails is a line of alcohol-infused ice cream and ice-pops that launched in Arizona on December 9, 2011. In January 2012, the company announced plans to be available at pools in Las Vegas by the summer. In 2022 they were said to be a "key player" in the frozen cocktails market.

== Alcohol content ==
With a pure alcohol content range of 3.59 to 6.41 percent (8.22 to 14.67 alc/vol), each serving of SnoBar ice-pops and ice cream has the equivalent alcohol percentage of a full cocktail. The amount of alcohol in the drink varies by the drink ordered.
