= Tongue depressor =

Medical tool

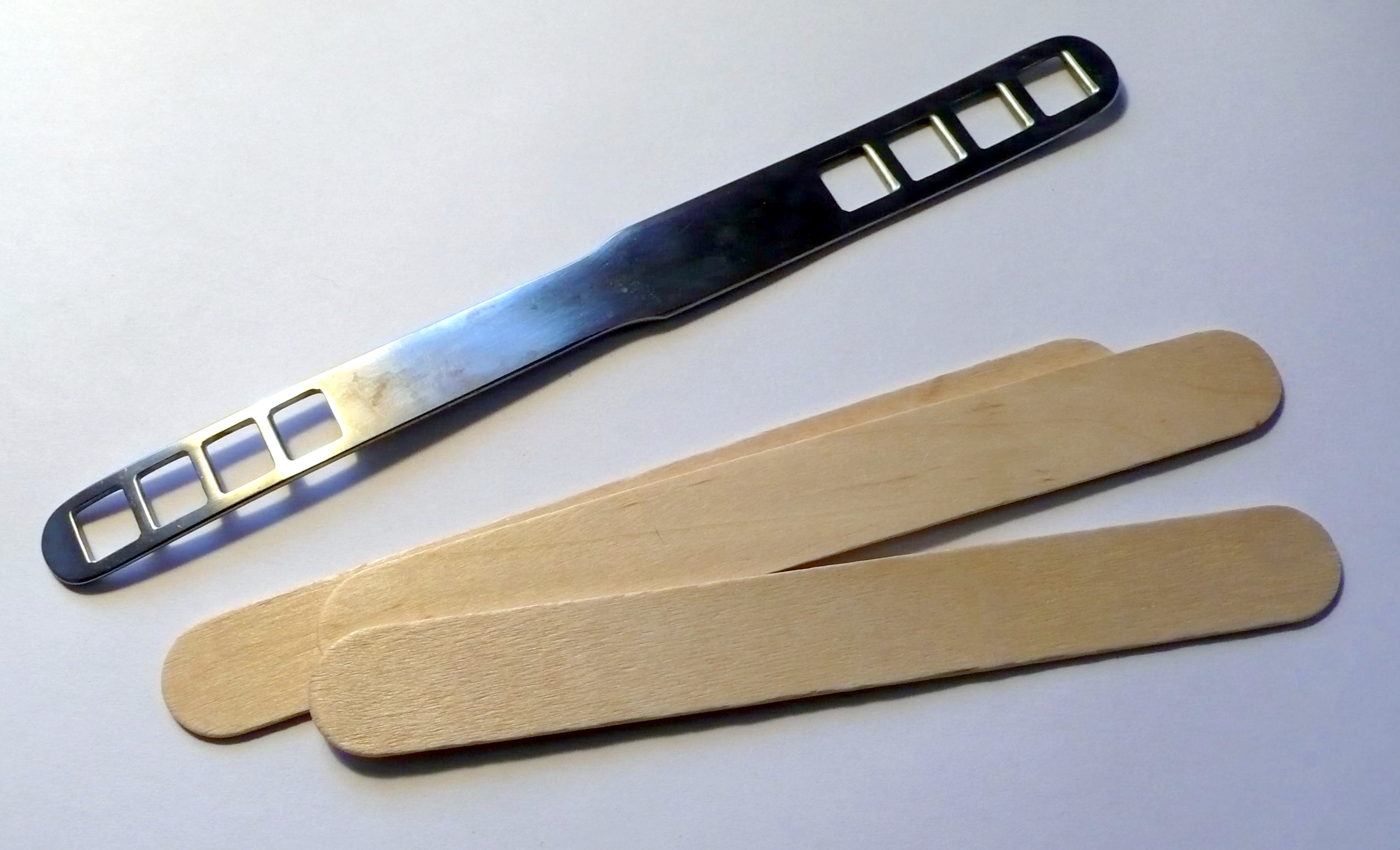
Tongue depressor

A tongue depressor or spatula is a tool used in medical practice to depress the tongue to allow for examination of the mouth and throat. Hobbyists, artists, teachers and confectionery makers use tongue depressors, which may also be referred to as craft sticks or popsicle sticks.

== Description ==
A tongue depressor is a tool used in medical practice to depress the tongue to allow for examination of the mouth and throat. For this use, it is also known as a spatula.

== History ==
Earlier versions of depressors were made from balsa, pine, or redwood woods. Tongue depressors made from wood and metal exist from the American Civil War.

The most common modern tongue depressors are flat, thin, wooden blades, smoothed and rounded at both ends, but, historically, tongue depressors have been made of a variety of materials. Since they are inexpensive and difficult to clean because of their porous texture, wooden tongue depressors are labeled for disposal after a single usage.

== Other uses ==
Ice pops and ice cream bars have used wooden tongue depressors to hold the confection, leading to the name popsicle sticks. Hobbyists, artists and teachers use wooden tongue depressors in sculptural projects, which has led to the name craft sticks.
