= Ice pop =

Frozen confection on a stick

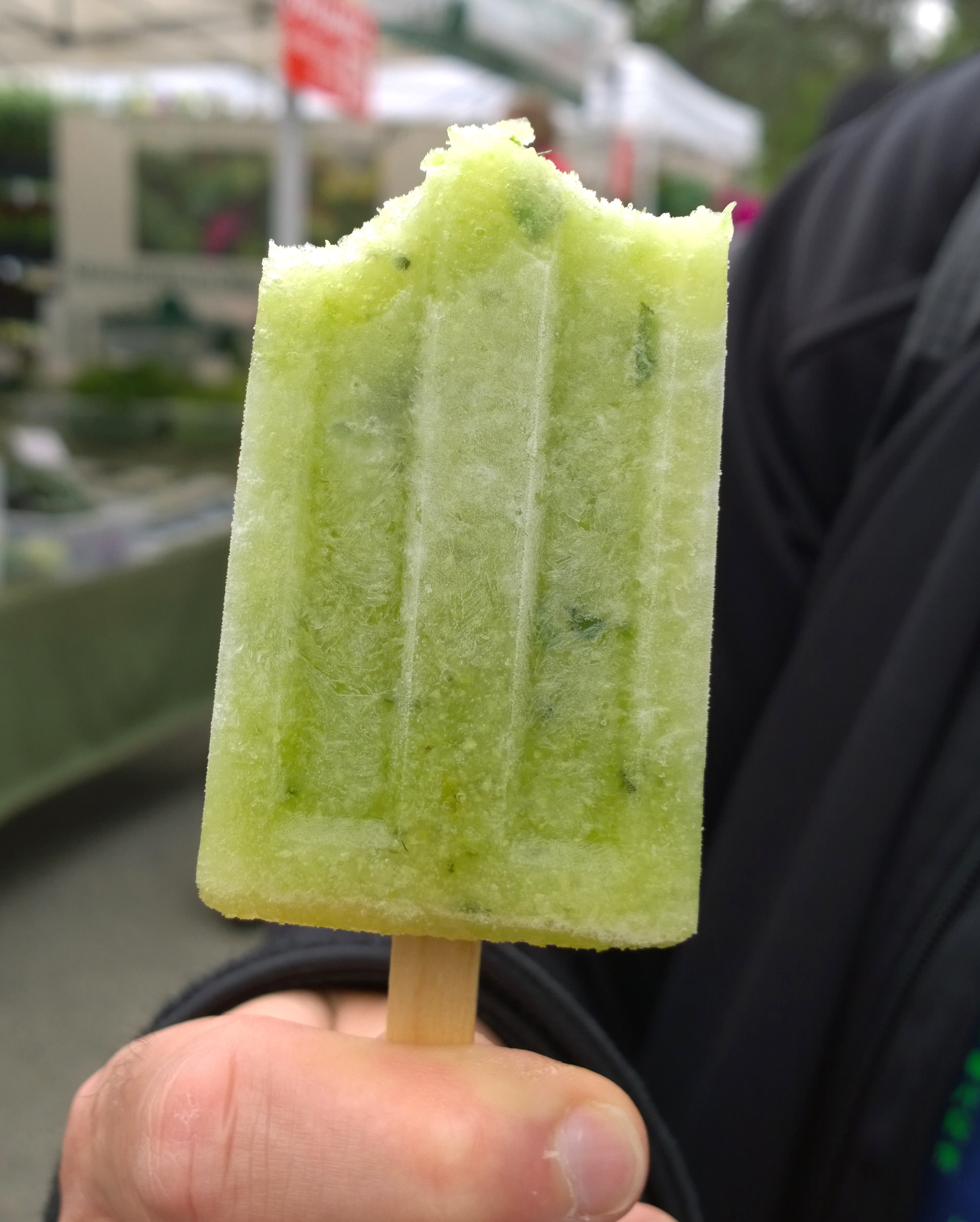
- A cucumber, elderflower and mint ice pop
- Alternative names: Popsicle, paleta, ice lolly, icy pole, ice block, ice drop, ice gola, ice candy
- Type: Frozen dessert
- Place of origin: United States
- Region or state: California
- Created by: Frank Epperson
- Main ingredients: Water/milk and flavoring (such as fruit juices or chocolate ice cream)
- Food energy (per serving): 200 kcal (840 kJ)

An ice pop is a liquid/cream-based frozen dessert on a stick. Unlike ice cream or sorbet, which are whipped while freezing to prevent ice crystal formation, an ice pop is frozen while at rest, becoming a solid block of ice with an icy texture. It is a fusion of flavored liquid, like juice or a sweetened water-based liquid. The stick is used as a handle to hold it. Without a stick, the frozen product would be a freezie. It can be calorie restricted, but commercial options usually contain added sugars, corn syrup and artificial ingredients.

An ice pop is also referred to as a popsicle (a generic trademark) in Canada and the United States, an ice lolly, lollipop or lolly in the United Kingdom and Ireland, an ice block in New Zealand, an icy pole in Australia, an ice drop in the Philippines, an ice gola in India, ice candy in the Philippines, India and Japan, ai tim tang or ice cream tang in Thailand, and a kisko in the Caribbean.

== History ==
As early as 1872, a partnership known as Ross and Robins sold "a frozen-fruit confection on a stick, which they called the Hokey-Pokey." Later, Francis William "Frank" Epperson of Oakland, California, popularized ice pops after patenting the concept of "frozen ice on a stick" in 1923.

Epperson claimed to have first created an ice pop in 1905, at the age of 11, when he accidentally left a glass of powdered lemonade soda and water with a mixing stick in it on his porch during a cold night, a story still printed on the back of Popsicle treat boxes. Epperson lived in Oakland and worked as a lemonade salesman.

In 1922, Epperson, a realtor with Realty Syndicate Company in Oakland, introduced the Popsicle at a fireman's ball. The product became an instant hit. In 1923, at the age of 29, Epperson received a patent for his "Epsicle" ice pop, and by 1924, had patented all handled, frozen confections or ice lollipops. He officially debuted the Epsicle in seven fruit flavors at Neptune Beach amusement park, marketed as a "frozen lollipop", or a "drink on a stick". A couple of years later, Epperson sold the rights to the invention and the Popsicle brand to the Joe Lowe Company in New York City.

== Terminology ==
In the United States and Canada, frozen ice on a stick is frequently referred to as a popsicle due to the early popularity of the Popsicle brand, despite the fact that it is a registered trademark of Unilever. The word is a portmanteau of pop and icicle; the word is so common that there are decades-old derived slang meanings such as "popsicle stand". The term ice pop is also used in the United States.

In Ireland, the term ice pop is predominantly used. In the United Kingdom, the term ice lolly is used to refer to ice pop while the term ice pop refers to a freezie (flavoured ice inside a tube). The term chihiro is used as a slang term in the Cayman Islands, partially derived from chill. Different parts of Australia use either ice block or icy pole (which is a brand name), and New Zealand uses ice block. In the Philippines, the term ice drop is used with coconut flavor ice pops being called ice bukos. India uses the terms ice gola and ice candy. In Japan the term ice candy is used.

=== Paleta ===
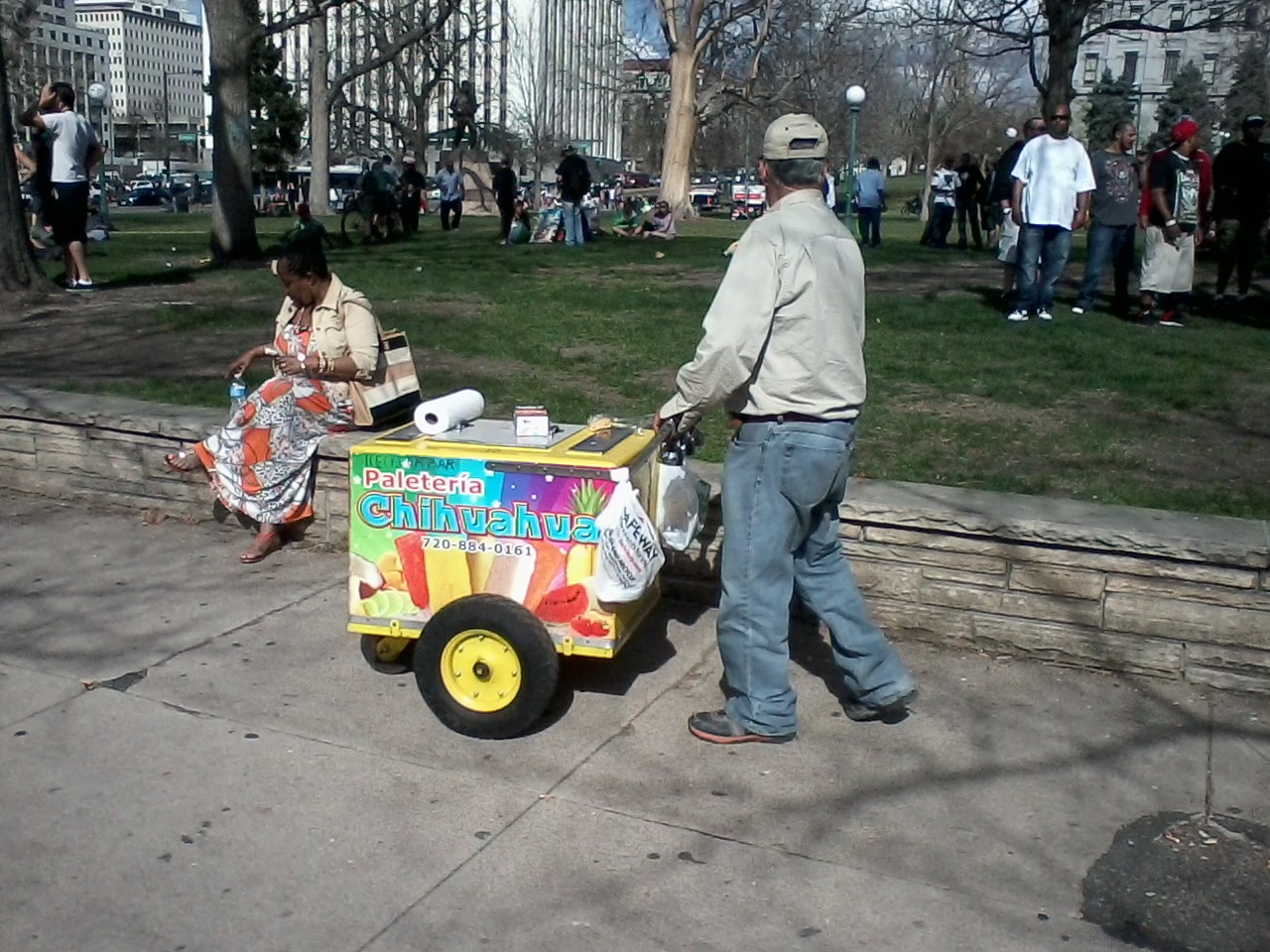
A paletero in Denver, Colorado

In Mexico, ice pops are known as paletas ("little paddles") sold in the streets by a paletero (roughly equivalent to the English "ice cream man") usually from a pushcart labeled with the name of the enterprise that makes them (paletería). Today, many paleteros are now commonly found in American cities with significant Mexican populations. Vending requirements for paleteros vary widely by city.

After a trip to the United States in the early 1940s, Ignacio Alcázar returned to his home city of Tocumbo, Michoacán, bringing the idea to manufacture paletas using locally available fresh fruit. He and some family members expanded by opening a shop in Mexico City which became very popular and he began to franchise Paletería La Michoacana to friends and family from his town. The popularity of paletas and association with Tocumbo has increased to the status of a national Mexican food.

Paleta flavors can be divided into two basic categories: milk-based or water-based. The composition of each flavor may vary, but the base is most often from fresh fruit. Paleterias usually have dozens of flavors of paleta including local flavors like horchata, tamarind, mamey and nanche along with other flavors like strawberry, lime, chocolate and mango. Distinctly Mexican ingredients like chili pepper, chamoy, and vanilla are often present in these paletas. Paleterias adapt their flavors to the tastes of the community and local availability of ingredients.

== Homemade ice pops ==
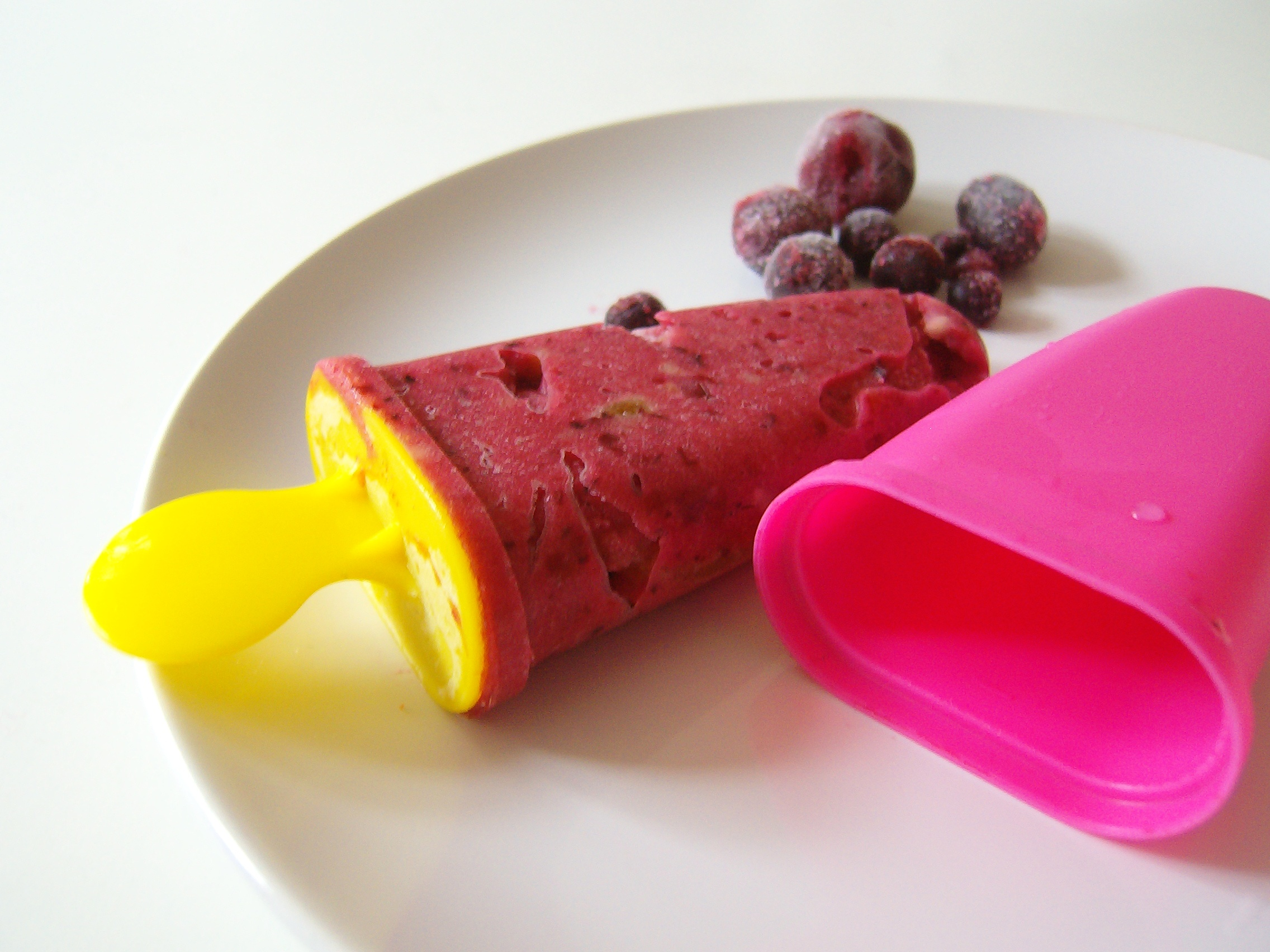
A homemade ice pop made using a plastic mold

An alternative to the store-bought ice pops is making them at home using fruit juice, drinks, or any freezable beverage. A classic method involves using ice cube trays and toothpicks, although various ice pop freezer molds are also available.

In the UK, there is an increasing number of people making alcoholic ice lollies at home by putting alcoholic drinks inside the mould. Buckfast, Kopparberg and Strongbow Dark Fruit ciders are popular choices used.

== Innovations in ice pop creation ==
In 2018, the UK food-focused design firm called Bompas & Parr announced that they had created the world's first 'non-melting' ice pop. The ice pop does melt but not as fast as other ice pops. This is due to the strands of fruit fibers inside the ice pops which makes them thicker than regular ice pops. The thicker the ice pop the slower it melts.

== World record ice pop ==
On June 22, 2005, Snapple tried to beat the existing Guinness World Records entry of a 1997 Dutch 21-foot (6.4 m) ice pop by attempting to erect a 25-foot (7.6 m) ice pop in New York City. The 17.5 short tons (15.9 t) of frozen juice that had been brought from Edison, New Jersey, in a freezer truck melted faster than expected, dashing hopes of a new record. Spectators fled to higher ground as firefighters hosed away the melted juice.

== See also ==
- Creamsicle
- Freezie—a.k.a. ice pole, similar to an ice pop, but without the stick
- Ice cream
- Ice cream bar—similar to an ice pop, but made with ice cream
- Lollipop
- Sorbet
