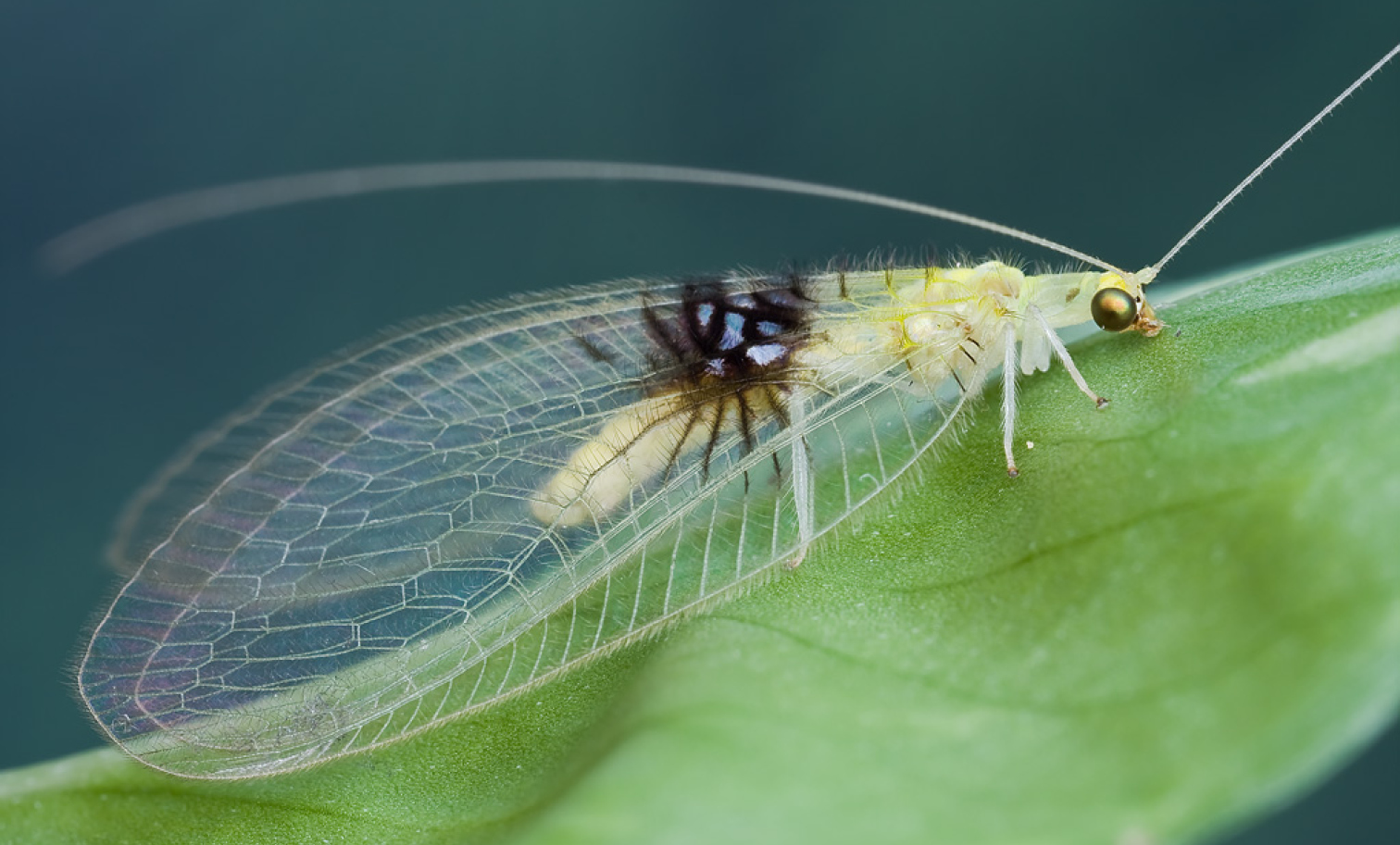
- Semachrysa jade female

Scientific classification
- Kingdom: Animalia
- Phylum: Arthropoda
- Clade: Pancrustacea
- Class: Insecta
- Order: Neuroptera
- Family: Chrysopidae
- Subfamily: Chrysopinae
- Tribe: Ankylopterygini
- Genus: Semachrysa; Brooks, 1983

= Semachrysa =

Genus of lacewings

Semachrysa is a genus of green lacewing found from Japan to Australia along the Western part of the Pacific Ocean. 20 Semachrysa species have been described between 1914 and 2012. 15 of them - one of which was new - have been included in a recent taxonomic study:

- Semachrysa claggi (Banks, 1937)
- Semachrysa contorta Brooks, 1983
- Semachrysa cruciata (Esben-Petersen, 1928)
- Semachrysa dammermanni (Esben-Petersen, 1929)
- Semachrysa decorata (Esben-Petersen, 1913)
- Semachrysa hyndi Brooks, 1983
- Semachrysa jade Winterton & Guek & Brooks, 2012
- Semachrysa matsumurae (Okamoto, 1914)
- Semachrysa minuta Brooks, 1983
- Semachrysa nigribasis (Banks, 1920)
- Semachrysa papuensis Brooks, 1983
- Semachrysa picilabris (Kimmins, 1952)
- Semachrysa polysticta Brooks, 1983
- Semachrysa sagitta Brooks, 1983
- Semachrysa wallacei Brooks, 1983

Further members include:

- Semachrysa guangxiensis Yang & Yang, 1991
- Semachrysa phanera (Yang, 1987)
- Semachrysa polystricta Yang & Wang, 1994
- Semachrysa pulchella Tsukaguchi, 1995
- Semachrysa yananica Yang & Yang, 1989
