= La Michoacana (ice cream) =

Mexican ice cream parlor chain

La Michoacana (Ice Cream Parlor)
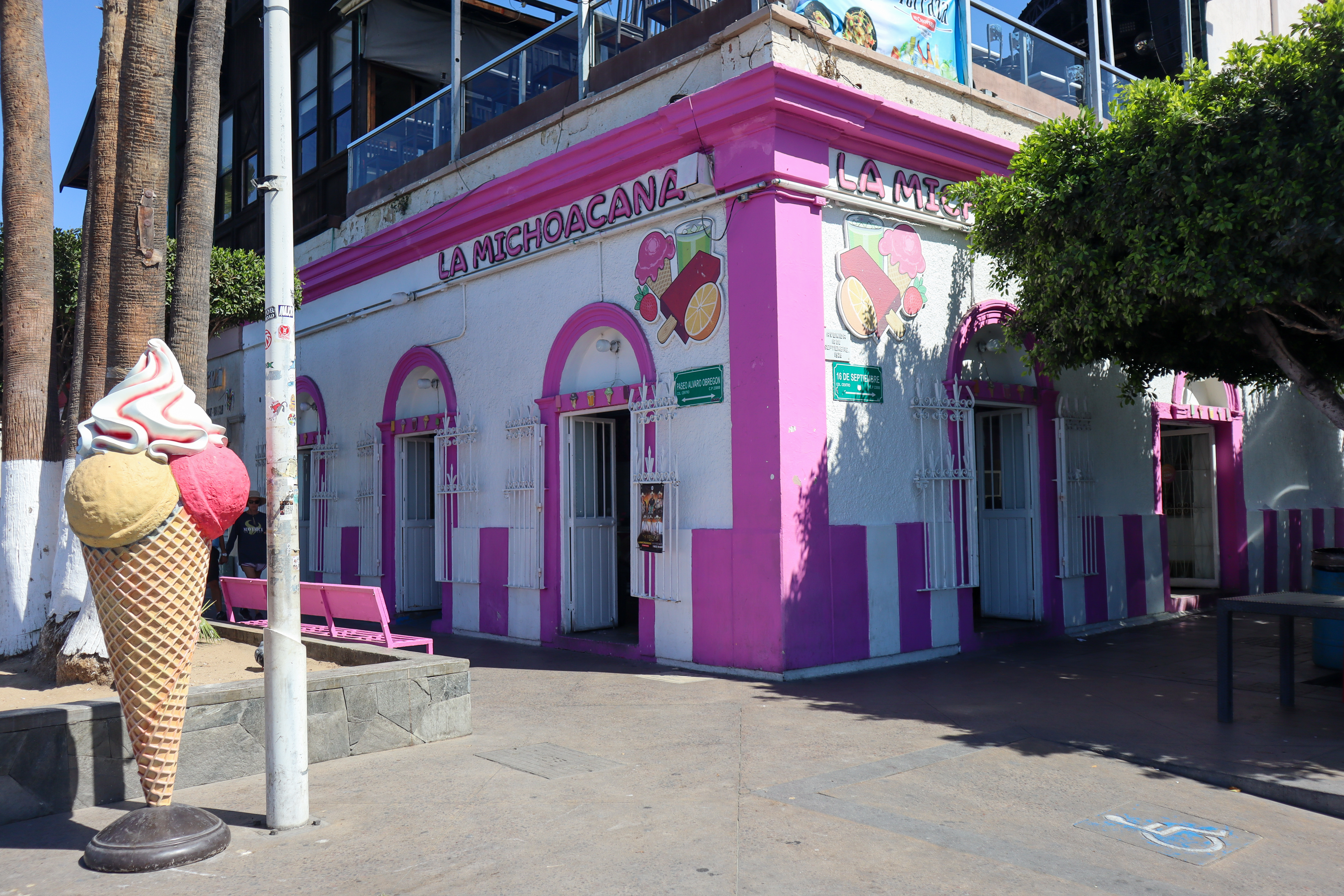
- Shop in La Paz, Baja California Sur
- Company type: Subsidiary
- Industry: Retail
- Founded: Helados La Michoacana 1930; 96 years ago in Tocumbo, Michoacán. Paleterias La Michoacana: 1942; 84 years ago La Nueva Michoacana: 1952; 74 years ago La Michoacana es natural 1992; 34 years ago Michoacán A Pedir de Boca 2016; 10 years ago
- Founder: Ignacio Alcázar; Agustín Andrade; Francisco Malfavon
- Headquarters: Mexico City, Mexico
- Area served: Mexico; United States
- Key people: Alejandro Andrade Andrade; Jesus Andrade; Eleuterio Oseguera
- Products: Paletas, ice-creams, etc.
- Website: www.lamichoacanaweb.com.mx www.lanuevamichoacana.com.mx

La Michoacana is a brand of several similar Mexican ice cream parlors. Currently, there are 3 different brands that claim the ownership of the name: Paleterías La Michoacana, La Nueva Michoacana, and Helados La Michoacana. All of them have "La Michoacana" in the name, pink branding, and a Mexican woman in the logo. Due to the fact these are not operated as franchises but rather as small, independent businesses that choose to use the name, the quality of the product, pricing, and assortment can vary widely among the thousands of locations.

There are an estimated 8,000 to 15,000 locations in Mexico. The brand is a successful business model network of family-run businesses, and no single company operates them as a formal franchise operation.

In 1992 Alejandro Andrade and a group of enthusiastic ITESO students developed an image that would unify all La Michoacana parlors. And now it is an image that belongs to the entire town of Tocumbo. Paleterias bearing the name La Michoacana (or variations of this) are also found throughout the United States, Central and South America.

The informal structure of the business has led to legal battles over the rights to the "La Michoacana" brand.

In January 2021, Wind Point Partners and portfolio company Tropicale Foods (Helados Mexico) announced the acquisition of Paleteria La Michoacana (“PLM”) from Canum Capital Partners and Greyrock Capital Group.

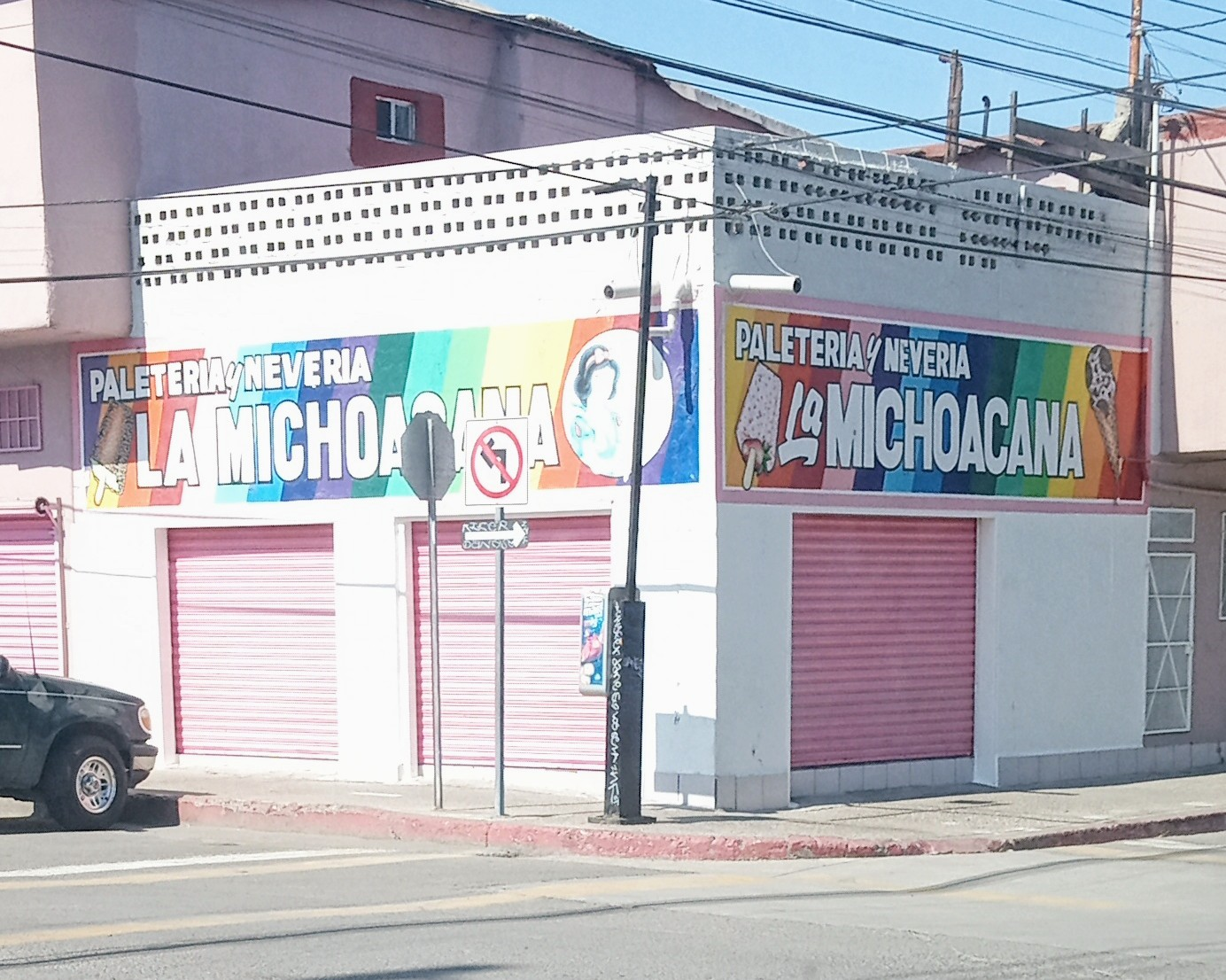
La Michoacana in Tijuana
