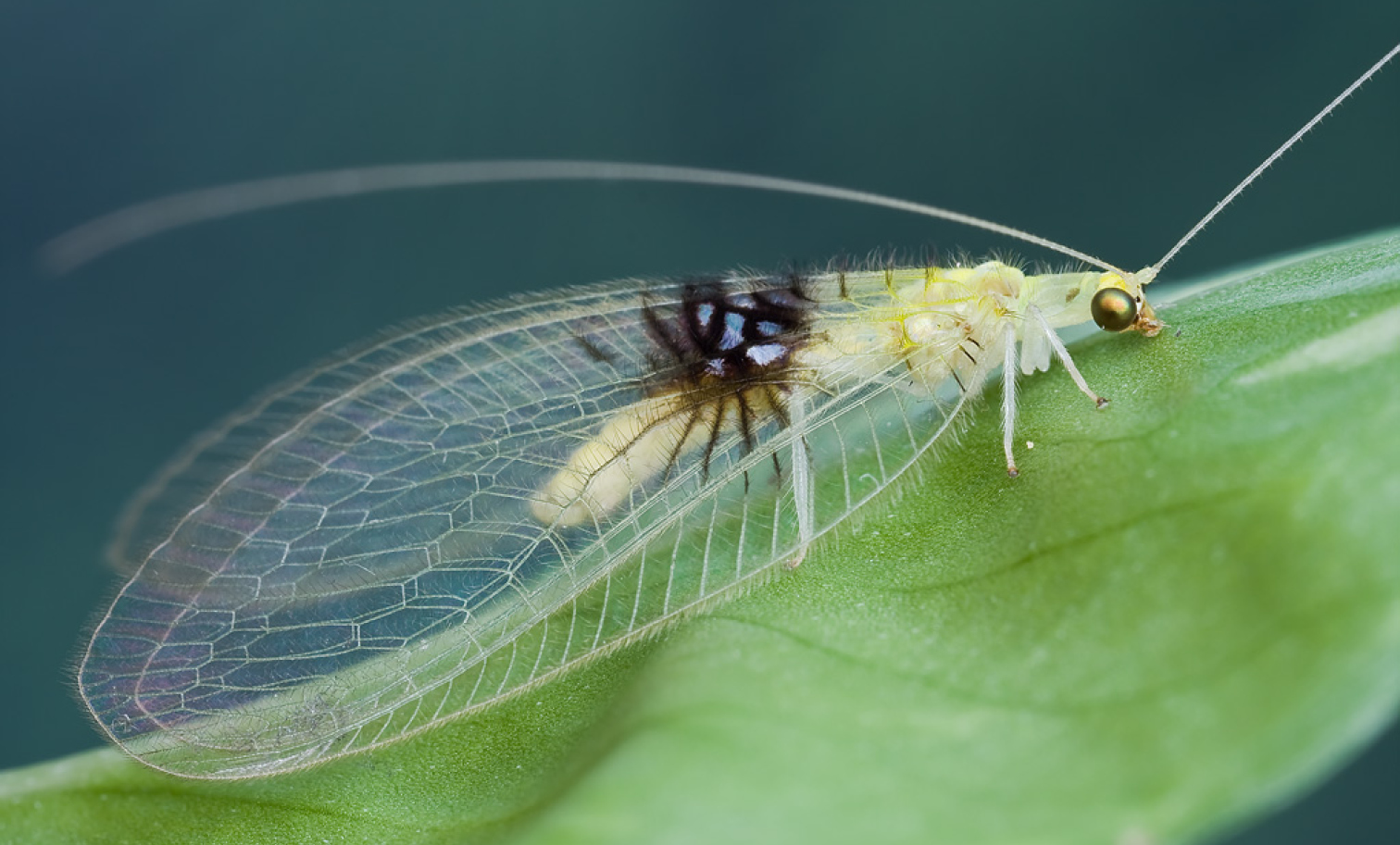
- Semachrysa jade female

Scientific classification
- Kingdom: Animalia
- Phylum: Arthropoda
- Class: Insecta
- Order: Neuroptera
- Family: Chrysopidae
- Genus: Semachrysa
- Species: S. jade

Binomial name
- Semachrysa jade Winterton & Guek & Brooks, 2012

= Semachrysa jade =

Species of lacewing

Semachrysa jade is a species of green lacewing from the Malaysian states of Perak, Selangor and Sabah. So far, very few specimens have been found, all female. They exhibit extensive black markings on the basal portion of both wings, which differentiates them from the 14 other species in the genus Semachrysa.

The species was discovered when a Malaysian amateur photographer, Hock Ping Guek, posted a picture of it to the online photo-sharing site Flickr. A California state entomologist saw it and was unable to identify the species; nor were any colleagues he shared the image with. Eventually, he contacted the photographer and was able to obtain a specimen. Further testing at the Natural History Museum in London confirmed that it was indeed a new species. Its discovery has been described as a triumph of citizen science.

The species was listed among the Top 10 New Species 2013 discovered in 2012 as selected by the International Institute for Species Exploration at Arizona State University out of more than 140 nominated species. Its distinctiveness is its resemblance to a venomous snake and its presence in an area of anthropogenic exploitation.

== Description ==
Semachrysa jade's usual coloration is yellow to pale green. It has forewings 15 mm (0.59 in) long and hindwings 13.5 to 14 mm (0.53 to 0.55 in) long. Its antennae have approximately 50 flagellomeres. Like all other species in its genus it is distinguished by its veined wings, and the dark markings in the center. It most resembles Semachrysa wallacei.

== Discovery ==
In May of 2011, Hock Ping Guek, a Malaysian photographer was hiking in Selangor State Park near Kuala Lumpur taking macrophotographs of the insects in the woods. He was focusing on somewhat rare lacewings as they perched on branches and leaves. On that trip, he was able to get a picture of a yellowish-green one with a black spot on its wing resembling another insect. He had seen it before, but it had flown away before he had been able to photograph it.

When he returned, he posted the images to Flickr, with a comment about how lucky he felt to finally get the image in four years of macro photography. Shaun Winterton, a senior entomologist at the California Department of Food and Agriculture, happened across the image shortly afterward. He was struck by the black marks on the wing, which he had never seen on a lacewing before. Despite his extensive field experience, he was unable to identify the species. Colleagues he emailed the link to were also baffled.

He emailed Guek and asked him if he had a specimen, as it was possibly an undiscovered species. Guek told him that the lacewing had flown off shortly after he took the picture, so he did not have one. A year later, Guek emailed Winterton and said he had seen the lacewing again and this time he had captured it. Winterton told him to send it to Steven J. Brooks at the Natural History Museum in London.

Brooks not only confirmed that it was a previously unknown species, he found a specimen that had been sent to the museum many years earlier from the Malaysian province of Sabah, on the island of Borneo, but had never been classified or studied. The three collaborated on a paper describing the new species with Google Docs. Winterton named the species not after its color but his daughter. He said there were likely to be more such discoveries. "There's thousands of images a minute uploaded on Flickr," he told National Public Radio.

In the abstract of the paper, published in ZooKeys in August 2012, the authors called the find "a joint discovery by [a] citizen scientist and professional taxonomists." They elaborated on this in the paper itself:

New species are increasingly being discovered by the general public with interests in the natural sciences long before they are recognized as new to science by professional taxonomists and formally described. With the rapid development of digital photographic technology, professional and amateur photographers are unknowingly discovering and informally documenting new species of animals and plants by placing images of them in online image databases long before taxonomists can examine them. In some cases the specimen is not collected, so this discovery is effervescent until additional specimens can be subsequently vouchered to enable type designation during the formal descriptive process.

== Images ==
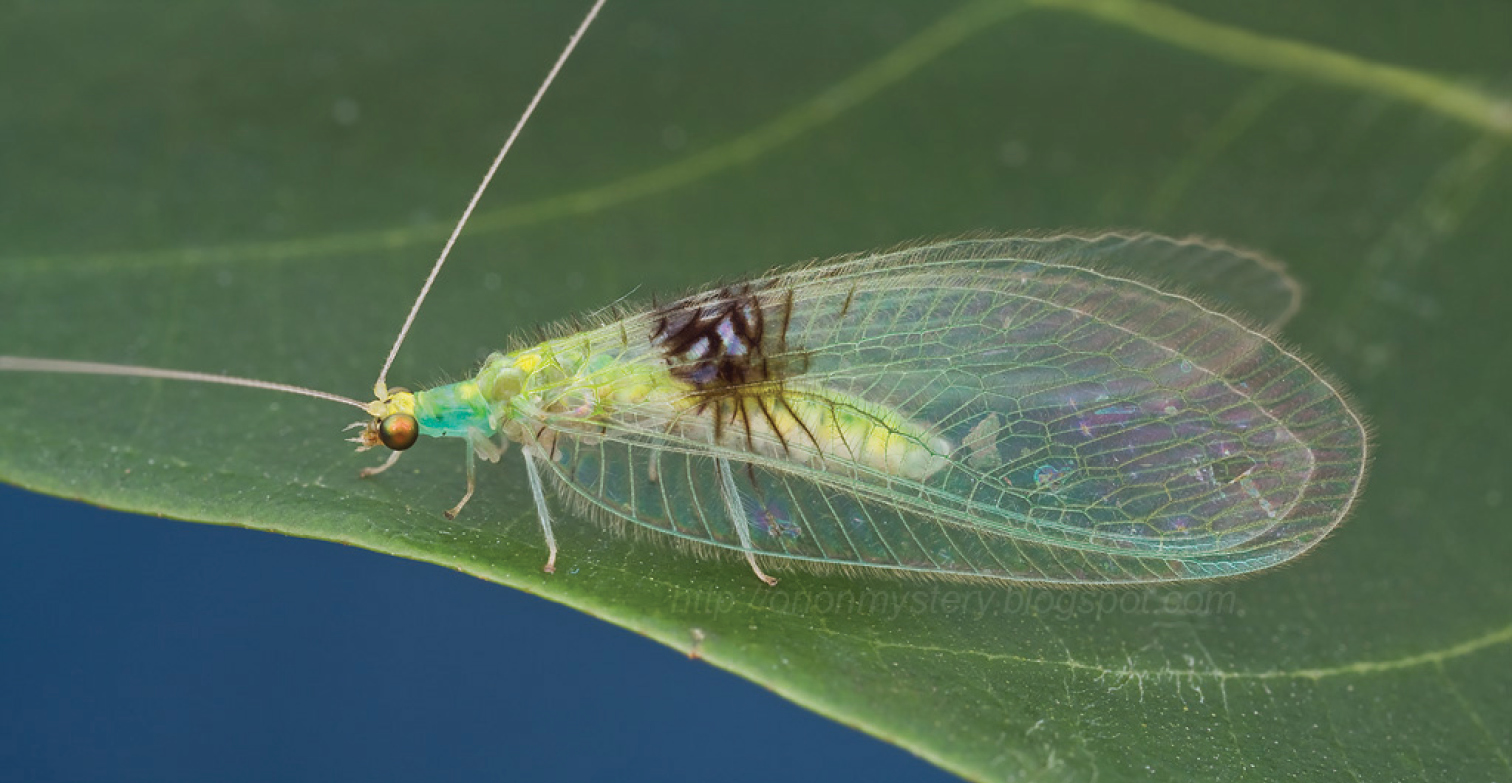
Female holotype

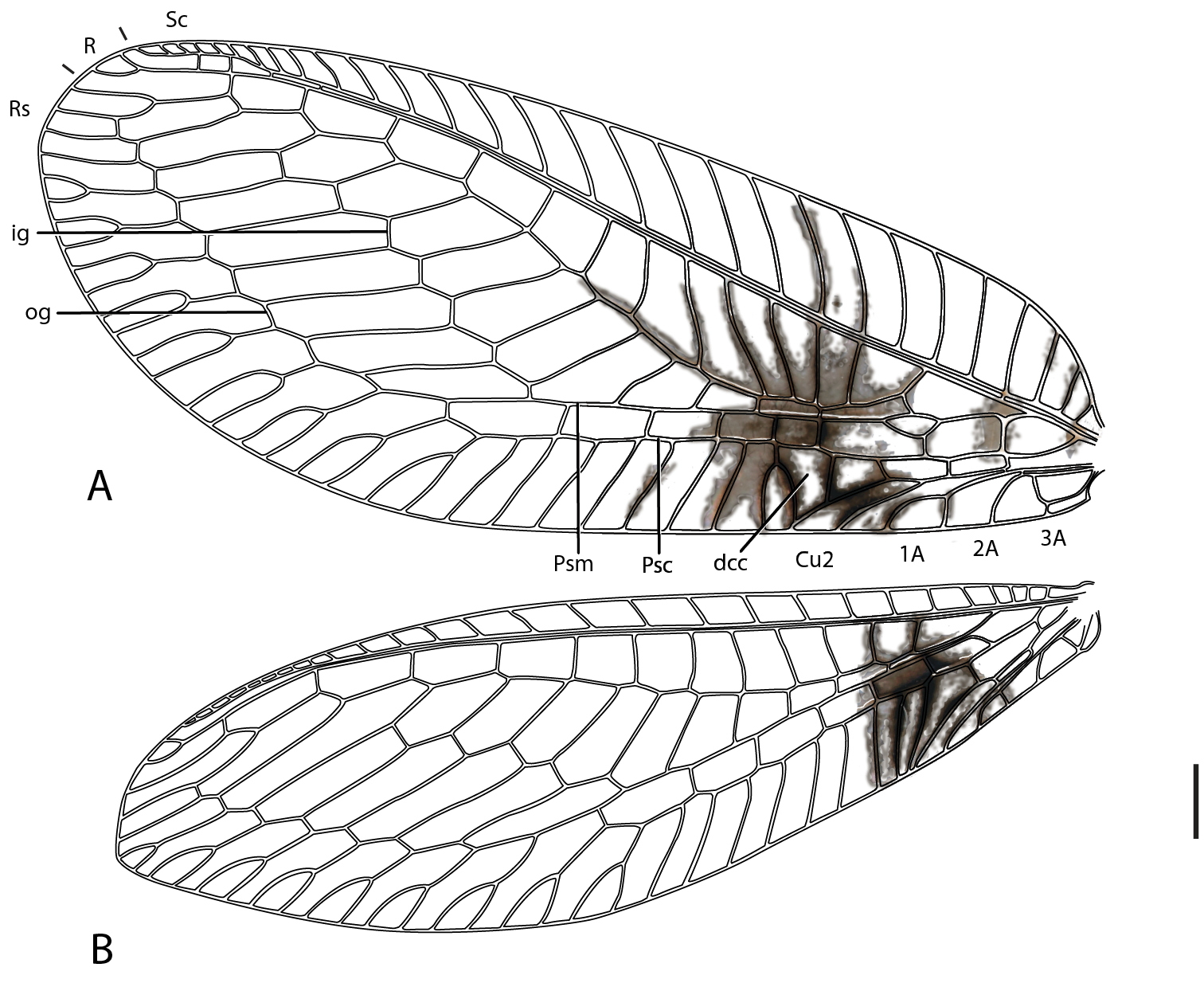
Wing diagrams

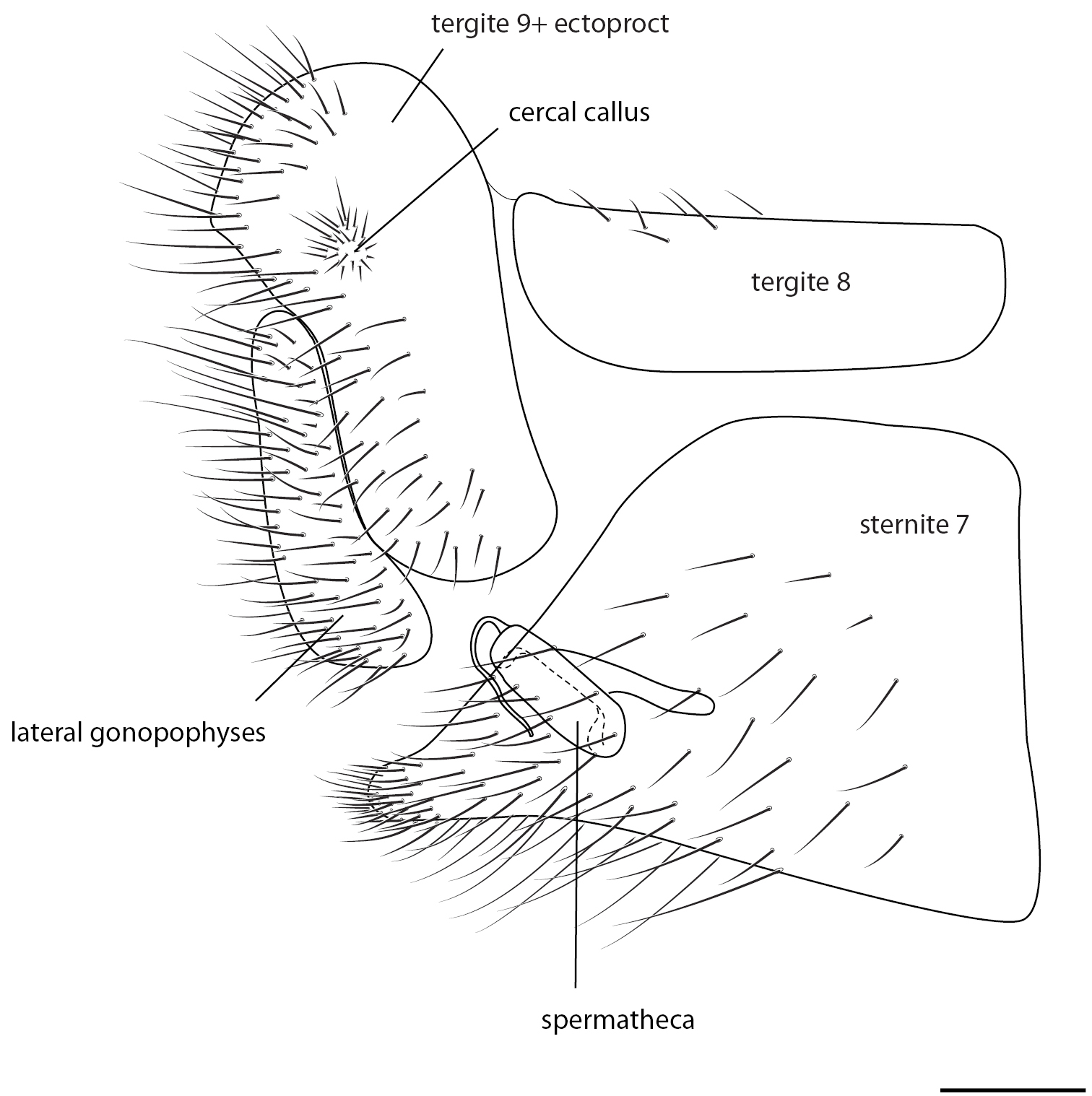
Female terminalia

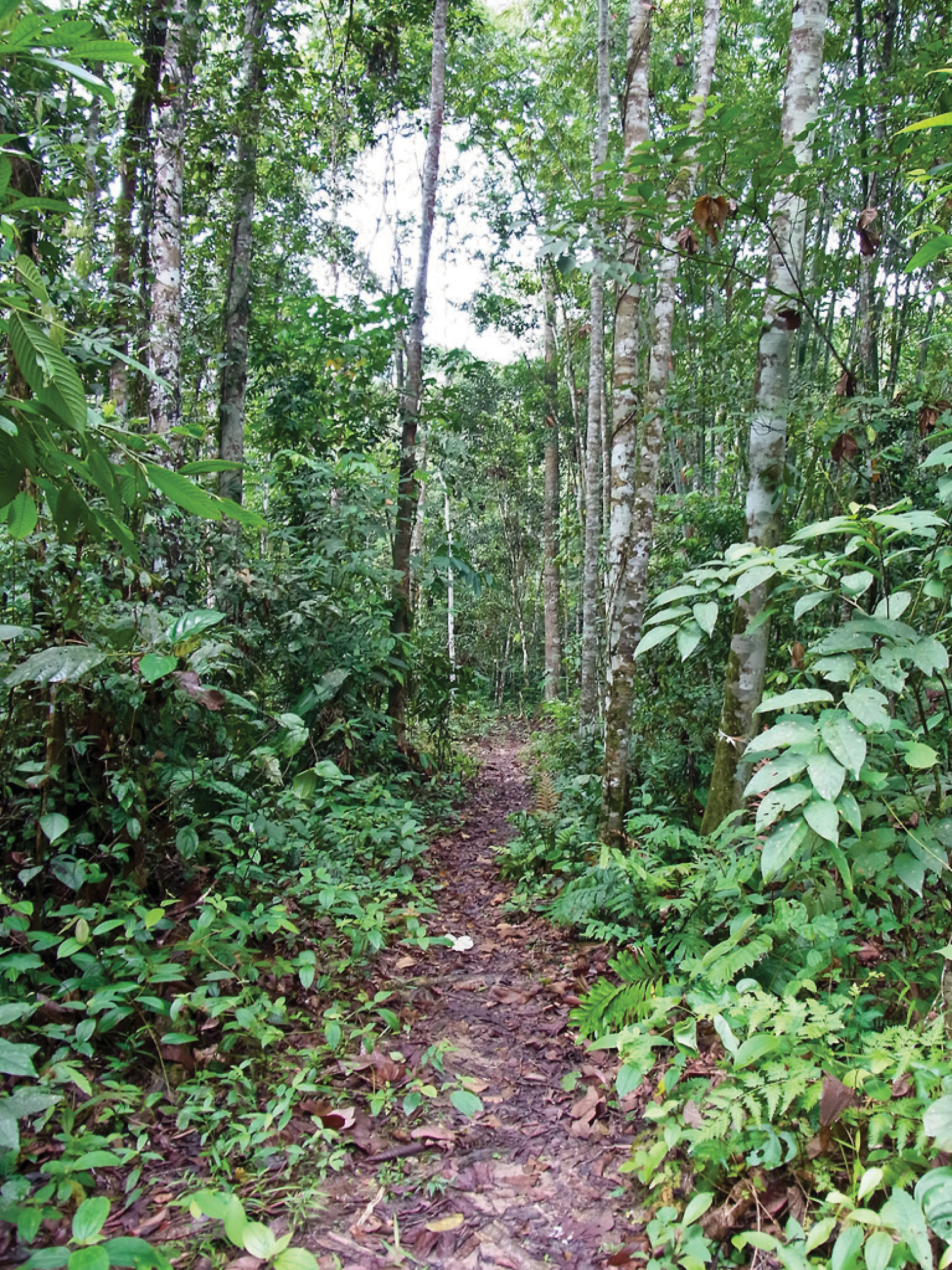
Type locality: Selangor State Park
