= Frank Epperson =

American inventor of the Popsicle (1894–1983)

- Born: Francis William Epperson; August 11, 1894; San Francisco, California
- Died: October 22, 1983 (aged 89); California
- Resting place: Mountain View Cemetery (Oakland, California)
- Occupations: Real estate agent, inventor
- Known for: Inventing the Popsicle
- Spouse: Mary Epperson

Francis William "Frank" Epperson (August 11, 1894 – October 22, 1983) was an American inventor and real estate agent best known for creating the ice pop, more commonly known as the Popsicle.

== Early life ==
Epperson was born in San Francisco, California in 1894. His family moved across the bay to Oakland around 1907. In 1905, Epperson allegedly left a glass of powdered soda mix and water with a wooden stirring stick on the back porch overnight. In the morning, Epperson found that the mixture had frozen. He named the mixture the "Epsicle," a combination of his surname and the word "icicle."

A 2022 San Francisco Gate investigation found that the only time between Epperson's birth in 1894 and his application for a patent in 1924 that San Francisco had reached freezing temperatures was in 1922, 15 years after Epperson had moved to Oakland.

== Career ==
As an adult, Epperson worked as a real estate agent in Oakland. In 1922, he presented the "Epsicle" for the first time at a fireman's ball. Epperson applied for a patent for a "frozen confection of attractive appearance, which can be conveniently consumed without contamination by contact with the hand and without the need for a plate, spoon, fork or other implement." The United States Patent and Trademark Office granted the patent (No. 1,505,592) on August 19, 1924.

Epperson's patent was for a "frozen confectionary". When the 'Epsicle' grew in popularity, it became known as the 'popsicle', a name which Epperson did not have trademarked. The treat was sold as a 'popsicle' by the Popsicle corporation, and while Epperson originally received royalties from Popsicle sales, he ended up having to sell his patent rights as a result of the Great Depression.

== Death ==
Epperson died on October 22, 1983, at the age of 89. He is buried at Mountain View Cemetery in Oakland. His grave is featured on an annual "Food Tour" celebrating local food pioneers, including Domingo Ghirardelli, Victor "Trader Vic" Bergeron, and the Folger Coffee family.
