= Neptune Beach (California) =

Amusement park in Alameda, California

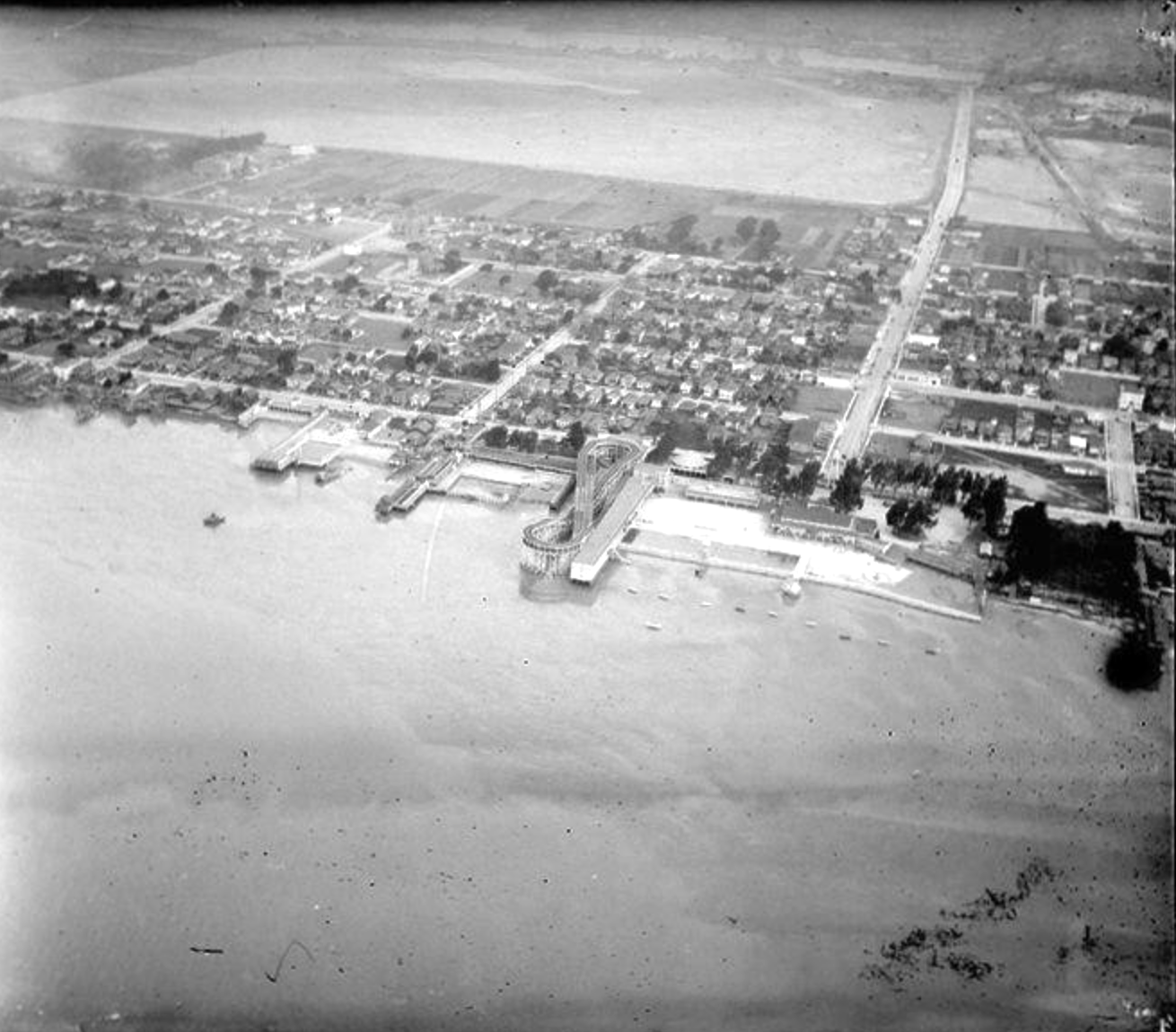
Aerial view of Neptune Beach, c. 1925

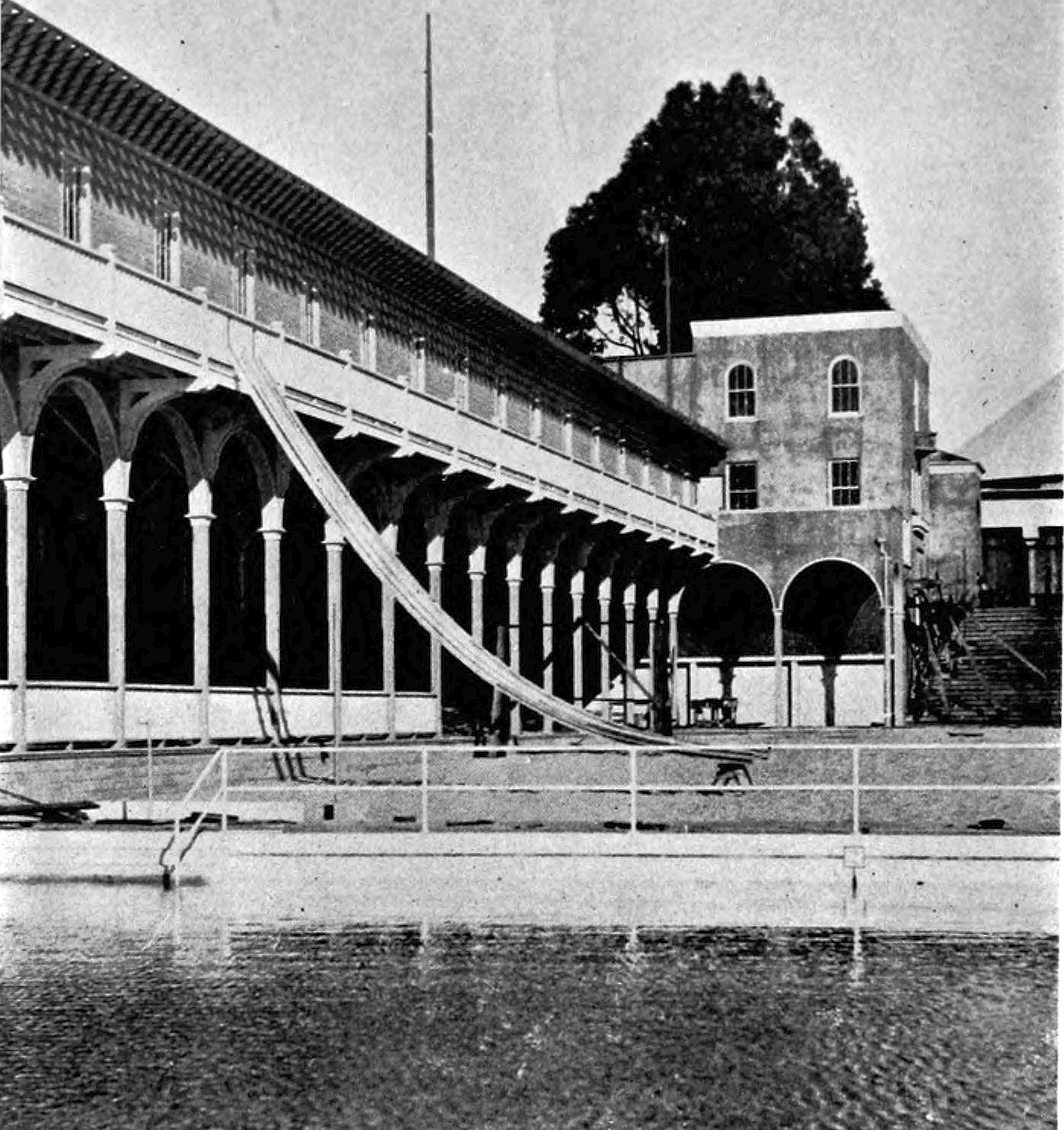
Bathing pavilion, 1917

Neptune Beach was an amusement park on the shore of San Francisco Bay in the city of Alameda, California, in operations from 1917 until 1939. The park was served by the Southern Pacific Transportation Company and ferries from San Francisco. It was nicknamed the "Coney Island of the West".

Opened in 1917, Neptune Beach occupied a beach front zone now known as Crab Cove and was originally owned by the Strehlow family. Admission to the park was a dime. The park was described as a place for private picnics, with a clubhouse for dancing, and barbecue pits. The Cottage Baths were vacation cottages, available for rent. There were dances on Friday and Saturday night.

== Attractions ==
The Strehlows owned and operated the beach and filled in a section of the Bay to add an additional Olympic-size swimming pool and a roller coaster with views of the Bay. Its two outdoor pools hosted swimming races and exhibitions by swimmers such as Olympian Johnny Weissmuller, who later starred as MGM's Tarzan, and Jack LaLanne who started a chain of health clubs. The park also featured a hand-carved carousel from the Dentzel Company and a Ferris wheel.

Both the American snow cone and the popsicle made their public debuts at Neptune Beach where they were first sold in 1923. The popsicle name comes from Frank "Pop" Epperson who sold his Epperson Ice Pop known as "Pop's Sicle."

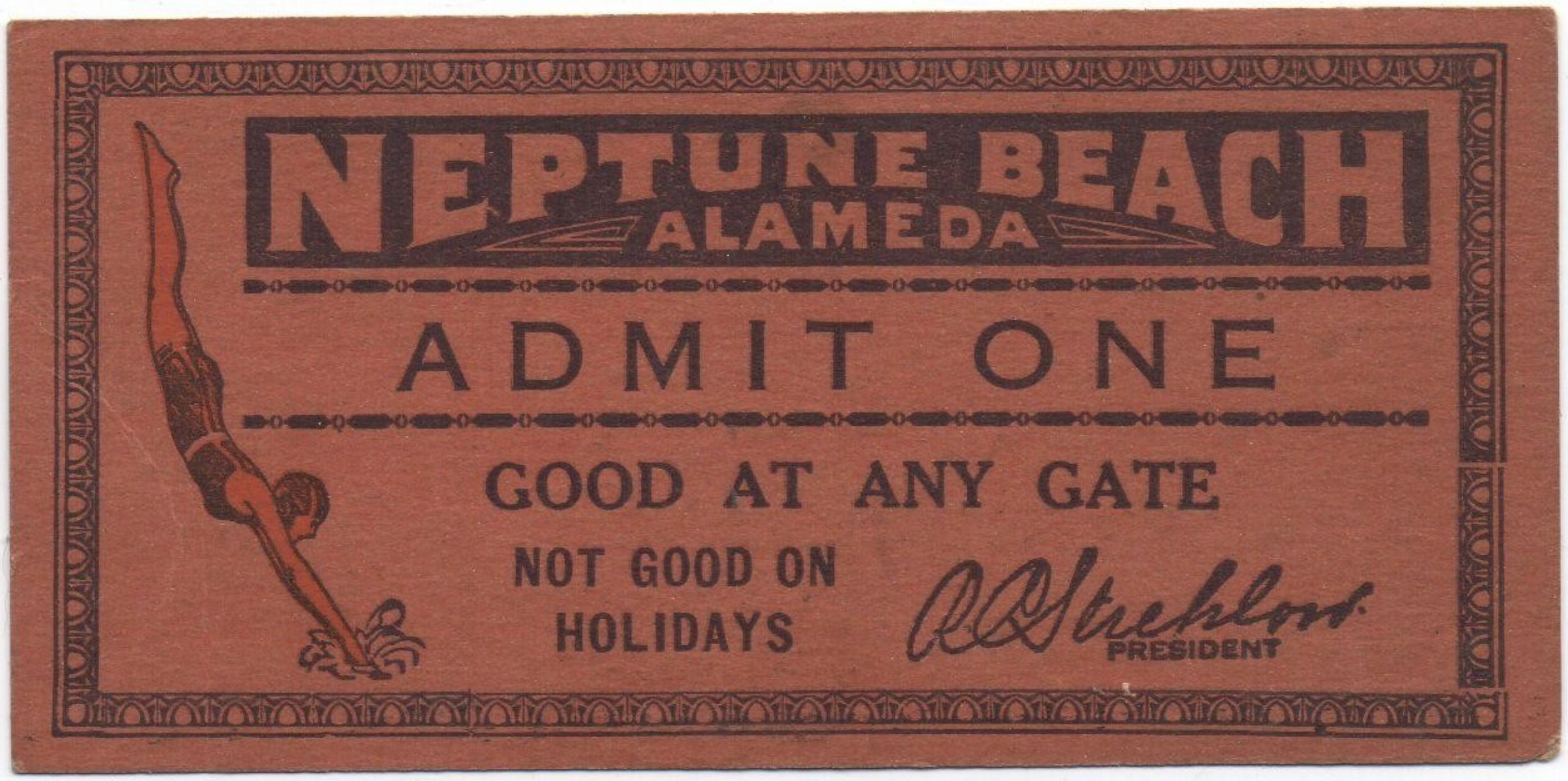
Neptune Beach ticket (c. 1920s)

== Closure ==
The park closed in 1939 because of the Great Depression, the completion of the San Francisco–Oakland Bay Bridge, people circumventing paying the admission price and, in general, the rise of car culture. Once the Bay Bridge was complete, the rail lines that ran past the entrance to Neptune Beach on the way to the Alameda Mole and the Ferry, lost riders in droves. People began using their cars to escape the city and the immediate suburbs like Alameda and traveling further afield in California. Alameda lost its resort status as more distant locations became more attractive to cash-rich San Francisco tourists. Young people in town became aware of ways to avoid paying the dime for admission to the park. Strong swimmers or even waders could sneak in on the bay side by swimming around the fence.

While some of the resort homes from Neptune Beach still exist and can be seen near Crab Cove, the vast majority of the structures—the carousel, the Ferris wheel, roller coaster and other rides—were auctioned off in 1940 for a fraction of their original costs. During World War II, the federal government bought the space to hold offices and renamed it Neptune Pointe.
