= Popsicle (brand) =

Brand of ice pops

- Product type: Ice pops
- Current owner: Good Humor-Breyers
- Country: Oakland, California, U.S.
- Introduced: 1922; 104 years ago
- Related brands: Fudgsicle; Creamsicle; Yosicle
- Markets: U.S. and Canada
- Previous owners: Joe Lowe Corporation; Sara Lee Corporation; Empire of Carolina; AmBrit; Gold Bond Ice Cream
- Registered as a trademark in: U.S. and Canada
- Website: popsicle.com

Popsicle is a Good Humor-Breyers brand of ice pop consisting of flavored, colored ice on a stick.

== History ==
=== 1905–1925: Frank Epperson ===
In 1905 in Oakland, California, 11-year-old Francis William "Frank" Epperson was mixing a powdered flavoring for soft drinks with water. He accidentally left it on the back porch overnight, with a stirring stick still in it. That night, the temperature dropped below freezing, and the next morning, Epperson discovered the drink had frozen to the stick, inspiring the idea of a fruit-flavored "popsicle".

In 1922, he introduced the creation at a fireman's ball, where according to reports it was "a sensation". In 1923, Epperson began selling the frozen pops to the public at Neptune Beach, an amusement park in Alameda, California. By 1924 Epperson had received a patent for his "frozen confectionery" which he called "the Epsicle ice pop". He renamed it Popsicle, supposedly at the insistence of his children. Popsicles were originally sold in fruity flavors and marketed as a "frozen drink on a stick."

Six months after receiving a patent for the Popsicle, Good Humor sued Popsicle Corporation. By October 1925, the parties settled out of court. Popsicle agreed to pay Good Humor a license fee to manufacture what was called frozen suckers from ice and sherbet products. Good Humor reserved the right to manufacture these products from ice cream, frozen custard, and the like.

=== 1925–1965: Joe Lowe Company ===
In 1925, Epperson sold the rights to the Popsicle to the Joe Lowe Company of New York, who set up a subsidiary called Popsicle Industries to sell the product. "I was flat and had to liquidate all my assets," he recalled years later. "I haven't been the same since."

=== 1965–1987: Consolidated Foods ===
In 1965, Popsicle Industries was sold to Consolidated Foods Corporation (later renamed ‘Sara Lee’).

=== 1986–1993: Split ownership ===
By 1986, Sara Lee was struggling to bring Popsicle to profitability, so the company sold the U.S. operations of Popsicle Industries to the Gold Bond Ice Cream Company in Green Bay, Wisconsin.

In 1987, Sara Lee sold the Canadian operations of Popsicle Industries to AmBrit Inc. In 1990, Empire of Carolina bought the Canadian operations of Popsicle Industries from Ambrit Inc.

=== Since 1989: Unilever ===
In 1989, Good Humor, now a subsidiary of Unilever, bought the U.S. rights to the Popsicle brand from Gold Bond and folded the U.S. operations of Popsicle Industries into its Good Humor-Breyers division.

In 1993, Unilever bought the corporate assets of Isaley Klondike from Empire of Carolina, which included the Klondike bar brand and the Canadian operations of Popsicle Industries. This re-united the Popsicle brand for the Canadian and U.S. markets under the Good Humor-Breyers division.

== Popsicle Pete ==
In April 1939, a company mascot called Popsicle Pete was introduced on the radio program Buck Rogers in the 25th Century as having won the "Typical American Boy Contest". The character told listeners that they could win presents by sending wrappers from Popsicle products to the manufacturer. Pete continued to appear in the company's U.S. advertising campaigns until the 1989 acquisition by Good Humor. During the 1940s, Popsicle Pete ads were created by Woody Gelman and his partner Ben Solomon, and appeared on Popsicle brand packages for decades.

The mascot was then introduced in Canada in 1988 and featured in television commercials, promotions, and print advertisements until 1996.

== Products ==
Fudgicle advertisement from 1938. Popsicle brands sponsored the Popeye radio show in 1938–1939.

The Popsicle brand began expanding from its original flavors after being purchased by Good Humor-Breyers in 1989. Under the Popsicle brand, Good Humor-Breyers holds the trademark for both Creamsicle and Fudgsicle. Creamsicle's center is vanilla ice cream, covered by a layer of flavored ice. Fudgsicle, originally sold as Fudgicle, is a flat, frozen dessert that comes on a stick and is chocolate-flavored with a texture somewhat similar to ice cream—not to be confused with Chocolate Popsicles.

Firecrackers are a brand of Popsicles that come in a shape resembling a firecracker (the top being red (cherry), the middle white (white lemon), and the bottom blue (blue raspberry)). These have a similar appearance to Wells Dairy's Blue Bunny's Bomb Pop. Slow Melt Pops include a small amount of gelatin that helps them stay frozen longer than traditional ice pops. Slow Melt Pops are available in several varieties.

Yosicles are a brand of Popsicle that contain yogurt. Revello Bars are chocolate covered ice cream on a stick.

Fruit Twisters are a brand of Popsicle that have fruit juice, milk and cane sugar.

== See also ==
- Fab (brand)
- Ice cream bar
- Ice pop
- List of frozen dessert brands
- Italian ice
- Míša
