= Streets (ice cream) =

Australian ice cream brand

- Trade name: Streets Ice Cream
- Type: Subsidiary
- Industry: Food processing
- Founded: 1920; 106 years ago in Corrimal, New South Wales, Australia
- Founder: Edwin 'Ted' Street
- Headquarters: Minto, Australia
- Products: Ice cream
- Brands: Paddle Pop, Golden Gaytime, Cornetto, Magnum, Bubble O' Bill, Weis
- Number of employees: 201 (2017)
- Parent: The Magnum Ice Cream Company
- Website: streetsicecream.com.au

Streets is an Australian ice cream brand bought by the British multinational company Unilever in 1960 and currently owned by The Magnum Ice Cream Company (TMICC). Some products are made in China and shipped to Australia and New Zealand. It is part of TMICC's ice cream brand Heartbrand. The company is in a long-term contract with dairy company Dairy Farmers.

== History ==
Streets was founded by Edwin "Ted" Street and his wife Daisy in 1920, in Corrimal, New South Wales. He set up a distribution depot at Bexley and then a factory in the Sydney suburb of Turrella, where products were manufactured until 1996, when production moved to a new facility in Minto. Today most cream-based products are produced at Minto, while water-based products are imported from China.

Streets introduced the Paddle Pop in 1953, and sold over ninety million units by century's end. It is, per capita, the world's best selling ice cream.

In 1960, the company was purchased by Unilever. In the early 1980s, Streets purchased the Adelaide-based company, AMSCOL, which had been founded in 1922.

In 2017, Unilever applied to the Fair Work Commission to terminate the current enterprise agreement on wages and conditions and return factory workers to award conditions. The Australian Manufacturing Workers Union, which represents the workers, warned that they face a pay cut of up to 46 per cent. The union called on Australians to boycott Streets products in protest. A settlement was negotiated in November 2017.

== Corporate logo ==
Streets shares the Heartbrand logo with Wall's, HB Ice Cream, Good Humor, GB Glace, Selecta, Kibon and Algida—used in the United Kingdom, Poland, Ireland, the United States, Canada, Sweden, Philippines, Brazil and Argentina, and Italy respectively. All brands are owned by The Magnum Ice Cream Company.

From 1962 to 1998 (with a change in 1968), the logo consisted of a badge containing the word Streets on a background of vertical red and white stripes.

== Brands and products ==
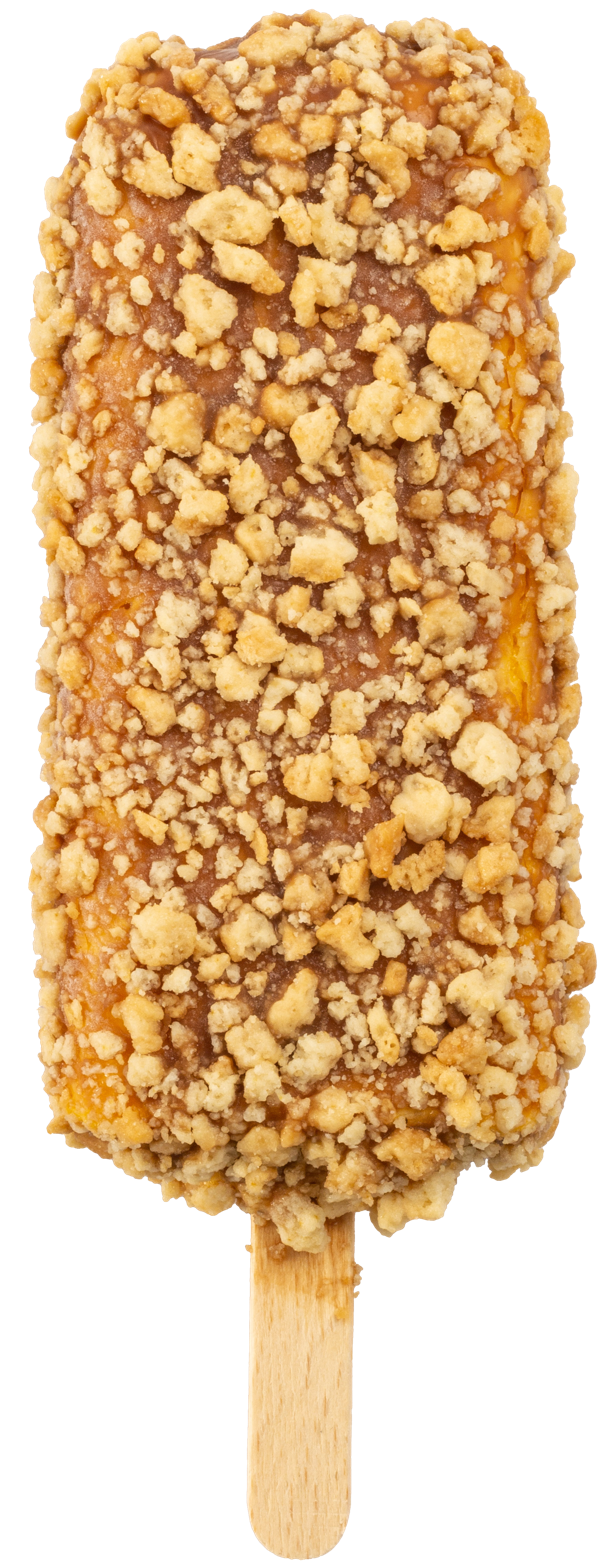
An original flavour Golden Gaytime

The following are some of the brands/products sold under the Streets name. In August 2017, parent company Unilever acquired the Weis brand from family-ownership, bringing it under the Streets umbrella.

- Blue Ribbon
- Bubble O' Bill
- Calippo
- Cornetto
- Cremissimo
- Cyclone
- Golden Gaytime (Australia) or Cookie Crumble (NZ)
- Magnum
- Paddle Pop
- Splice
- Viennetta
- Weis

== See also ==
- List of ice cream brands
