= Paddle Pop =

Ice cream brand

Paddle Pop is a brand of ice confection products originally created by Streets, which is owned by The Magnum Ice Cream Company. It is sold in Australia, New Zealand, and a few other countries. It is held for eating by a wooden stick which protrudes at the base. The brand has a mascot known as the Paddle Pop Lion, or Max, who appears on the product wrapper.

Paddle Pops have been very popular since their launch by Streets in 1953, and the name has become one of the best known brands in Australia. It is Streets Icecream's biggest volume item with A$70 million annual turnover.

== History ==
Launched to the public in 1953, the brand had a 50-year anniversary in 2004 at which point it was one of the best known brands in Australia. The wooden stick holding the confection is known as a Paddle Pop stick (used commonly for arts and crafts and known also as a popsicle stick or craft stick).

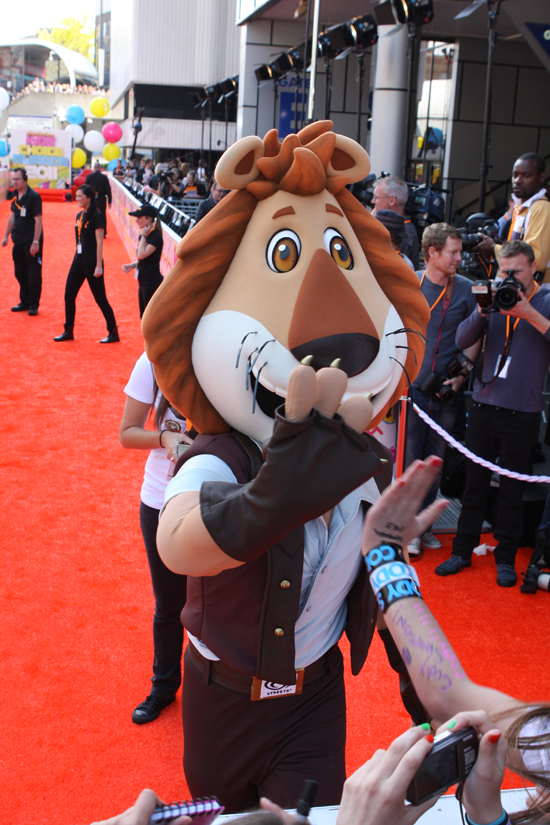
Paddle Pop Lion mascot costume

In 1960, the brand's mascot was introduced, the Paddle Pop lion.

In 1999, Paddle Pop was launched in Malaysia and Indonesia with a promotion that featured a thermochromic glow-in-the-dark plastic stick.

In 2005, there was a spin-off product which was the Paddle Pop flavour in a dairy snack form. Paddle Pops is now available in 20 countries, although other countries may sell them under different brands from Streets' Heartbrand sister companies, Wall's and HB Ice Cream.

Paddle Pop Adventures, a Thai animated series, had its first release in late 2005. There are 12 movies for this series, as well as two other animations. Each part was originally released in separate episodes, but was condensed into dubbed movies for Australian audiences.

Streets came to media attention in 2010 when they reduced the size of the Paddle Pop by 15%. Streets claimed that this was to make them healthier but others attribute it to food inflation.

The Beach Hotel in Seaford, Adelaide, is known for creating unique cocktails. One of their products is the 'Rainbow Paddle Pop Martini'.

== Varieties ==
Paddle Pop ice creams and ice blocks are available in box packs, in ice cream buckets, cups, and commonly in singular form inside freezer displays in stores.

=== Ice creams ===
- Chocolate - First flavour and only one available for 1953 and 1954.
- Coconut - 1955
- Orange - 1957 - Non-milk, fruit juice based
- Pineapple - 1957 - Non-milk, fruit juice based
- Apple-Lime - 1957 - Non-milk, fruit juice based
- Chocolate Mint - 1957
- Fruit Salad - 1960
- Vanilla - 1960
- Lime - 1962
- Raspberry - 1962
- Caramel - 1963
- Buccaneer - 1966 (liquorice)
- Strawberry - 1960s
- Butterscotch - 1970
- Spearmint - 1970
- Bubble Gum - 1974 (all pink)
- Bubble Gum - 1979 (pink over white)
- Banana - 1970s
- Mint Choc - 1982 (all green outside, chocolate inside)
- Choc Dip Vanilla - 1984
- Choc Toff - 1984
- Bubble Gum - 1984 (purple dip top half over pink [bottom half])
- Banana Split - 1988
- Rainbow - 1988
- Toffee Apple - 1990
- Mint Choc - 1990 (Choc dip top 2/3 over green)
- Blue Bubble Gum - 1991
- Strawberry-Choc - 1992
- Caramel Choc - 1993
- Choc Malt - 1994
- Double Bubblegum - 1995
- Caramel Tracks - 1996
- Choc Mint Print - 1996
- Honey Malt Choc - 1998
- Banana Split - 1999
- Mud Puddle - 1999
- Paw Prints - 2002, Vanilla, Caramel (shaped like a lion paw print)
- Bionic Bubble Gum - 2002
- Flaky Choc Caramel - 2004
- Solar Flare - 2004
- Moo - 2008
- Gooey Toffee Apple - 2012
- Caramel Choc Dip - 2017 (Blast from the Past)
- Bionic Bubble Gum - 2017 (Blast from the Past)
- Vanilla - 2017 (Blast from the Past)
- Choc Mint Paw Print - 2018 (Blast from the Past)
- Caramel Choc - 2019 (Blast from the Past)
- Strawberry Milkshake - 2020
- Koala Choc Caramel - 2020 (brown and cream koala face shape)
- Choc Banana - 2025

==== Indonesia exclusive ====
- Choco Magma (chocolate milk)
- Choco Lava (chocolate with creamy sauce)
- Fruit Slice Milk Melon
- Mochi Choco Vanilla

=== Ice blocks ===
- Lemonade
- Twirly Pop
- Icy Twist
- Cyclone
- Tubes
- Tubes Minis
- Tornado Grape
- Big Yakoo
- Paddle Pop Spider-Man Strawberry
- Dragon Popper
- Icy Blast Off - Lemonade & Raspberry
- Paddle Pop "Icy Blast Off" Minions
- Twister Mermaid
- Paddle Pop Doraemon
- Cola Blast
- Fun Orange
- Fruit Pop
- Banana Boat (also sold as Street's Monkey Banana)
- Trico (strawberry soursop and guava flavoured, Indonesia exclusive)
- Ocean Freeze (not available in Australia)
- Dino Freeze (not available in Australia)
- Lemon Blast (Indonesia exclusive)

=== Other ===
- Chocolate Frozen Thick Shake
- Shaky Shake
- Jiggly Jelly Bubble Gum
- Chocolate Flavoured Frozen Dessert
- Apple Grape Blast (jelly)
- Mini fruits (orange mango & passion pine)
- Mini milks (strawberry, chocolate)
- Marshmallow Twister (Indonesia exclusive)

== In popular culture ==
In 2009 Australian rules football team Brisbane Lions changed the traditional "Fitzroy" lion design on their guernsey to one which was criticised for a "cartoonish" resemblance to the Paddle Pop lion; the club returned to the previous design in 2015.
