= Frigo (surname) =

Italian surname

Frigo is an Italian surname from a short form of Federigo. Notable people with the surname include:

- Armando Frigo (1917–1943), Italian-American soccer player
- Darci Frigo, Brazilian land reform activist
- Dario Frigo (born 1973), Italian road bicycle racer
- Franco Frigo (born 1950), Italian politician from Veneto
- Giovanni Frigo (born 1963), Venezuelan swimmer
- Giuseppe Frigo (1935–2019), Italian judge
- Johnny Frigo (1916–2007), American jazz violinist and bassist
- Leo Frigo (1931–2001), American businessman and philanthropist
- Luca Frigo (born 1993), Italian ice hockey player
- Manuel Frigo (born 1997), Italian swimmer
- Marco Frigo (born 2000), Italian road racing cyclist
- Mark Frigo, American economist
- Romeo Frigo (born 1946), Swiss archer
- Rudi Frigo (born 1974), Australian rules footballer

Fictional characters:

- Mario Frigo, fictional character in Just Cause 3
- Tommy Frigo, fictional character in Adventureland

== See also ==
- Frigo (disambiguation)
