= HB Wall's =

Ice cream brand in Northern Ireland

- Current owner: The Magnum Ice Cream Company
- Produced by: HB & Wall's
- Country: Northern Ireland

HB Wall's is an ice cream brand in Northern Ireland and is part of the Unilever Group's Heartbrand ice cream brand.

HB and Wall's ice cream have been sold together in Northern Ireland and promoted together as HB Wall's.
