= Cornetto (frozen dessert) =

Italian brand of ice cream

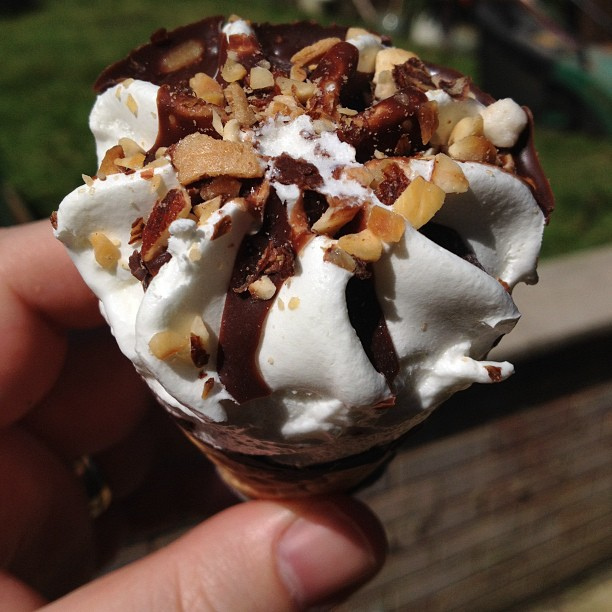
- Product type: Ice cream
- Current owner: The Magnum Ice Cream Company
- Country: Italy
- Introduced: 1959; 67 years ago
- Markets: Worldwide
- Previous owners: Unilever (until 2025)
- Website: www.unilever.co.uk/brands/foods-refreshment/cornetto/

Cornetto (Italian: [korˈnetto]; 'little horn') is an Italian brand of ice cream cone dessert, which is manufactured and owned by The Magnum Ice Cream Company. Cornettos are sold as part of the Heartbrand product line, known internationally by different names, including Algida in Italy, Wall's in the UK, Singapore and Pakistan, HB in Ireland, Frigo in Spain, and Kwality Wall's in India. Many variations of the product exist, ranging from milk-based ice cream to vegetable fat-based dessert.

== History ==
For a long time, the idea of selling frozen ice cream cones had been impractical, as the ice cream would soak into the moist cone during the manufacturing process and make it soggy and unpalatable when served. In 1959, Spica and Mario Faccenda, two Italian ice cream manufacturers based in Naples, overcame this problem by insulating the inside of the waffle cone from the ice cream with a coating of oil, sugar, and chocolate.

In 1962, Unilever acquired Spica which owned the Cornetto brand, and began marketing the product in Italy through the Algida brand and abroad through other subsidiaries, including Streets in Australia (1966), Wall's in the UK (1976) and Pakistan, HB in Ireland, Frigo in Spain and Kwality Wall's in India. They are sold in many different sizes throughout Europe, ranging from 28-ml Miniatures to 260-ml King Cones, though the 90-ml and 125-ml sizes tend to be the most popular.

On March 19, 2024, Unilever announced it would divest its ice cream brands and cut 7,500 jobs in order to make "a simpler, more focused and higher performing Unilever". Included in the spin-off are Ben & Jerry's, Cornetto, Magnum, Talenti, and Wall's. The divestment is expected to be completed by the end of 2025.

== Varieties ==
The product is available in a variety of flavours, including Strawberry, Mint Chocolate, Nut, Lemon, Whippy (yogurt flavour with a chewy chocolate), Valentine's Day flavours, and Cornetto Soft (soft ice cream that comes in chocolate chip, cookie dough, royale strawberry, unicornetto, dragon cornetto, vanilla, chocolate, royale chocolate and double chocolate). Cornetto Soft is sold on the street by vendors and is made on the spot with an ice cream dispenser, but the other flavours are premade and factory packaged. Also, Cornetto Enigma is made, which consists of cookies and cream, raspberry and double chocolate flavours.

Unilever introduced a Cornetto chocolate confectionery into the UK market in 2013, following a licensing deal with Kinnerton Confectionery.

Hindustan Unilever manufacture Cornettos using vegetable fat rather than milk fat, and under Indian law it cannot be advertised as being ice cream.

Cornetto introduced a new product, the Cornetto Max which combines two distinct ice-creams, a sauce, and a chocolate disc top, to better appeal to Gen Zs.

== Advertising campaigns ==
=== 'O sole mio campaign ===
The brand was marketed in the United Kingdom, Ireland, and Brazil by successful advertising campaigns which placed the Neapolitan song "'O sole mio" into a variety of stereotypical Italian locations and situations, with its lyrics changed to:

Just one Cornetto,
give it to me,
delicious ice cream, of Italy,
creamy vanilla and choco dream,
Give me Cornetto,
from Wall's ice cream.

(in the UK)

give it to me,
a big ol' nut and chocolate dream,
HB Cornetto
spells the best ice cream.

(in Ireland)

Dame un Cornetto
Molto crocante
E più cremoso
É da Gelato.
Cornetto é da própria Itália.
Ti voglio tanto,
Corneeeeetto mio!

(in Brazil)

In Britain and Ireland, the advertisements ran for ten years during the 1980s and 1990s, with the song supposedly sung by former Italian waiter Renato Pagliari of one-hit wonders Renée and Renato. (However, this is claimed not to be the case by Pagliari's son, Remo.) It was credited to "Count Giovanni Di Regina" and produced by Jonathan King, who released it as a single. In 2000, the Wall's Cornetto commercial was ranked 23rd in Channel 4's UK poll of "The 100 Greatest TV Ads". The theme resurfaced in 2006, this time sung by pedestrians, drivers, office workers, and marathon runners in Central London.

Following the Cornetto's UK launch in 1976, the song was regularly parodied using alternative lyrics, 'Just one Cornetto, Give it to me, Not bloomin' likely, They're 30p !' given the popular conception that the product was very expensive compared to other ice cream offerings at the time.

=== Philippines 20 pesos campaign ===
In the Philippines, the "sarap ng 20 Pesos" (lit. 'delicious 20 pesos') campaign was launched in 2009, relying on humour and focused on the product's affordability, with skits that showed things one could not buy with 20 pesos or situations where such a price would be unrealistic, and suggesting that the audience should buy a Cornetto instead. "Mag-Cornetto ka na lang" (lit. 'Just have a Cornetto instead') and "Hanggang saan aabot ang 20 pesos mo?" (lit. 'How far will your 20 pesos take you?') were used as slogans for the campaign. By May 2011, 30 story-lines had been produced. In 2019, the SRP price of Cornetto became 25 pesos. However, in 2023, this was reverted to 20 pesos again.

The television advertisement entitled "Tugs", which is part of the campaign, was selected as the Adobo Ad of the Year for 2010 through online voting at the ad agency band night "Lakihan Mo Logo 14".

== In popular culture ==
- The ice cream is referenced in the films Shaun of the Dead (2004), Hot Fuzz (2007) and The World’s End (2013); the three films are together known as the Three Flavours Cornetto Trilogy.
- The ice cream is referenced by Irish band Bell X1 in their 2009 single The Great Defector.

== See also ==
- Streets – Australian brand
- Drumstick & Extreme – competitors by Nestlé
- Nutty Buddy – competitor formerly by Sweetheart Foods
- Three Flavours Cornetto trilogy – a trilogy of films directed by Edgar Wright that briefly features the ice cream
