= Yasso (frozen yogurt) =

American frozen yogurt brand

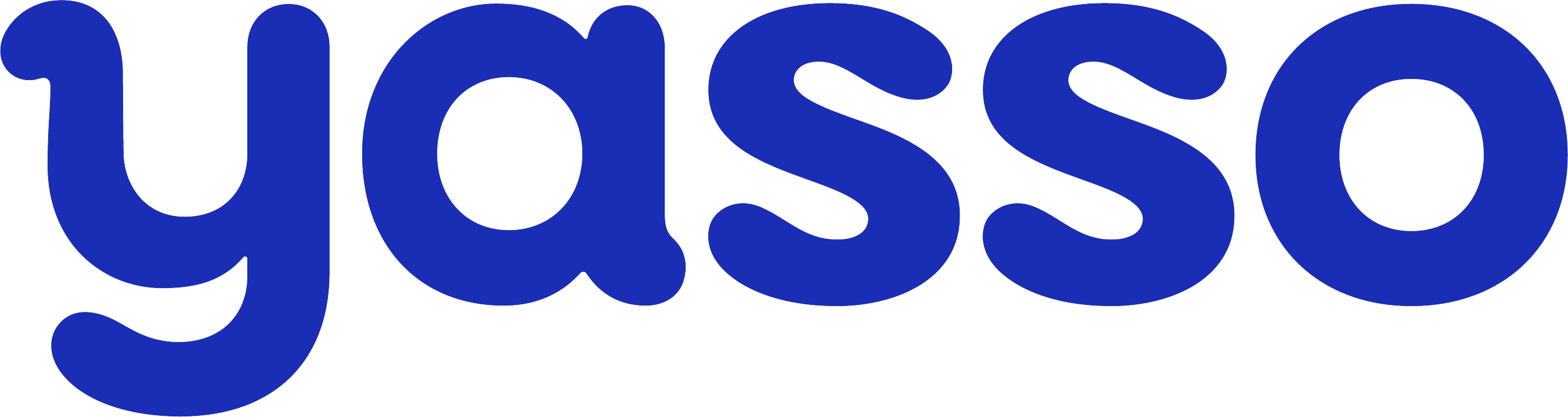
- Product type: Frozen yogurt
- Current owner: The Magnum Ice Cream Company
- Country: United States
- Introduced: 2011
- Markets: United States
- Previous owners: Unilever (until 2025)
- Tagline: "Ice cream, meet your upgrade."
- Website: www.yasso.com

Yasso is an American frozen yogurt brand that specializes in low-calorie snacks, especially frozen Greek yogurt bars.

== History ==
Yasso was founded in Boston in 2011 by childhood friends Amanda Klane and Drew Harrington, then in their twenties. The brand grew rapidly, and by 2016 was projected to earn over $50 million in revenue.

Yasso entered into an agreement with the private equity firms Breakaway Ventures and Castanea Partners in 2018, with Castenea Partners becoming a majority investor in the brand. Craig Shiesley was named CEO of Yasso in 2019. Klane and Harrington had previously been co-CEOs.

In 2023, Yasso was acquired by Unilever, which also owns the frozen dessert brands Ben & Jerry's, Magnum and Talenti.
