= Bubble O' Bill =

Ice cream brand

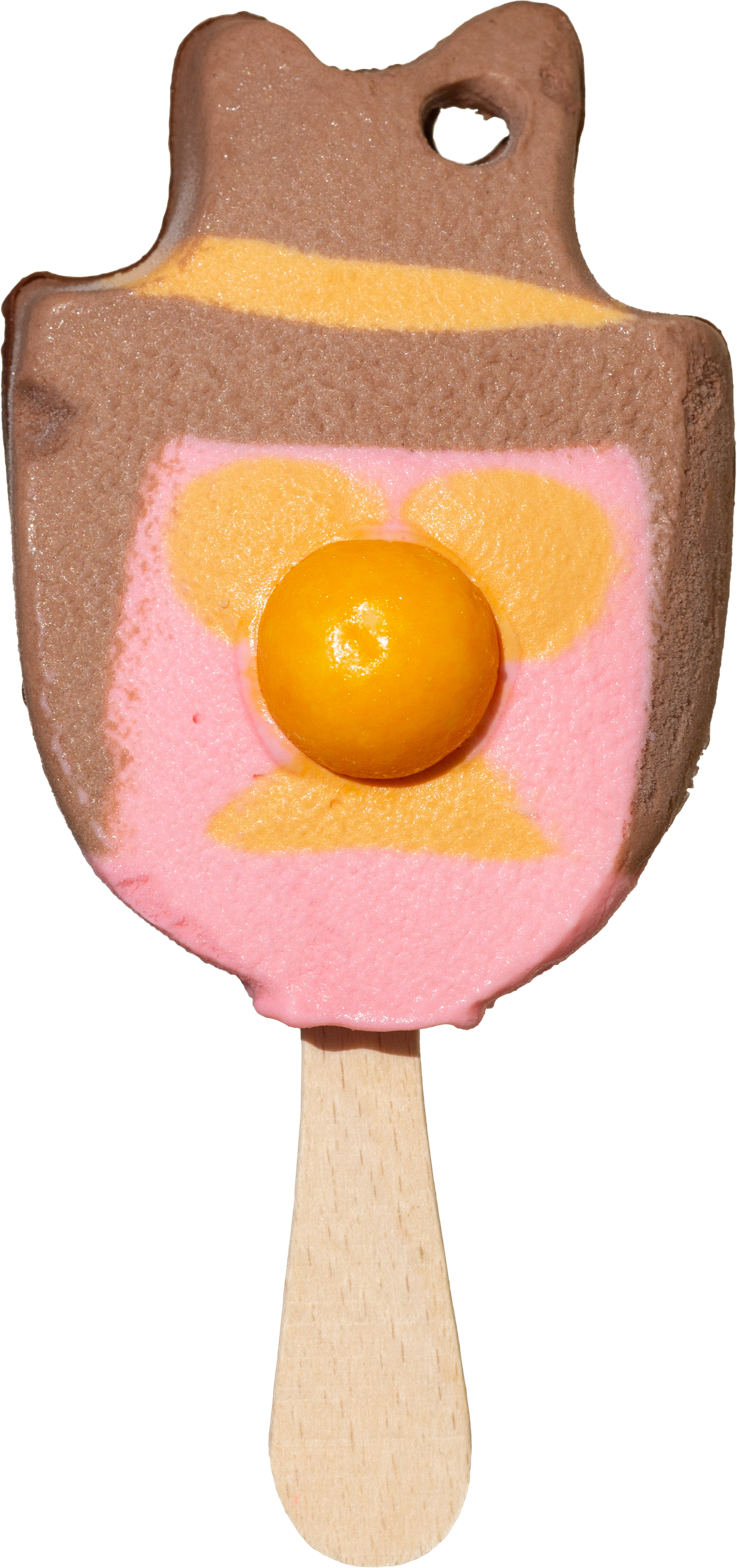
- A Bubble O'Bill with a yellow gumball
- Type: Ice cream
- Inception: 1985
- Manufacturer: Streets
- Available: Yes
- Website: streetsicecream.com.au/brands/bubble-o-bill.html

Bubble O'Bill
Nutritional value per 100 g (3.5 oz)
- Energy: 1,030 kJ (250 kcal)
- Carbohydrates: 28 g
- Sugars: 23 g
- Fat: 13 g
- Protein: 4.0 g
Vitamins and minerals
Minerals	Quantity %DV^{†}
Potassium	6% 169 mg
Sodium	0% 0.04 mg
- ^{†}Percentages estimated using US recommendations for adults, except for potassium, which is estimated based on expert recommendation from the National Academies. Source: Streets website

Bubble O'Bill is a brand of packaged frozen dessert sold in Australia and New Zealand, manufactured under Unilever's Streets brand, and formerly available in the United States and United Kingdom under sister brands Good Humor and Wall's respectively.

The name Bubble O'Bill is form of wordplay based on Old West figure Buffalo Bill, the ice cream resembles a cowboy, distinctive for having a gumball in place of a nose.

== Composition ==
The Bubble O'Bill is a moulded ice cream on a stick, resembling a cowboy with a large hat, "Bill". Three flavours of ice cream are used to form the details of a Bubble O'Bill, strawberry for the face, caramel moustache details, and a chocolate hat, with a hole resembling a bullet hole. The reverse of the ice cream is coated with a layer of dark chocolate, a feature added to the product in 2007.

In the place of a nose, a gumball is used, giving the product its name. While its packaging depicts the Bubble O'Bill character with a pink nose, and most marketing shows the product with a green gumball, a variety of colours can be found. The gumball also formerly featured printed "wild west" sayings, such as "Go for your guns" and, "It's a hoe-down".

== History ==
The Bubble O'Bill was first introduced into the US market in 1985 by New Jersey company Good Humor, but achieved particular success in Australia, where it continues to be available, popular for its unique shape and bubblegum nose.

For a period of time, a similar product depicting popular television character Agro with a bubblegum nose was produced by Pauls.

== In popular culture ==
Australian musical comedy trio Tripod have performed a song suggesting Bubble O'Bill's possible hero status.

On season 4 of Drag Race Down Under, contestant Brenda Bressed wore a Bubble O’Bill inspired outfit on the runway, impressing host and judge Michelle Visage.
