= Kibon =

Brazilian ice cream brand

- Product type: Ice cream; Frozen dessert
- Current owner: The Magnum Ice Cream Company
- Country: Brazil
- Introduced: 1941; 85 years ago
- Previous owners: Unilever (until 2025); Kraft Foods Inc. (1990-1997); General Foods (1960-1990); U.S. Harkson (1941-1960)
- Website: www.kibon.com.br/home.html

Kibon is a Brazilian ice cream producer, now owned by The Magnum Ice Cream Company. The logo that it uses is the same Heartbrand logo that Wall's, Good Humor, Streets, Selecta, and Langnese use in the United Kingdom, United States, Australia, Philippines and Germany respectively, also owned by TMICC.

== History ==
Kibon was founded in 1941 by Americans U.S. Harkson and John Kent Lutey. Lutey was the on-site Director and President. The two originally worked together in Shanghai. The original corporate name was U.S. Harkson do Brasil, which was later changed to Cia Harkson Industria e Comercio Kibon. Lutey was Director-President until 1962.

In 1942, Kibon introduced its first ice cream products to Brazil: Eskibon (chocolate-covered ice cream) and Chicabon (chocolate and malt popsicle) with 50 refrigerated pushcarts on the streets of Rio de Janeiro. They were an enormous success and the company grew quickly, introducing classic and tropical flavors. The company also produced dried eggs for food industries. Kibon later introduced a variety of candies, chocolates and gum. By 1960, Kibon was available through more than 3,000 pushcarts as well as retail stores throughout the industrial south of Brazil.

In 1957, Kibon entered into a joint venture with the General Foods Corporation to manufacture and market several of its brands, including Kool-Aid and breakfast cereals. The joint venture was named Indústrias Alimentícias Gerais, S.A., a Brazilian corporation.

In 1960, the General Foods Corporation bought Kibon and Kibon's share of the joint venture.

In 1985, the firm was bought by Philip Morris. And in 1988, Phillip Morris acquired Kraft Foods.

By the 1990s, Kibon was made by the Swiss company Mövenpick.

In 1997, the Anglo-Dutch company Unilever bought Kibon.

In fall 2013, Kibon was scheduled to be sold in the Falkland Islands.

In 2023, the brand transitioned its delivery fleet to electric vehicles.

In 2024, the company advertised their ice cream in Brazil through temporary tattoos applied to the brand's superfans, in an attempt to bypass advertising restrictions on Brazilian beachers.
