= Breyers =

Ice cream brand

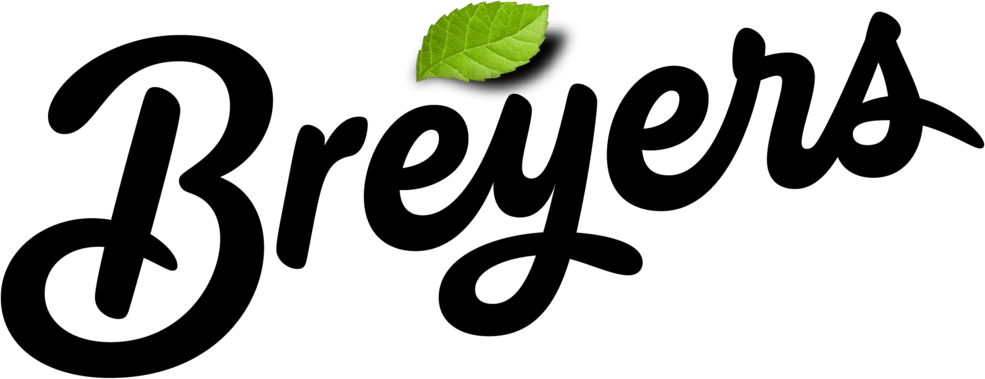
- Brand logo
- Product type: Ice cream and frozen dairy desserts
- Current owner: The Magnum Ice Cream Company
- Country: United States
- Introduced: 1866; 160 years ago
- Previous owners: Unilever
- Website: breyers.com

Breyers is an ice cream and frozen dessert brand with headquarters in Englewood Cliffs, New Jersey. Since 1993, Breyers was owned and managed by the British conglomerate, Unilever, which incorporated Breyers with other Unilever ice cream brands into the Magnum Ice Cream Company in 2025.

Breyers makes ice cream and frozen dairy desserts. Its products range from traditional dairy desserts to those for specialty diet concerns, such as sugar-free, gluten-free, dairy-free, and vegan.

Breyers is one of the ten best-selling ice cream brands globally, and was fourth among American brands in 2022 with sales of $498 million. Founded in 1866, Breyers is the oldest manufacturer of ice cream in the United States.

== History ==
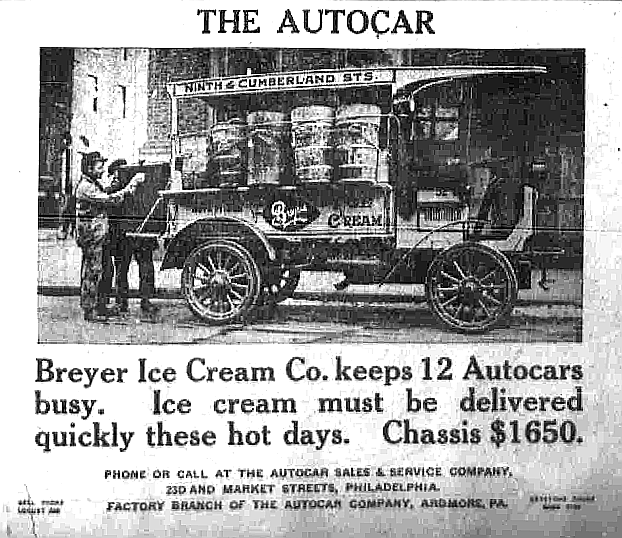
Breyer ice cream truck, c. 1915

In 1866, William A. Breyer began to produce and sell ice cream in Philadelphia, Pennsylvania. Breyers is the oldest manufacturer of ice cream in the United States. The ice cream was originally hand-cranked and made from cream, sugar, fruit, and nuts. He first sold it to his neighbors from his home, and later via horse and wagon on the streets of Philadelphia as demand for the product grew. By 1882, Breyer had five ice cream shops and a delivery service for the product. He opened a wholesale manufacturing plant in 1896.

Breyer's Ice Cream Company was incorporated in 1908. By 1918, the company produced one million gallons of ice cream annually.

Breyer's Ice Cream Company was sold to the National Dairy Products Corporation/Sealtest in 1926. In 1930, National Dairy Products purchased the company that later become known as Kraft in 1976. Kraft sold its ice cream brands to Unilever in 1993.

In 1993, Unilever merged the Breyers ice cream brand with Gold Bond and Good Humor ice cream to create the Good Humor-Breyers division. Unilever closed its last Breyers plant in Philadelphia in 1995. The Good Humor-Breyers headquarters were moved from Green Bay, Wisconsin, and Oakville, Ontario, to Englewood Cliffs, New Jersey, and Toronto in 2007.

In 2013, Unilever introduced frozen dairy desserts, made with additional ingredients and less butterfat, having created this category to provide low-calorie products. The main difference in the new products was lower fat content. US federal regulations require ice cream products with less than 10% butterfat and milk solids to be labeled as frozen dairy dessert instead of ice cream. The new desserts provoked complaints from some customers who preferred the brand's all-natural ice cream products.

=== Market size ===
With $498 million in sales in 2022, Breyers was fourth among American brands. As a single company, Breyers was among the world's top-10 most valued ice cream brands, becoming part of the $9 billion Magnum Ice Cream Company in 2025.

=== The Magnum Ice Cream Company ===
In July 2025, Breyers and other major ice cream brands owned by Unilever, such as Magnum, Ben & Jerry's, and Wall's, were demerged from Unilever into a stand-alone company called The Magnum Ice Cream Company, becoming the world's largest ice cream company with headquarters in Amsterdam, Netherlands.

On 8 December 2025, the shares of The Magnum Ice Cream Company were admitted to the official public listing using the symbol MICC on the Amsterdam, London, and New York Stock Exchanges, having an initial market value of $9.1 billion.

== Products ==
Breyers markets its frozen desserts as either "original ice cream" or "frozen dairy dessert". Some 60% of Breyers products are ice cream and 40% are frozen dairy desserts.

Breyers manufactures products for consumers with specialty diets, such as sugar-free, gluten-free, dairy-free, vegan, non-GMO, lactose-free, and "CarbSmart" for people preferring low-carbohydrate desserts.

Breyers groups its products in three flavor categories that include Classics (made with milk, cream, and natural colors and flavors), Better For You desserts (manufactured to be low in calories with lower carbohydrate content and no sugar added for flavor), and Cookies & Candies (which contain pieces of cookies or branded candies).

=== Ice cream ===
Breyers ice cream products are made from milk, cream, sugar, tara gum, and flavors derived from natural sources, such as vanilla.

=== Frozen dairy dessert ===
Breyers frozen dairy desserts are manufactured with skim milk, corn syrup (or maltitol syrup), sugar or a sugar substitute, polydextrose, glycerin, and various other ingredients that may include whey, carob bean gum, guar gum, carrageenan, and added micronutrients.

== Confusion with Dreyer's ==
In the Western United States, Breyers ice cream may be confused with Dreyer's ice cream, the company cofounded by William Dreyer and Joseph Edy as Edy's Grand Ice Cream in 1928 in Oakland, California. The root of the confusion dates to 1948 when the Edy's Grand Ice Cream name was changed to "Dreyer's Grand Ice Cream". Seeking to eliminate the confusion, Dreyer's changed its brand name in the home market of Breyers from "Dreyer's Grand" back to "Edy's Grand" in 1977, while retaining the Dreyer's brand west of the Rocky Mountains. Around that same time, Breyers had expanded its market into the western United States—the home market of Dreyer's—and by the mid-1980s, was distributing ice cream throughout the region.

== See also ==
- Henry West Breyer Sr. House
- List of ice cream brands
