= Purity Dairies =

American dairy company

- Formerly: Ezell's Dairy (1926–46)
- Company type: Subsidiary
- Industry: Dairy
- Founded: 1926; 100 years ago
- Founder: Miles Ezell
- Fate: Acquired by Dairy Farmers of America
- Headquarters: Nashville, Tennessee, United States
- Key people: Mark Ezell, president
- Products: Milk, sour cream, cheese, butter, ice cream, juices, bottled water
- Number of employees: 500+
- Parent: Dairy Farmers of America
- Website: www.puritydairy.com

Purity Dairies, formerly known as Ezell's Dairy, is a Nashville, Tennessee, United States, based dairy company operated by the Ezell family. It provides products throughout Tennessee, Alabama, and Kentucky. The company is owned by and operates as a subsidiary of Dairy Farmers of America and their products includes milk, cultures, and ice cream, orange juice, lemonade, tea and water, and it is one of the last distributors of the Nutty Buddy ice cream cone. They also once had a partnership deal for home delivery through Plumgood Foods, a now defunct grocery delivery company.

Range of products commercialised by Purity included milk, sour cream, cheese, butter, ice cream, juices, bottled water.

== History ==
In 1926, Dr. C.N. Cowden sold his dairy farm to Miles Ezell after he had rented it for a year, and it was named Ezell's Dairy. By the 1940s, many local dairies had closed due to the requirement of pasteurization, and Ezell's Dairy was one of the few that remained. In 1945, the farm was shut down, but Ezell obtained a small business loan, bought the Green Vale milk plant on Murfreesboro Road, and merged with Rosebank Dairies. In 1946, the company was formally incorporated as "Purity Dairies". Albert Gasser joined the company as President and helped Purity become the dominant milk producer in middle Tennessee.

Purity at one time promoted itself as a provider of "Golden Gernsey" milk. Later, it stressed its "GoldenFlake" buttermilk and won national awards with the product. Purity was one of the first to use HEPA filtration in its cottage cheese production area and this helped to dramatically improve the shelf life of the product. It was the first to use wax-free paper packaging and opaque gallon containers for milk. Purity was also known for creative advertising and used Jim Varney in a series of ads that helped to expand its market penetration, with his character of Ernest P. Worrell becoming an icon in the advertising world.

A sales force was established in the mid-1950s with one man, Tom Pugh, initially becoming the entire force. The force was later expanded to include several other sales professionals who were instrumental in expanding Purity's market share with area retailers.

In the late 1980s in a collaboration with Blue Bell creameries, Purity expanded its line to include an ice cream that became the best seller in the area.

In 1998, the company was purchased by Dean Foods. Members of the Ezell family, one of the founders, are still involved in the management of Purity Dairies.

In 2020, Purity Dairies was acquired by Dairy Farmers of America.
