= Frigo =

Frigo may refer to:

- Frigo (surname)
- A brand of ice cream made by Unilever
- A brand of cheese made by Saputo
