= Inmarko =

Russian ice cream and frozen food producer

- Product type: Ice cream; Frozen dessert
- Current owner: Unilever, Arnest Unirus
- Country: Russia
- Introduced: 1993; 33 years ago
- Discontinued: 2012 (as company)
- Website: www.inmarko.ru

Inmarko (Russian: Инмарко) is a Russian producer of ice cream and frozen foods based in Novosibirsk. Currently owned by Unilever, it has factories in Novosibirsk, Omsk, and Tula and had over 4,500 employees in 2008. It was sold to Unilever in 2008 and ceased to exist as a separate company in 2012.

== History ==
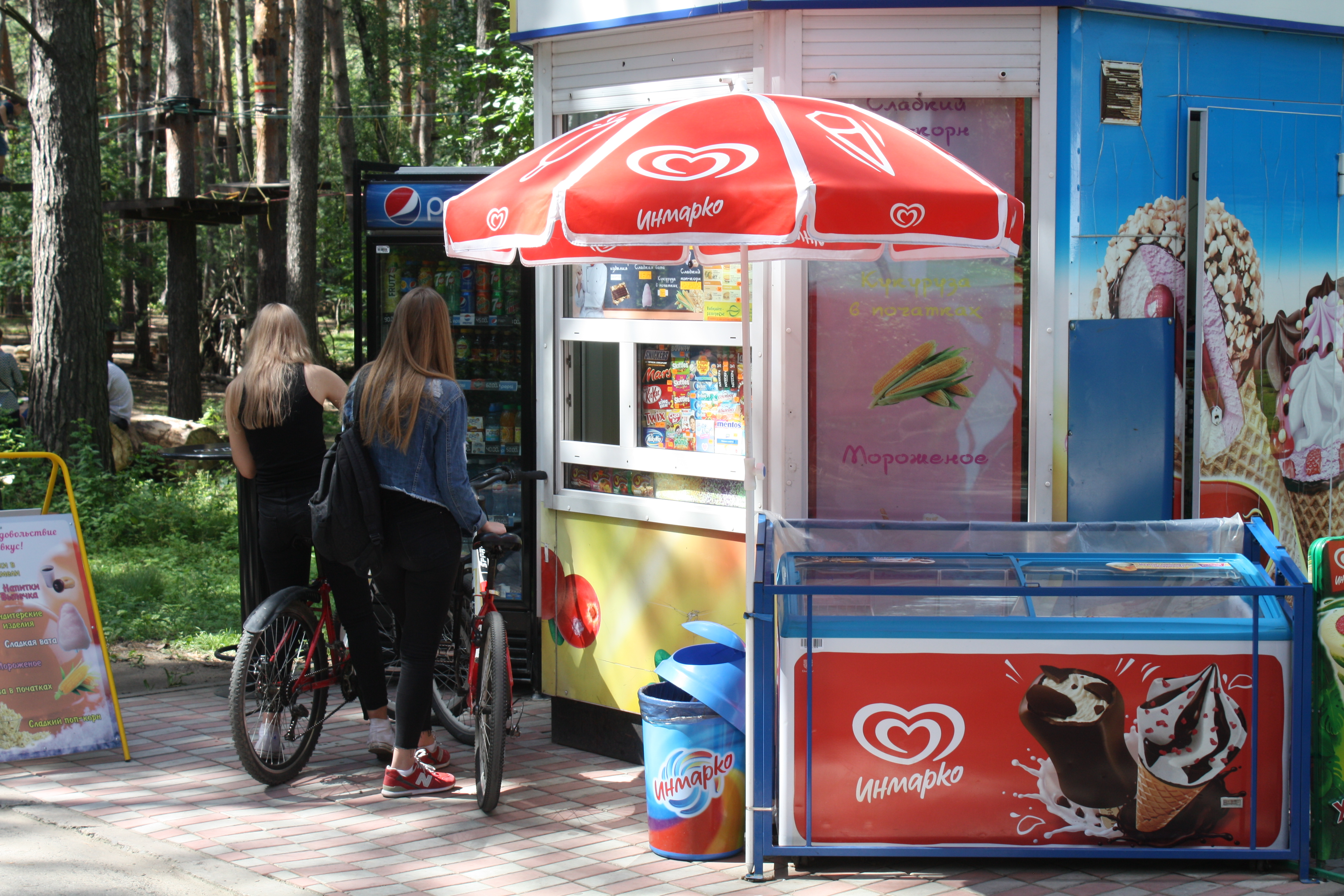
Inmarko Kiosk in Zayeltsovsky Park, Novosibirsk

=== Foundation and Name ===
In 1992, six individuals, including entrepreneurs Vadim Lyubimtsev and Pavel Shutov, founded a business to sell ice cream from street stalls in Novosibirsk. The business was successful due to the lack of competition in the specialized trade for ice cream and subsequently became lucrative.

In 1993, the company name "Inmarko" was registered. The history of this name is unknown, but in the early 1990s in Russia it was considered fashionable to give companies foreign names. There are several versions of the origin of the name; according to one of the founders, the name came to them during a festival. Today, the explanation of the name being a backronym for "investment marketing company" is commonly given.

=== Growth and Expansion ===
Inmarko began as a producer and a distributor. They initially sold ice cream through cold storage facilities in Novosibirsk and later entered into joint ventures with other regional producers. Some time after this, the company began its first retail offerings at eighty locations, all in Novosibirsk.

In 1993, the company turned its attention to foreign imports such as ice creams with a chocolate-nut filling. These had been considered a novelty in Soviet Russia and were now affordable and nationally available. In 1994, Inmarko began to import ice cream, waffle cones, and popsicles from Poland, Denmark, England, Sweden, and Spain, through arrangements with Koral, Augusto, ISCO, Menorquina, and Frideriks. These imports were used to complement the company's ice cream selection, which now included along premium ice cream from Denmark and downmarket offerings from Poland.

In 1994, the company purchased freezers from Denmark and began to sell ice cream kiosks. The kiosks were originally hexagonal, as it was believed this shape would stand out, but the design proved inconvenient to use and was quickly abandoned.

=== Domestic Production ===
In response to a changing customs regime in the mid-1990s, Inmarko began to produce some of its imports domestically. The first Inmarko ice cream factory was constructed in the village of Elite in the Novosibirsk region in 1996. The factory was designed by the Danish firm Frisco, and had a capacity of 5 thousand tons. In addition to ice cream, a designated unit at the factory produced Inmarko's unique packaging. Inmarko did not invest in advertising at the time, believing that the packaging itself was eye-catching enough thanks to its unusually bright design.

Around the same time, Inmarko began to sell its products at grocery stores. The new factory's capacity proved to be insufficient, and in 1997, Inmarko purchase shares of a factory in Omsk at an auction. Frisco worked with Inmarko to upgrade the factory.

Inmarko went on to upgrade the Omsk factory three times; its potential production capacity is now at 50,000 tons.

=== Expansion ===
In the aftermath of the Russian financial crisis in 1998–1999, the many foreign producers abandoned the Russian ice cream market, allowing Inmarko to gain market share. The company expanded its range of ice cream products and began to promote itself in Central Russia. Due to the lack of production capacities and the complexity of delivery in this part of the country, the company ordered from other producers, including competitors.

In 2002, Inmarko created a network of official distributors in Siberia, the Urals, and Central Russia. At this time number of kiosks in Novosibirsk and Omsk had reached 330. In the same year, the company sold 27,145 tons of ice cream domestically, making it a leader in the Russian market.

In 2003, Inmarko established a management company called "Business Development" to attract investors, and the EBRD Norum Fund subsequently acquired a controlling stake in the company for $8 million.

In 2004, Inmarko once again expanded its presence in the Central regions of Russia. More than 1,500 freezer chests were placed at locations in Moscow during that year.

In 2005, Inmarko acquired "Fink," a former distributor of the ice cream brand "Algida" to boost sales in the Central regions. This acquisition added 600 locations in Inmarko's sales network. However, the company faced challenges in the Moscow, which its managers believed to be a comparatively undeveloped ice cream consumer market.

In the mid-2000s, Inmarko sold ₽1 billion in company bonds to raise funds for the repayment of bank loans and for the funding of new investment programs. During this time, the company also began its first television advertising campaign.

By the end of 2005, Inmarko had about 120 product offerings.

In 2006, Inmarko diversified its products by entering the frozen food market with its brand "Have an Idea." Vegetables and berries under this brand were produced under contract by the Polish plant Oerlemans Foods Siemiatycze. The expansion was not hugely successful, and Inmarko has stated that it does not intend to expand its frozen product sales, considering the business to be "unstable and unpromising."

In 2007, the company's revenue was $170 million. That year, the company significantly strengthened its position in the European Russian market after acquiring the JSC "Tula" company. Inmarko undertook a major renovation of the Tula factory, investing $53 million in the project to attain an estimated capacity of 45 thousand tons.

At its height, the company had branches in the cities of Novosibirsk, Omsk, Krasnoyarsk, Novokuznetsk, Kemerovo, Barnaul, Yekaterinburg, Kazan, Moscow and Tula.

In 2008, Unilever officially announced the acquisition of Inmarko. As a result of this agreement, Unilever became the sole owner of the company. On April 4, 2012, the company ceased to exist as a separate legal entity after reorganization.

The Inmarko brand is still used in Russia. According to the company Business Analytics, Inmarko has an 11.8% market share in Russia's 16 largest cities.

== Operation ==
In 2005 the product range consisted of about 100 items.

In 2007 the company's revenue amounted to 170 million US dollars, which allowed the company to occupy 12% of the Russian ice cream market.

== Branches and representative offices ==
As of 2009, the company had production facilities in Tula and Omsk. Branches in the cities of Novosibirsk, Omsk, Krasnoyarsk, Novokuznetsk, Kemerovo, Barnaul, Yekaterinburg, Kazan, Moscow, Tula. According to the Business Analytics research agency, Inmarko controlled 11.8% of sales in kind in Russia (in 16 major cities).

According to the same agency, in the first quarter of 2010, Inmarko's share in the market of large Russian cities exceeded 20%.
