= AMSCOL =

Australian milk and ice cream company

AMSCOL (Adelaide Milk Supply Co-Operative Limited) was a South Australian dairy company. It was particularly well known for its range of ice creams, and its advertising slogan "It's a food, not a fad". It was founded in 1922 and was bought out by Streets in the early 1980s.

== Background ==
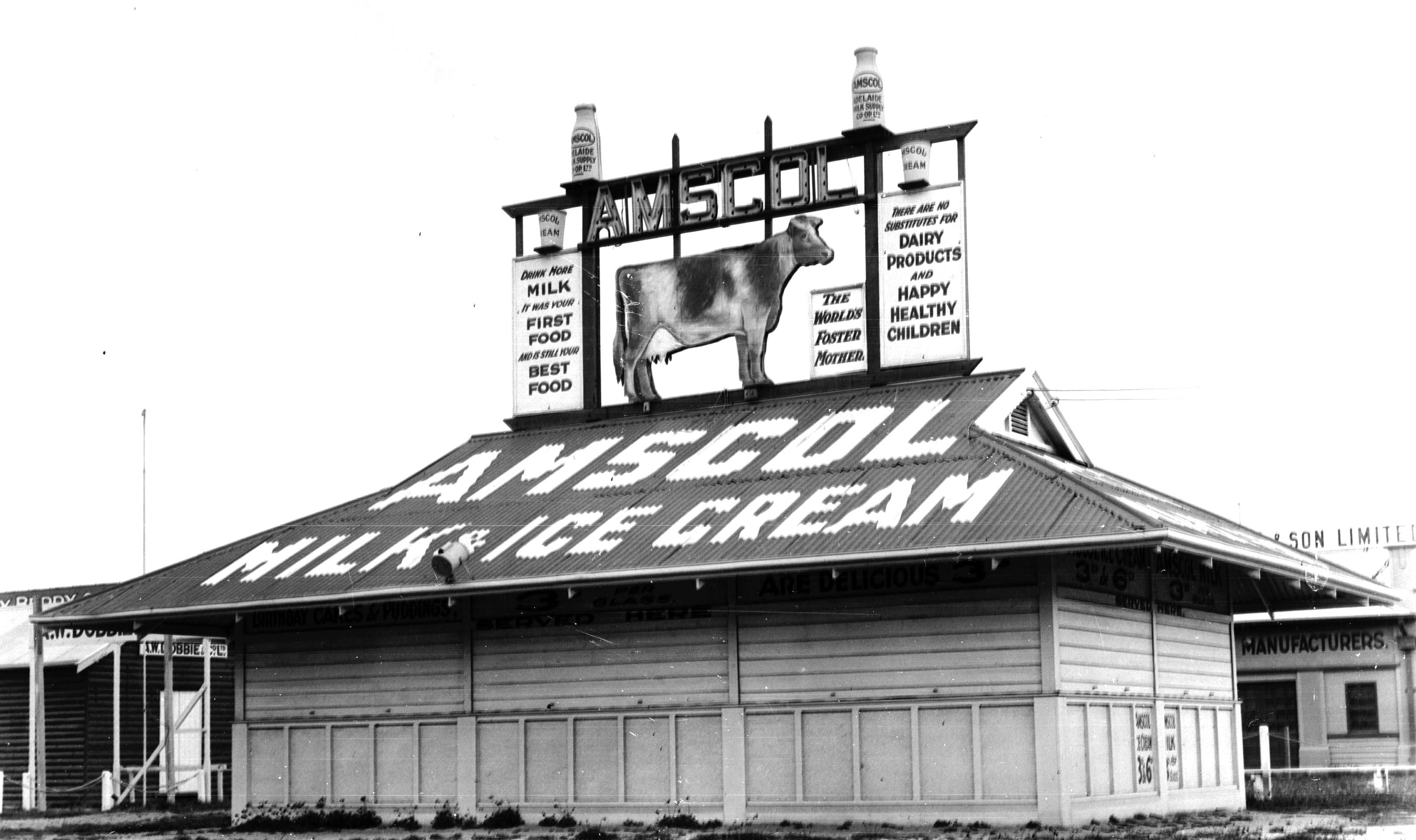
Amscol Milk stand at the 1929 Show

The business that later became AMSCOL was established by the Beauchamp brothers, who operated a milk delivery business from premises at 150 Carrington Street, Adelaide. They were sons of John Beachim Beauchamp (c. 1830 – 7 August 1913) who was married to Jane Caroline Beauchamp, née Baker (c. 1841 – 6 December 1897). In 1876 the Beauchamp family migrated from Somerset, U.K. to South Australia and, after failing as farmers, they purchased a dairy on Junction Road, Rosewater, where the younger brothers spent their childhood. The Beauchamp brothers included Herbert, Frank, George, Walter, Harry, and Richard. One brother, George W. Beauchamp left for the United States around 1906 and founded a thriving ice cream business in Chicago. By 1926, he was a major shareholder in the Whelan Icecream Company and Hydrox Dairy Corporation, but had little day-to-day involvement.

Walter John Chancellor Beauchamp (21 August 1884 – 25 January 1966), started work delivering milk for James Anderson in Melbourne for three and a half years. On returning to Adelaide in 1909, he purchased a horse and milk cart and soon had a daily "round" of 120 customers, delivering 110 litres (24 gallons) before 8:30am. He brought in several of his brothers to operate the business. The Beauchamp Brothers and Anderson (as Anderson & Co.) were competitors in 1915, but combined in 1917 as Adelaide Milk Supply Company, employing 35 men, including 28 carters.

== Company history ==
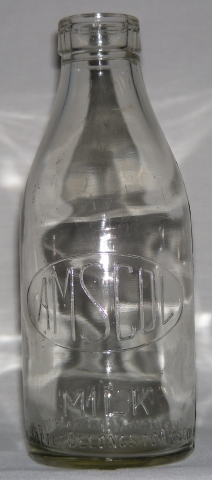
1 pint (568 ml) AMSCOL milk bottle

In January 1921, a dairy manager in Enfield, P. C. Manuel, helped set up the Wholesale Milk Producers' Association. In 1922, 579 (or 94%) of the milk producers agreed to purchase an established milk distribution company (so that supply could be controlled from production to distribution) and decided on A. M. S. C.. The new company, now renamed AMSCOL, was set up on the co-op model, with farmers supplying more or less milk depending on the number of shares held and being paid according to its butterfat content.

Manuel and Walter Beauchamp became directors, with Harry Beauchamp as depot manager in Murray Bridge. The only other brother who figures prominently in the company is Francis Charles Zebedee Steeds "Frank" Beauchamp (1879 – 27 September 1949), who was employed as works manager. Woodside butter factory was also purchased at this time, adding butter and cheese production to the business.

By 1922 the company had 41 carts delivering a total of 18,000 litres (4,000 gallons) daily to 26,000 homes. They also supplied 50 vendors and eight or nine milk shops. George W. Beauchamp returned to Adelaide in 1927 to help his brother install new ice cream plant and block ice manufacturing machinery capable of producing 70 tons of clear ice daily (this was 30 years before most houses had an electric refrigerator). He also advised on delivery of milk in bottles, rather than doling it out into "billy cans". The co-op also began supplying bottled milk (1/3 pint – 190 ml) to schools as part of governmental health initiatives.

Popular items from the 1950s included ice cream blocks (convenient for early square-shaped freezer compartments), Dandies, Eskimo Pies, Dairy Chocs, Hi Tops, Twin Chocs, and Berry Bars.

In 1978, rival cooperative dairies SA Farmers Union and Dairy Vale purchased the company as competition increased. In 1982, the company was purchased by Streets, a subsidiary of the British company Unilever. In 2012, the brand was sold to private interests who revived it as part of their restaurant business.
