= Kwality Wall's =

Indian food company

- Type: Public Subsidiary
- Traded as: NSE: KWIL; BSE: 544622
- Industry: Food
- Founded: 1956; 70 years ago
- Headquarters: Mumbai, Maharashtra, India
- Products: Frozen desserts
- Owner: The Magnum Ice Cream Company (61.9%)
- Parent: Hindustan Unilever Limited (1995–2025); The Magnum Ice Cream Company (2025–present)
- Website: kwalitywalls.in

Kwality Wall's is an Indian multinational frozen desserts company. It is majority owned by The Magnum Ice Cream Company, which acquired it from Indian consumer goods company Hindustan Unilever in 2025. It is a major producer and distributor of frozen dessert products in India, Bangladesh, Bhutan, Brunei, Myanmar, Nepal, Sri Lanka, Thailand, Singapore and Malaysia. In Pakistan and Bangladesh, it is known simply as "Wall's".

== History ==
Kwality, the original Indian company, was founded in 1956, and was the first in the region to import machinery for the mass production and sale of ice cream on a commercial scale. In 1995, in view of the growth potential of the frozen confections market, Kwality entered into an agreement with Hindustan Unilever, and has since been known by its current umbrella name. Its name was created out of two previously separate independent companies that Unilever took over: Kwality of India and Wall's of United Kingdom that constituted larger ice cream business for Unilever. At the same time, other brands acquired by Hindustan Unilever, such as Gaylord-Milkfood, were phased out in favour of promoting the Kwality Wall's brand. This arrangement allows for local production and sale of Wall's products that are popular in its home market, such as the Cornetto cone, and to create local variations on others, such as the Feast Jaljeera Blast. Kwality Wall's was ranked 464th among India's most trusted brands according to the Brand Trust Report 2012, a study conducted by Trust Research Advisory. In the Brand Trust Report 2013, Kwality Wall's was ranked 632nd among India's most trusted brands and subsequently, according to the Brand Trust Report 2014, Kwality Wall's was ranked 382nd among India's most trusted brands.

In August 2013, Kwality Wall's extended to Bangladesh, Bhutan, Brunei and Nepal.

As part of larger restructuring Unilever divested all of its ice cream business worldwide and created The Magnum Ice Cream Company. As part of regional process, Hindustan Unilever also divested its ice cream business to create Kwality Walls India Limited.

== Logo ==
Logo used for Kwality Wall's was a slight variation from that used by the other Heartbrand products, in that there are two distinct hearts in the Kwality Wall’s logo (with the inner heart being closed but the outer heart having a gap), rather than a single stroke forming both hearts. Heartbrand logo is used on the Kwality Wall's India website, but the logo variant is used on products.

== See also ==
- List of frozen dessert brands
