= Miko (ice cream) =

French ice cream brand

- Product type: Ice cream; Frozen dessert
- Current owner: The Magnum Ice Cream Company
- Country: France
- Introduced: 1920; 106 years ago
- Previous owners: Unilever (until 2025)
- Website: www.miko.fr/home.html

Miko is a French ice cream brand and company owned by The Magnum Ice Cream Company, originally created by Luis Ortiz in Saint-Dizier in the 1920s.

Miko is the official ice cream supplier of Disneyland Paris.

== History ==
Miko's origins lie in the emigration of the Spanish Ortiz family to France in the 1920s. Some settled in 1919 in Deauville and Trouville, Normandy, where they created Glaces Pompon. One of their cousins, Luis Ortiz (1889–1948), born in San Pedro del Romeral, established himself as a traveling merchant in Saint-Dizier (Haute-Marne) in 1921. He drove his street vendor's cart there to sell his roasted chestnuts, complementing this activity by making ice cream.

At the same time, the American Christian K. Nelson discovered the property of coconut oil used to fix the chocolate around the stick, and created the 'Eskimo'. A cousin of the Ortiz imported the idea in 1925, giving birth to the Ortiz stick.

Parents and children criss-crossed the region aboard scooters. The sale of ice cream increased after the Liberation of France during World War II. American troops were numerous in Saint-Dizier and G.Is discovered Ortiz ice creams. The success continued with the sale of Miko in fairgrounds and cinemas. Wanting to modernize the brand, the Ortiz renamed their ice cream Miko in 1951 (a contraction of two nicknames: that of the son of a family associate, Michel nicknamed Mik and that of his dog whose name ended with Ko).

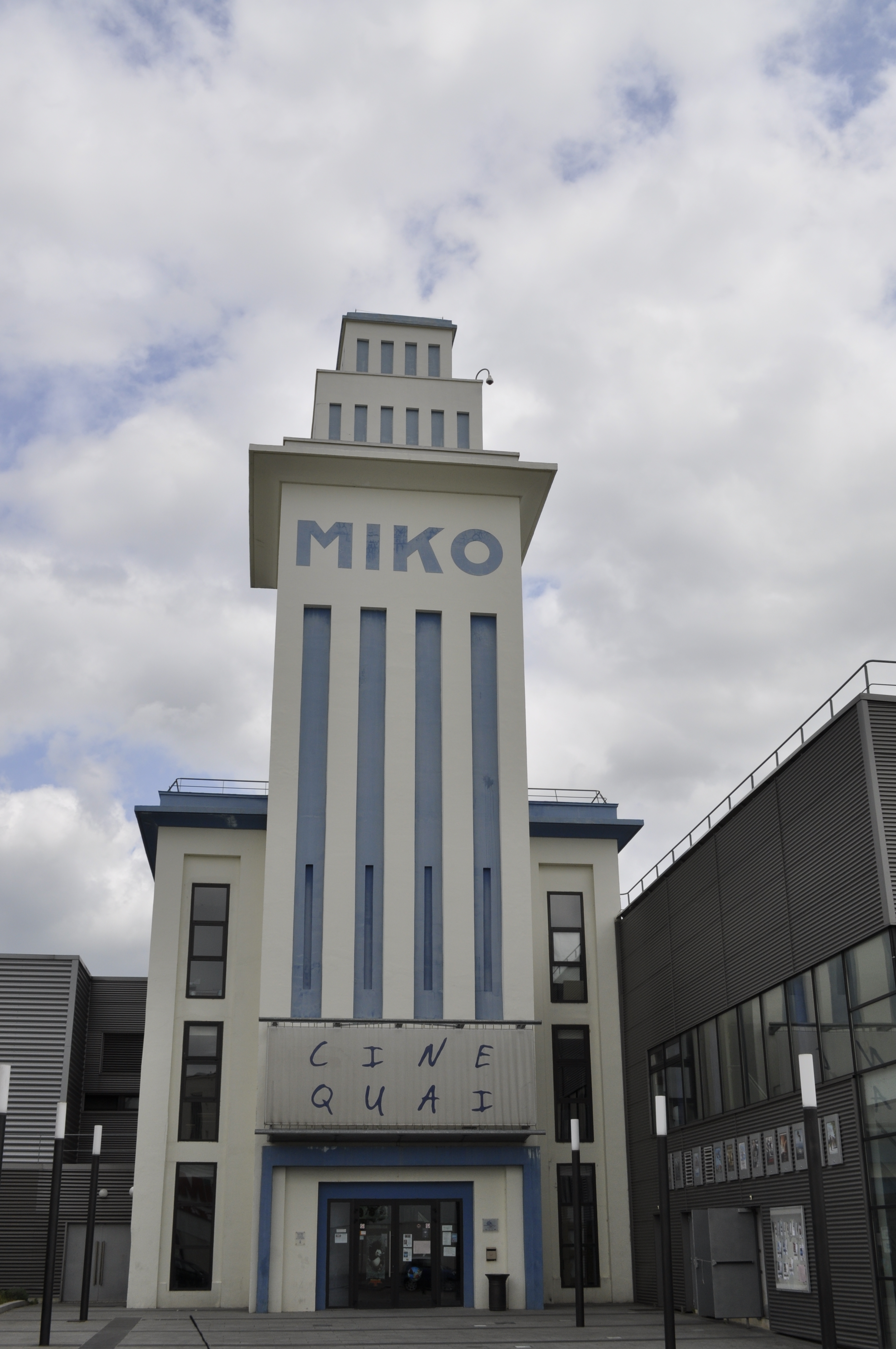
Miko Tower, Saint-Dizier

To respond to the development of sales, they bought the Brasserie de Fort Carré (formerly a brewery in St. Dizier) and in 1954 installed a factory and automated machines imported from America for the manufacture of ice cream. The "big merchant from Saint-Dizier" even won ahead of the three industrial groups Motta (from Italy), Nestlé and Unilever.

In the 1970s and 1980s, the Ortiz-Miko company sponsored cycling teams and the Tour de France. The company employed 1,100 people and supplies 10,000 points of sale. In 1986, it bought the Nantes ice cream manufacturer Frigécrème from BSN (now Danone). In 1990, Miko was the leading French group in very cold food products with 6,000 employees and 5 billion francs in turnover. The company exports and has a foothold on all continents: American (Canada), African (Egypt, Senegal, Reunion, Djibouti), Oceanic (New Caledonia) and Asian (Japan, Korea).

With the Ortiz heirs fighting over the inheritance, the declining company was bought in 1994 for 413 million euros by Unilever (a group that owns the Cornetto, Motta and Carte d'Or brands). It is integrated into COGESAL, the group's frozen food division, renamed COGESAL-MIKO on this occasion. Miko subsequently replaced the group's ice cream brand, Motta. The Miko factory moved to the Trois-Fontaines industrial zone, still in Saint-Dizier. The MIKO tower of the former factory is today a Miko museum and a cinema.
