= Wibbly Wobbly Wonder =

Ice-cream product

The Wibbly Wobbly Wonder was an ice cream on a stick which was marketed in Ireland in the 1970s, 1980s and 1990s. It was made by HB Ice Cream, having been conceived in 1974 as a cost saving measure by Gerry Keegan, an accountant at the company at the time. It was taken off the market in the late 1990s, before being made and marketed again briefly as part of HB's 80th anniversary celebrations in 2006.

The lower half of a Wibbly Wobbly Wonder was divided between pink strawberry and yellow banana flavoured ice cream, with the upper half consisting of frozen yellow lemon jelly, coated in chocolate.

German retailer Aldi retails a similar product called "Jiggly Pops".

== See also ==
- List of ice cream brands
