= Ola South Africa =

South African ice cream brand name

Ola
- Product type: Ice cream
- Current owner: The Magnum Ice Cream Company
- Country: South Africa
- Related brands: Gino Ginelli; Cornetto; Vienetta; Joy! by Ola; Magnum; Rich 'n Creamy; Paddlepop
- Markets: South Africa
- Previous owners: Unilever (until 2025)

Ola is a South African ice cream brand name that is part of The Magnum Ice Cream Company. It falls under the "Heartbrand" group of brands.

Heartbrand ice creams are sold in over 40 countries around the world under various local brand names, including Wall's and Algida.

== History ==
In 2003, Ola acquired the Milky Lane and Juicy Lucy brands.

In November 2024, Ola South Africa became an official season partner of Cricket South Africa. On March 19, 2024, Unilever spun off its ice cream business, which included several Magnum, Ben & Jerry's, and Heartbrand brands, including Ola.

== Products ==
Ola South Africa sells tubs, cones, and popsicles in South Africa, including:

- Ola chocolate, neopolitan, and vanilla tubs
- Gino Ginelli strawberry pavlova, and hazelnut praline tubs
- Cornetto chocolate, and vanilla sugar cones
- Ola Choc Pie and Caramel Pie ice creams
- Vienetta vanilla frozen dessert
- Joy! by Ola caramel, milkshake, tropical delight, and chocolate ice creams
- Magnum classic, almond, and white almond ice creams and mini ice cream packs
- Rich 'n Creamy vanilla and chocolate tubs
- Paddlepop orange popsicles
- Paddlepop raspberry tubes
