= Magnum (ice cream) =

Brand of ice cream products

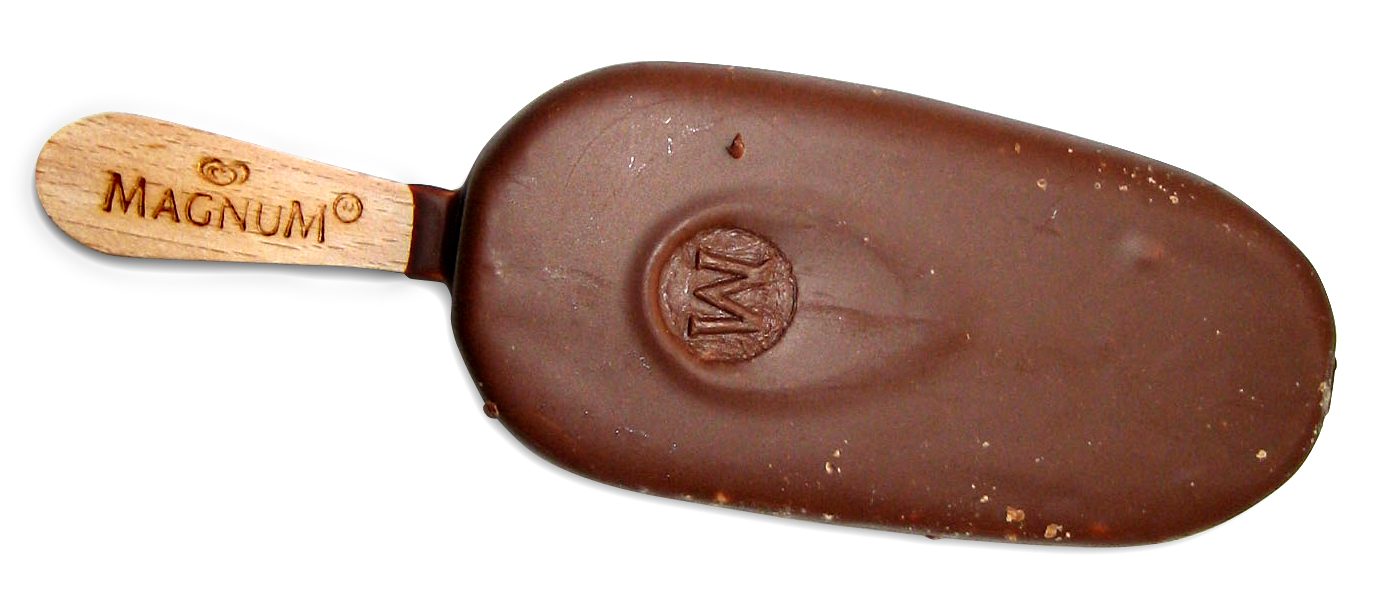
- Product type: Ice cream
- Current owner: The Magnum Ice Cream Company
- Country: Denmark
- Introduced: 1989
- Markets: Worldwide
- Previous owners: Unilever (until 2025)
- Tagline: "True to pleasure."
- Website: www.magnumicecream.com

Magnum is a brand of ice cream and the company's namesake, originally developed and produced by Frisko in Aarhus, Denmark, a part of the Dutch company The Magnum Ice Cream Company (TMICC). It is sold as part of the Heartbrand line of products, which is owned by TMICC and is available in sticks, tubs, and bites. In Greece, the Magnum brand name has been owned by the Swiss company Nestlé since 2005-2006 following the acquisition of the Delta Ice Cream company, so the Unilever/TMICC ice cream uses the name Magic.

As of 2026, Magnum is the world's best-selling brand of ice cream.

== History ==
The ice cream today known as Magnum was developed in Aarhus, Denmark, in the late 1980s by Mogens Vigh-Larsen (1935–2019), then technical director of Frisko, which is an ice cream maker. It was put into production in autumn 1988 and originally manufactured by Frisko in Denmark. The original Magnum (later rebranded as Magnum Classic) consisted of a thick bar of vanilla ice cream on a stick, with a chocolate coating. As there was no real chocolate that could stand the temperature of −40 degrees Celsius without either cracking or being too hard to consume, an ad hoc chocolate-like substance had to be developed. In 1987, bio-engineer Geert Debevere at Unilever Belgium solved this problem by adding extra milk fat to a chocolate coating, which made the thin coating less likely to crack, thus inventing the first Magnum with real chocolate. The original Magnum had a weight of 86 grams and a volume of 120 ml. The Aarhus factory was converted into apartments, shops, and a fitness centre named "Friskohus" (The Frisko House) after the ice cream company brand. The Frisko brand is still used in Denmark.

The company also started selling Magnum ice cream cones in 1994 and an ice cream sandwich in 2002.

On March 19, 2024, Unilever announced it would divest its ice cream brands and cut 7,500 jobs in order to make "a simpler, more focused and higher performing Unilever." Included in the spin-off are Ben & Jerry's, Cornetto, Magnum, Talenti, and Wall's. The divestment was completed in December 2025. The new company is known as "The Magnum Ice Cream Company".

== Varieties ==
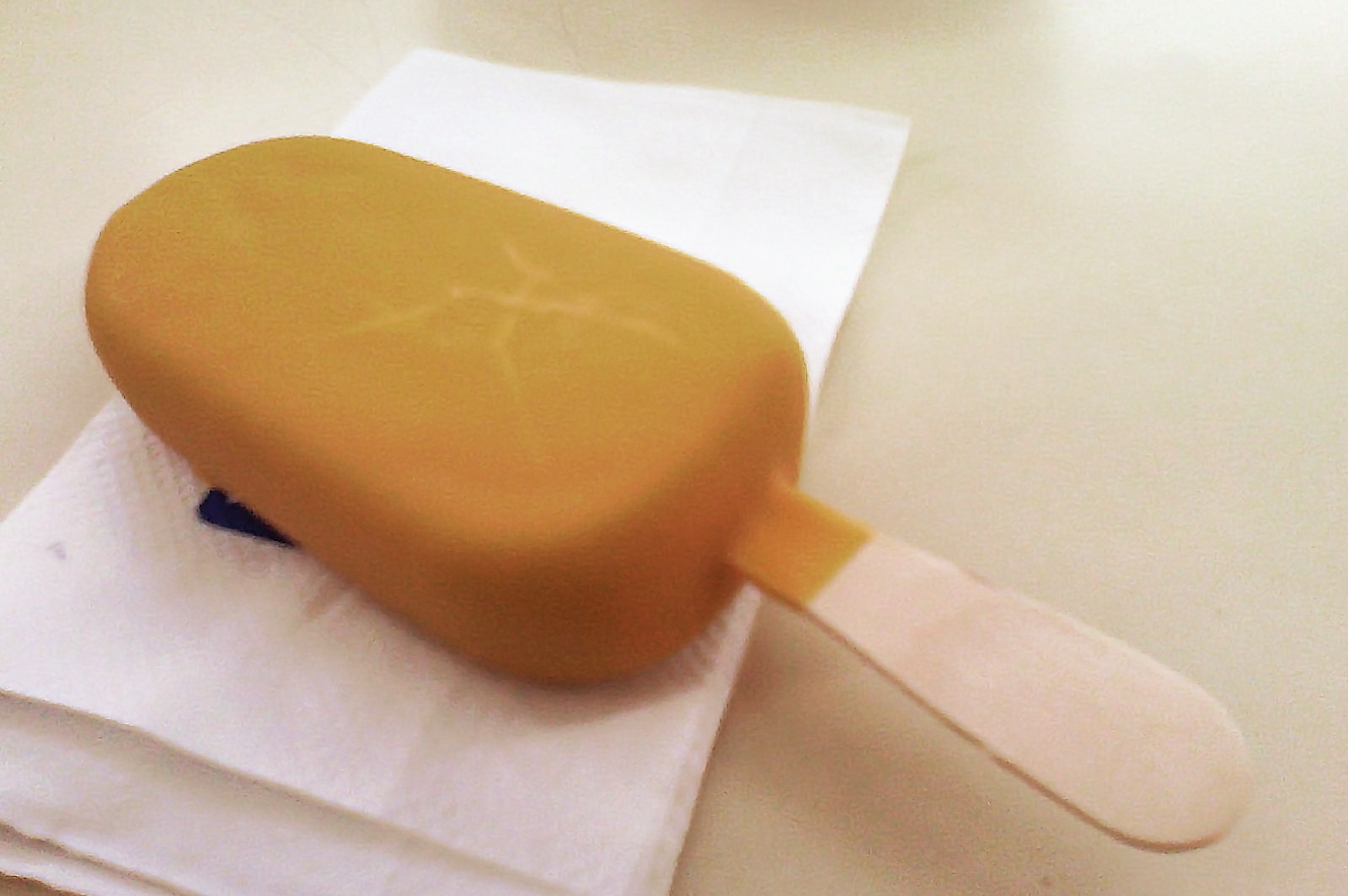
A Magnum Gold ice cream bar

Starting in 1992, the company added Almond, Double Chocolate, and White amongst other flavours. In 2002, Magnum branched into frozen yogurt with its raspberry fruit swirl covered in milk chocolate. Moments were introduced which were bite-size ice cream treats with caramel, chocolate, or hazelnut centres, followed later in the year by "mini", "crunchy" (with almonds), and "light". Late 2002 saw the launch of Magnum Intense, a chocolate truffle center enveloped in ice cream and covered with chocolate, and the limited edition 7 Deadly Sins series of ice creams, whose flavours were named after the seven deadly sins. Sins were followed by another limited edition range in 2005 in which each flavour was named after one of the senses: Magnum Aroma, Magnum Touch, Magnum Sound, Magnum Taste, and Magnum Sight.

In 2003, Streets, the brand under which Magnum is sold in Australia and New Zealand, brought out a limited edition series of ice creams known as The Sixties Nine featuring sixties-related names: John Lemon, Wood Choc, Jami Hendrix, ChocWork Orange, Peace ManGO, Cinnaman on the Moon, Cherry Guevara, Candy Warhol and Guava Lamp. Consumers who collected nine of these ice cream sticks could send them off to get a free Magnum T-shirt. The extreme popularity of the ChocWork Orange resulted in Streets selling it as the "Chocolate Orange" Magnum for some time after the remainder of the range was discontinued. Similarly, the Peppermint Envy of the Seven Deadly Sins range became "Peppermint" and is still available in Australia today.

In 2008, Magnum brought out new variants in the UK — Mayan Mystica, a chocolate ice cream Magnum blended with cinnamon, nutmeg, and honey flavours; and Magnum Minis available in a variety of flavours.

In 2018, Magnum launched its first vegan ice creams in two flavours, Magnum Vegan Classic and Magnum Vegan Almond. The new product was first released in Finland and Sweden, followed by the UK.

In 2020, Magnum launched new variants Rose Ruby and Salted Caramel. These are produced in a tub with a crackable outside chocolate layer.

In August 2024, Magnum brought new flavours Lemon Cheese and Pecan Nut in Singapore.

In March 2026, Magnum announced the release of new flavours Signature Pistachio and Signature Peach in the United Kingdom.

== Advertising ==
Actress Eva Longoria was the face of Magnum in 2008. Also in 2008, Josh Holloway was selected as the first male spokesperson of Magnum in Turkey. Benicio del Toro and Caroline Correa starred in a television commercial for Magnum Gold, directed by Bryan Singer.

In 2021, on the occasion of the 700th anniversary of Dante Alighieri's death, a new limited edition was launched that included three ice creams, each inspired by each of the three Cantiche of the Divine Comedy. To celebrate the anniversary, in partnership with the Scuderie del Quirinale, a work was also commissioned to the Italian painter Roberto Ferri, who created Il Bacio di Dante e Beatrice (The Kiss of Dante and Beatrice). The painting was exhibited at the Palazzo Firenze in Rome.

== Internationally ==
In 2009, Magnum Mini Moments were launched. They came in three types of chocolate: milk, white and dark all with five different flavours including almond and truffle. In China, the Magnum name is retained; however, there are fewer varieties—as of 2009 there are only vanilla, cappuccino, and crunchy. Mint and double chocolate were introduced in 2006–7 but were pulled from the market in 2008 (or possibly before).

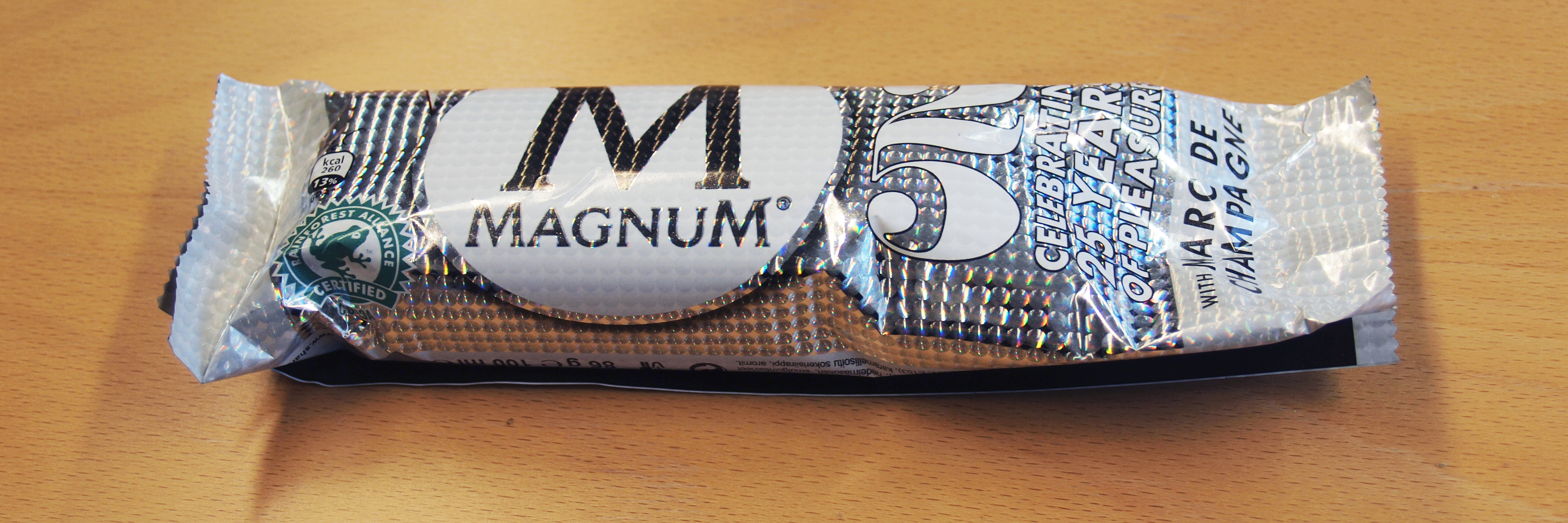
Magnum Marc de Champagne ice cream was introduced in 2014.

In 2011, Magnum ice cream was launched in the US and Canada with six varieties: Double Caramel, Double Chocolate, Classic, Almond, White, and Dark.

In March 2012, Malaysia introduced a flavor known as Choco-Cappucino.

In April 2013, Magnum ice cream was launched in India by Hindustan Unilever, starting with Chennai, and February the following year, it expanded to national distribution. It is distributed under the brand name Kwality Wall's (ice cream).

In 2014, The Philippines opened a "make-your-own" or "do-it-yourself" Magnum dessert bar/cafe called Magnum Manila, located at SM Aura's Sky Park, Taguig.
