= Roberto Ferri =

Italian artist and painter

Roberto Ferri (born 1978) is an Italian artist and painter from Taranto, Italy, who is deeply inspired by Baroque painters, in particular Caravaggio, and other old masters of Romanticism, the Academy, and Symbolism.

== Biography ==
Ferri graduated from the Liceo Artistico Lisippo Taranto in 1996, a local art school in his hometown. He began to study painting on his own and moved to Rome in 1999, to increase research on ancient painting, beginning at the end of the 16th century, in particular. In 2006, he graduated with honours from the Academy of Fine Arts in Rome.

His work is represented in important private collections in Rome, Milan, London, Paris, New York, Madrid, Barcelona, Miami, San Antonio (Texas), Qatar, Dublin, Boston, Malta, and the Castle of Menerbes in Provence. His work was featured in the controversial Italian pavilion of the Venice Biennale 2011, and has exhibited at Palazzo Cini, Venice, in the Kitsch Biennale 2010.

In 2021, on the occasion of the 700th anniversary of Dante Alighieri's death, he created Il Bacio di Dante e Beatrice (The Kiss of Dante and Beatrice in Italian), a work that seals the sublimation of a kiss that never happened, with the painter's choice of Italian model and actor Edoardo Sferrella as a reference for the figure of the Supreme Poet; the painting was commissioned by Magnum for the MagnumXDante campaign in partnership with the Scuderie del Quirinale, and exhibited at Palazzo Firenze in Rome.

== Bibliography ==
- Roberto Ferri: oltre i sensi by Roberto Ferri, Fabio Isman, Italian Cultural Institute (London, England), Palazzo del Vittoriano (Rome, Italy), Italian Cultural Institute (New York, N.Y.), 2009; ISBN 88-572-0211-9.

== See also ==
- List of Italian painters
- Baroque painting
- The Kitsch Movement
