= Twister (ice cream) =

Ice cream made by The Magnum Ice Cream Company

- Product type: Ice cream lollipop
- Current owner: The Magnum Ice Cream Company
- Produced by: The Magnum Ice Cream Company
- Introduced: 1982
- Markets: Worldwide
- Previous owners: Unilever (until 2025)

The Twister (originally "Tangle Twister") is an ice cream lollipop on a stick, launched in 1982 and made by The Magnum Ice Cream Company. It is pineapple ice cream and lime flavoured fruit ice on the outside and strawberry fruit ice on the inside and is shaped in a spiral. The product is no longer plant based, since a recipe change in February 2026, now contains skimmed milk powder so is no longer suitable for vegans or those with milk allergy or lactose intolerance.

== Variations ==
A smaller version, the "Mini Twister", is available in multipacks. Some Mini Twisters in each pack have the flavours reversed, so that the strawberry appears on the outside. A "Twister Blackcurrant" variety with a combination of strawberry vanilla, lemon, and blackcurrant flavours is available in the United Kingdom. A "Twister Choc" variety with a combination of vanilla, chocolate, and caramel flavours was available in the United Kingdom. In March 2008, Unilever launched a plum and anise flavoured Twister, which lasted only two months before being withdrawn following poor sales. In 2023, two new flavours were launched: "Twister Fruit Zingerrr", a purple, green and yellow fruit ice in a combination of tangy apple, sour lemon and sweet blueberry flavours, and "Twister Peek-A-Blue", a blue, yellow and pink fruit ice with apple-blueberry, refreshing melon and sweet strawberry-lemon flavours.

== In popular culture ==
The Twister Coaster ride at the West Midland Safari Park formerly had decorative elements that echo the Twister lolly. However, the ride has since been renamed to "Monkey Mayhem" and the branding removed. The roller coaster is of the Wild Mouse design.

A video game was published in the Czech Republic by Algida, promoting the Twister ice cream in that country. The game received attention when it was played by Swedish online streamer Vargskelethor Joel, part of the streaming group Vinesauce.
