= Paddle Pop Adventures =

Thai animated television series

- Also known as: Max Adventures
- Genre: Animated sitcom Fantasy; Adventure; Comedy
- Written by: Gerard Maurez; Lee Croudy; Salvador Simó; Gary Sparks
- Directed by: Tod Polson; Salvador Simó
- Composers: Pantawit Kiangsiri; Erick Schroder
- Country of origin: Thailand
- Original languages: English; Thai

Production
- Producers: Chadaporn Mitinunwong; Suponwich Juck Somsaman; Valthip Srinaka
- Production companies: The Monk Studios (2007-2012, 2014-present); Egg Story Studios (2013-2014); Unilever

Paddle Pop Adventures, also known as Max Adventures, is a Thai animated television series that saw its first release in 2005. Based on the mascot of the Australian ice cream brand Paddle Pop from manufacturer Streets, named the Paddle Pop Lion, the series was produced by The Monk Studios and Egg Story Studios (in 2013-2014) and is owned by the British-Dutch company Unilever. The series was used to promote the brand worldwide.

It was launched in more than 33 countries including Indonesia, Spain, France, India, Italy, Portugal and Brazil. In Australia, the series was called Paddle Pop Adventures, where each season was condensed into a single movie.

Paddle Pop: Cyberion was the first appearance of Paddle Pop in CGI, released in 2007, with the rest of the series following this trend. Paddle Pop: Kombatei was released in 2009 as 13 episodes under the original title Max Adventures. Each episode ranged around the 8 minute mark. Following serial releases such as Paddle Pop: Begins and Paddle Pop: Magilika were also as short episodes, which were later condensed into films. The films were dubbed from Indonesian into English and renamed from Max Adventures to Paddle Pop Adventures for an Australian audience.

In Brazil, the episodes for Paddle Pop: Begins (2011) and following releases were adapted by Unilever to be aired on Nickelodeon. In Indonesia, Paddle Pop: Begins was released in cinema in 2011. In 2012, Begins and following serial releases were condensed and renamed to the precursor title Petualangan Singa Pemberani and released in Indonesian movie theatres such as Cinema XXI in 2D, 3D and 4D formats.

== Synopsis ==
The story follows the adventures of Max, or Paddle Pop, a young lion heir to the throne of the Lion Kingdom. He lost his parents to the antagonist Shadow Master, who had attempted to steal the Lion Crystals and achieve supreme power. However Max is saved by his tutor Professor Higgabottom. Together, he and his friends Higgabottom, Leena, Twitch, Spike, Kara and others attempt to collect the crystals themselves and stop the Shadow Master.

== Movies ==
The main set of movies are animated in 3D.

- Paddle Pop: Galaktika (2005) - 102 minutes long.
- Paddle Pop: Magilika (2006) - 2D animated. ~36 minutes long.
- Paddle Pop: Cyberion (2007) - 30 minutes long.
- Paddle Pop: Pyrata (2008) - 45 minutes long.
- Paddle Pop: Kombatei (2009) - Originally released as 13 eight-minute episodes. 92 minutes long.
- Paddle Pop: Elemagika (2010) - Originally released as 13 eight-minute episodes. 92 minutes long.
- Paddle Pop: Begins (2011) - Originally released as 11 twenty-minute episodes tied with Paddle Pop: Begins 2. These episodes were later split in half to make two full movies. Episode 1 was released in April 2011. Paddle Pop: Begins (2011) is 108 minutes long.
- Paddle Pop: Begins 2 (2012)
- Paddle Pop: Dinoterra (2013) - 103 minutes long.
- Paddle Pop: Magilika (2014) - 86 minutes long.
- Paddle Pop: Magilika 2 (2014)
- Paddle Pop: Atlantos (2015) - 90 minutes long.
- Paddle Pop: Atlantos 2 (2016) - Originally released as 11 twenty-four minute episodes. 85 minutes long.
- Paddle Pop: Imagira (2024) - Web series/reboot.
- Paddle Pop: Game On! (2025) - Web series.

=== Spin-offs ===
- The New Adventures of Paddle Pop/The New Adventures of Max (2017) - A television show set in high school. 45 minutes long.

== Video games ==
- Paddle Pop: Pyrata - An ARG based on the movie. It was handed out to people purchasing Paddle Pop ice cream, which was a confectionery product at the time.
- Paddle Pop : Rise of the Lions - A level-based mobile game.
- Max Dash (2014-2016) - A swiping mobile game.
- Max Adventures: World of Paddle Pop (2014-2016)

== Characters ==
- Max/Paddle Pop - The lion protagonist of the series. Max is the prince (later king) of the Lion Kingdom, being the son of King Adisa and Queen Shifa, and the only survivor of the family, having been rescued by Professor Higgabottom as a baby during the attack of the Shadow Master and being taken to a forest. Early in the series, he goes on a journey to collect the Lion Crystals along with Leena, Professor Higgabottom, Twitch, Spike and Kara to defeat and deter the Shadow Master. Voiced by Ittiporn Lakarnsure (English); Giring Ganesha (Indonesian); Ankur Javeri (Hindi; commercials).
- Leena/Liona - A young lioness pilot of the Phoenix Ship. Like Max, she is also an orphan, having lost her father Lionel as a child by the army of the Shadow Master and being cared for by Professor Higgabottom in a hidden underground city. She helps Max on his journey in search of the Lion Crystals, carrying him and his friends in her ship. Voiced by Natasha Oong Pattamapongs (English); Rachel Amanda (Indonesian; Paddle Pop: Kombatei, Paddle Pop: Magilika); Putri Titian (Indonesian; Paddle Pop: Begins, Paddle Pop: Begins 2); Chelsea Olivia (Indonesian; Paddle Pop: Dinoterra); Yuki Kato (Indonesian; Paddle Pop: Atlantos); Pamela Ankur Javeri (Hindi; commercials).
- Professor Higgabottom - A wise old owl and longtime friend of Max's parents. He was responsible for saving Max from the Shadow Master and hiding in a forest, besides taking care of Leena after the loss of her father. He sends Max on his journey in search of Lion Crystals to stop the Shadow Master. Voiced by David J. Smith (English); Elsa Surya (Indonesian).
- Twitch and Spike - The goofy best friends of Max. Twitch is a blue chameleon and a wily troublemaker who is always seen with Spike, and seems to like Leena. Spike is a large, mindless porcupine who is preoccupied with eating and is very slow. Voiced by Arie Dagienkz (Indonesian; Twitch); Salman (Indonesian; Spike; Paddle Pop: Dinoterra); Hamzah (Indonesian; Spike; Paddle Pop: Atlantos).
- Kara - An elephant assistant from the Lion Kingdom. He joined the team shortly after Max gets the first crystal to serve him in the journey since then. Voiced by Lee Croudy (English); Dewanshya (Indonesian).
- Shadow Master - The main villain of the series. A dark creature with a hidden face somehow seeking to take over the world always with the help of his army of dark monsters. He was responsible for mastering the Lion Kingdom during the first season as well as defeating Max's father. Voiced by David J. Smith (English); Norman (Indonesian).
