= Leo Frigo Memorial Bridge =

Leo Frigo Bridge
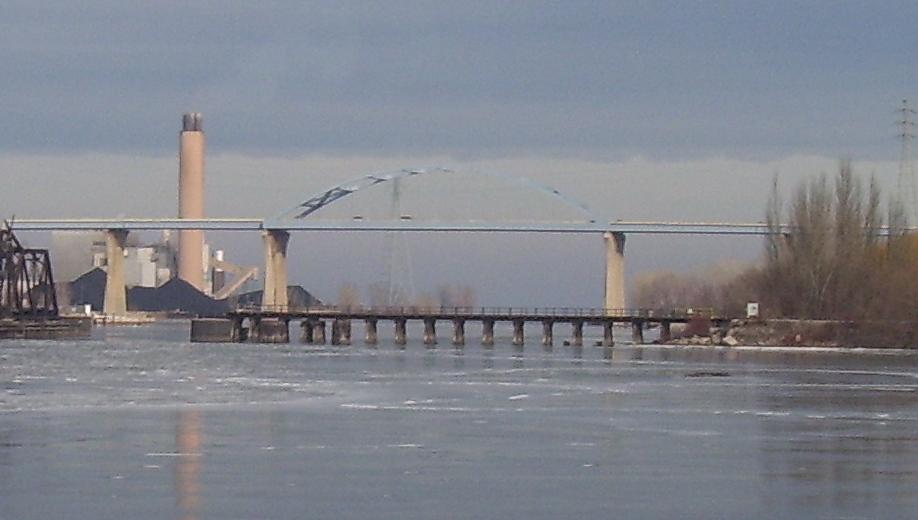
- The Leo Frigo Memorial Bridge
- Coordinates: 44°32′0.2″N 88°0′27.9″W
- Carries: 4 lanes of I-43
- Crosses: Fox River
- Locale: Green Bay, Wisconsin, U.S.
- Official name: Leo Frigo Memorial Bridge
- Maintained by: Wisconsin Department of Transportation (WisDOT)
- Next downstream: Ray Nitschke Memorial Bridge

Characteristics
- Design: Tied-arch bridge
- Total length: 1.51 mi (2,430.1 m)
- Width: 80.1 ft (24.4 m)
- Height: 203 ft (61.9 m)
- Longest span: 450.2 ft (137.2 m)
- Clearance below: 120 ft (36.6 m)

History
- Opened: 1981
- Closed: September 25, 2013 - January 5, 2014 (temporary)

Statistics
- Daily traffic: 34900 (in 2006)

The Leo Frigo Memorial Bridge is a bridge on the north side of Green Bay, Wisconsin. It carries Interstate 43 over the Fox River just south of its mouth into Green Bay. Formerly known as the Tower Drive Bridge, it was renamed in 2002 "in recognition and appreciation of Leo Frigo, a civic and philanthropic leader in the Green Bay area. The bridge opened to traffic in 1981. Because of the bridge's height and slope, it is prone to being shut down during inclement weather. The bridge carries roughly 40,000 vehicles per day as of 2015.

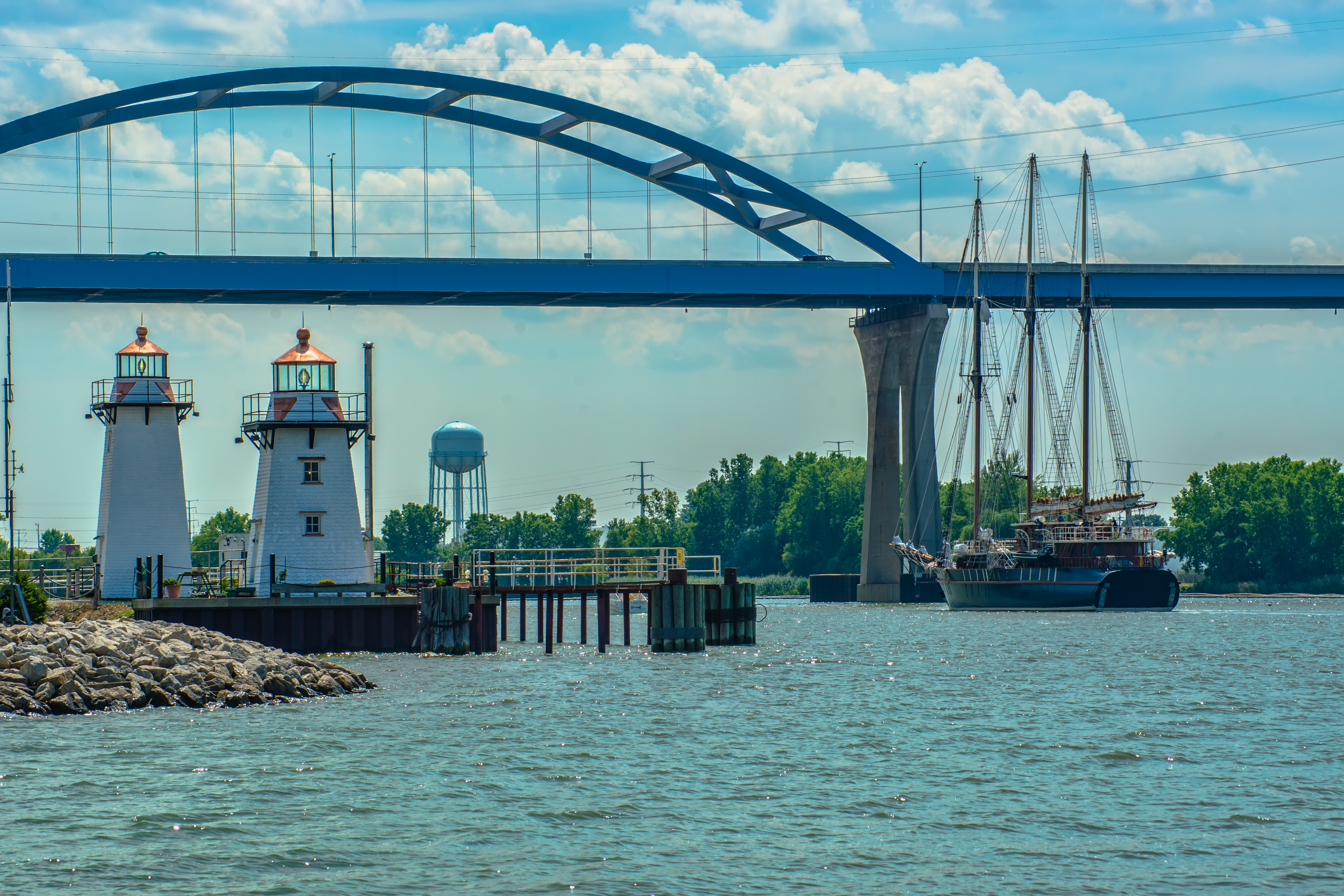
The Peacemaker sails past the Grassy Island Range Lights toward the Leo Frigo Memorial Bridge on its way into the port of Green Bay

== Suicides ==
As the highest bridge in the Green Bay area, it has been the scene of a number of suicide attempts. On July 19, 2004, a woman was saved by a Wisconsin state trooper, who caught her before she fell to her death. The woman and the state trooper were reunited on The Oprah Winfrey Show. She has since written a book, Why I Jumped, on her experiences. Signs have also been added to the bridge, containing the phone number for a local crisis hotline, with a suicide barrier under consideration as early as 2005, but not yet implemented going into the 2020s.

== Sagging ==
On September 24, 2013, the bridge was closed after a 400-foot (120 m) stretch of the bridge sagged. One pier's footings had settled two feet (0.61 m). The pilings, the pier, and surrounding piers had experienced significant corrosion because of the composition of the surrounding soil. The corrosion caused the pilings to buckle, leading to the sag. After the incident, the pier and the bridge were repaired and further fitted with sensors, which have not detected any further movement in the bridge. On January 5, 2014 the bridge was re-opened to traffic. The total cost of repairs was $8.45 million.
