= Grom (company) =

Italian ice cream company

Gromart S.r.l.
- Trade name: Grom
- Company type: Joint-stock
- Industry: Food and Beverage
- Genre: Ice cream
- Founded: May 18, 2003; 23 years ago in Turin, Italy
- Founder: Guido Martinetti, Federico Grom
- Headquarters: Piazza Paleocapa 1/D, Turin, Italy
- Number of locations: 64 (2015)
- Area served: China; France; Indonesia; Italy; Japan; United Kingdom
- Revenue: ▲€ 23 million
- Parent: The Magnum Ice Cream Company
- Website: https://www.gromgelato.com/

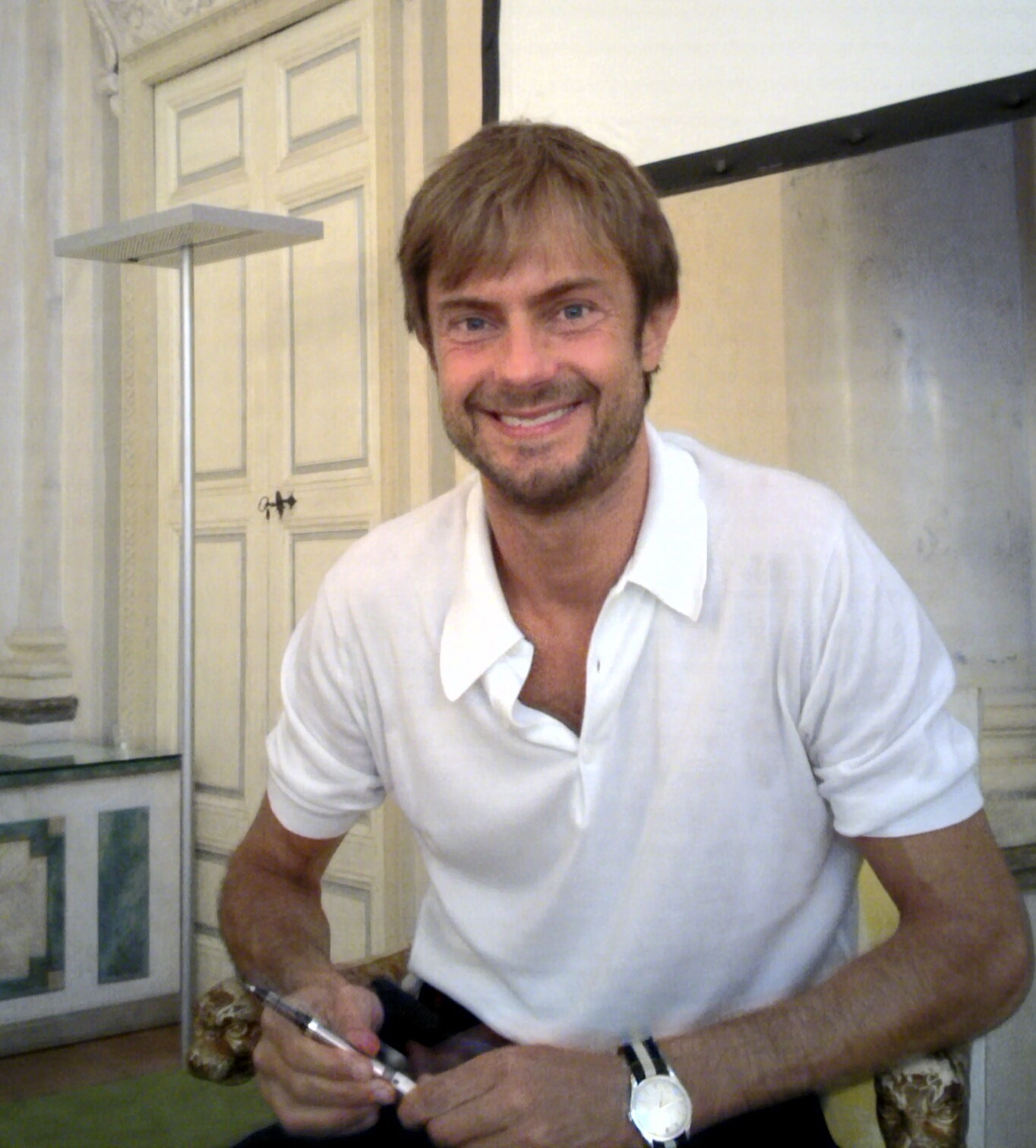
Guido Martinetti, co-founder of Grom

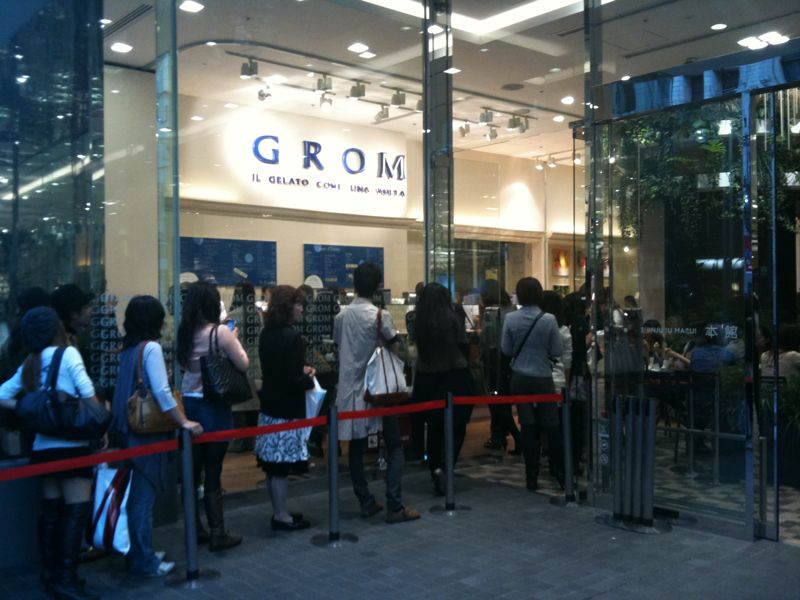
Grom shop in Shinjuku, Tokyo

Gromart S.p.A., traded as Grom, is an Italian gelato company based in Turin. Grom's first Italian store was established in 2003 by Federico Grom and Guido Martinetti. It had further expanded internationally and established branches in several regions, namely New York City, Los Angeles, Malibu, Paris, Jakarta, Osaka, Dubai and London.

== History ==
Founded from an initial investment of 32,500 euros per shareholder, in 2009 the company achieved a turnover of 16 million euros. In 2011, revenues reached 23 million.

On 1 October 2015, the consumer goods international Unilever acquired the company for an undisclosed price.

Grom has slowly closed a number of stores, including New York, Los Angeles, Century City, Modena and Hong Kong, while opening a new one in Prague. All US, Middle East and Hong Kong shops have been shut.
