= Plumgood Food =

2004–2008 American online grocery store

- Type: Private
- Industry: Retail
- Founded: 2004
- Founder: Kate and Eric Satz
- Defunct: 2008
- Headquarters: Nashville, Tennessee, U.S.
- Area served: Middle Tennessee and Kentucky
- Key people: Eric Satz (CEO)
- Website: http://www.plumgoodfood.com

Plumgood Food was an online grocery store based in Nashville, Tennessee. It was founded in 2004 by Kate and Eric Satz and served Middle Tennessee and Kentucky. The company went out of business in late 2008.

== See also ==
- Online shopping
