= Nutty Buddy (ice cream) =

US ice cream brand

Nutty Buddy is an ice cream cone topped with vanilla ice cream, chocolate ice cream, chocolate and peanuts, manufactured in the United States. Nutty Buddy was originally created and produced by Seymour Ice Cream Company, which was located in the Port Norfolk section of Dorchester, Massachusetts, and named after its owner, Buddy Seymourian. Seymour Ice Cream ceased operations in the 1980s.

Subsequently the Nutty Buddy name was owned by the Sweetheart Cup Company, the manufacturer of machines that produced the cones. Sweetheart went out of business in 1998. The cones continued to be sold for a time by Purity Dairies in Nashville, Tennessee. As of 2023 a Nutty Buddy cone is sold by Mayfield Dairy Farms in El Paso, Texas.
