= Viennetta =

Brand of ice cream dessert

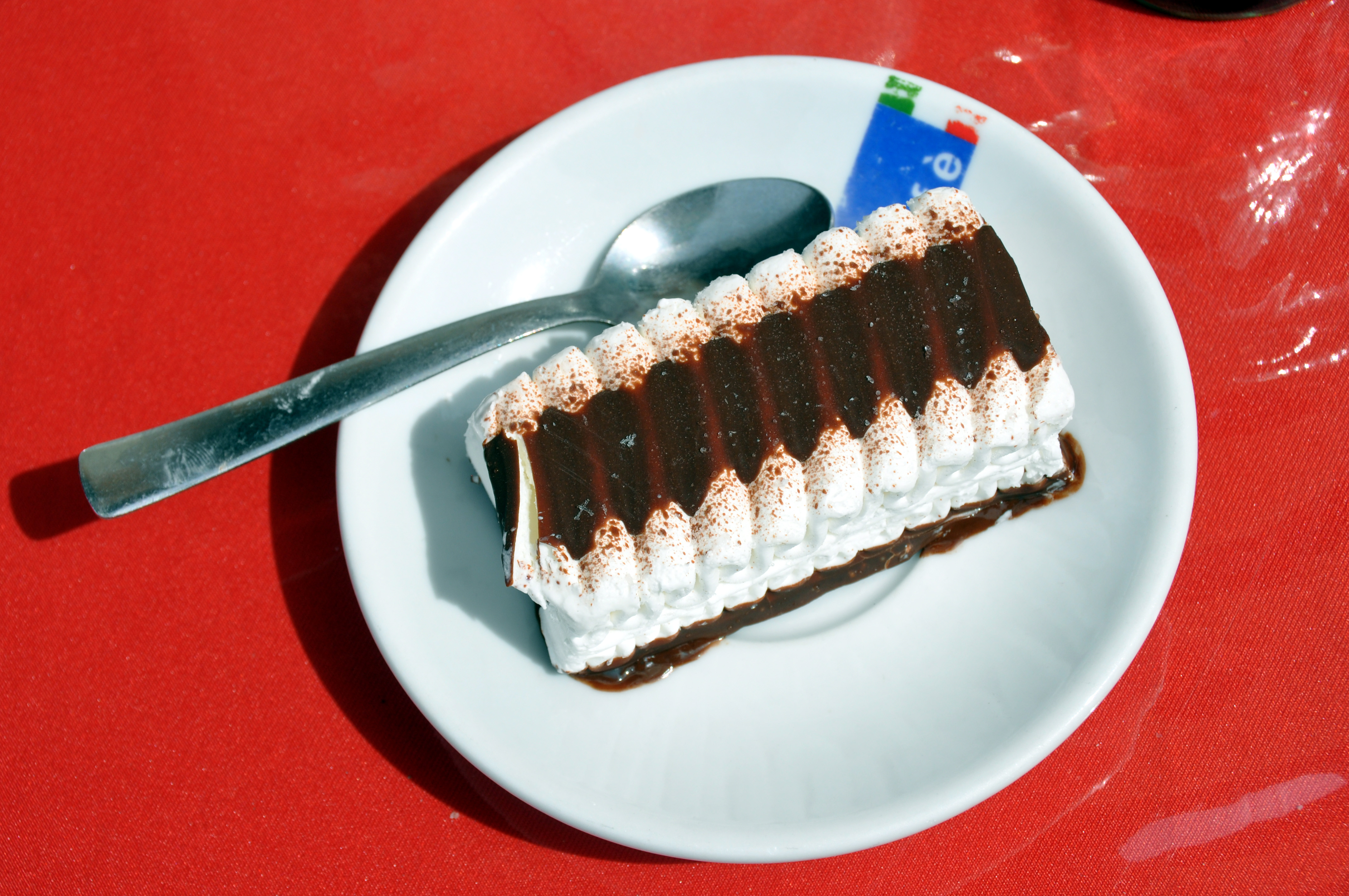
A Viennetta dessert

Viennetta is a British brand of ice cream dessert made by The Magnum Ice Cream Company and sold under the various Heartbrand brands around the world. The original Viennetta consists of several rippled layers of ice cream separated by thin layers of sprayed-on compound chocolate. It is available in many flavours, including vanilla and mint.

== History ==
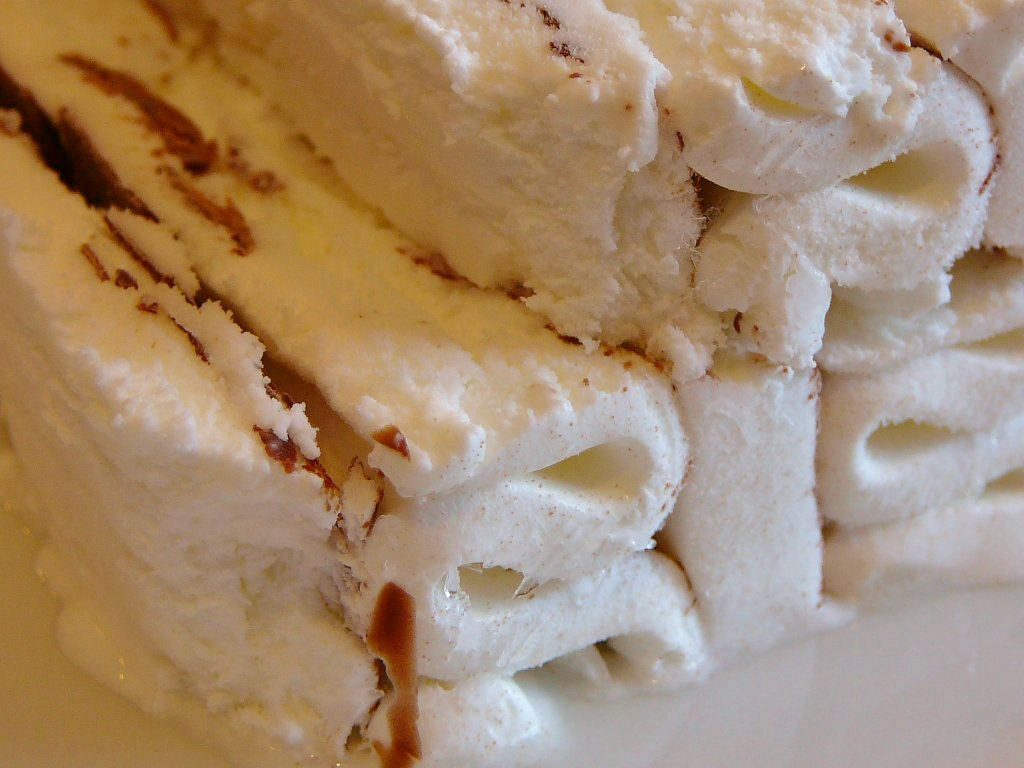
Close-up of a slice of Viennetta, showing the trademark 'concertina' effect created during production

Viennetta was launched by British ice cream company Wall's in 1982. The layered product and patented technique for its production were devised by Kevin Hillman, development manager at Wall's Gloucester factory; Ian Butcher; and Gordon Stewart Carrick. The layers of ice cream were extruded, one after another, onto trays sitting on a moving belt. The rate of extrusion was greater than the speed of the belt, which causes festooning or bunching of the ice cream; each layer was extruded at a different speed from the previous layer. The final effect was akin to a series of waves rippling through the product, giving a concertina effect to the resultant confection.

A long-running UK advertising campaign for the product used the slogan "one slice is never enough", which is still occasionally used in promotion efforts.

In 2007, to celebrate the brand's 25th birthday, a 22.7 metres (74 ft) long Viennetta was made, setting the world record for longest ice cream.

== Worldwide distribution ==
Launched originally as a multi-portion dessert product, its success after being launched throughout KFC and Pizza Hut restaurants led to Unilever, owners of Wall's, producing many flavour and size variants. Viennetta was introduced in the United States and Canada in the late 1980s under the Breyer's brand, and was discontinued in the mid-1990s, but was re-introduced in the US in 2021 under the Good Humor brand.

Unilever no longer produces the brand in Canada. It is sold in Australia and New Zealand under the Streets brand. It is sold in Italy in all supermarkets by Algida, and in Israel by Strauss, under the name Fantasia (פנטסיה) as well as Germany, Greece and Austria. It is sold in Japan by Morinaga Milk Industry. In Finland, Viennetta is sold under the Ingman brand. Viennetta is also sold in China with the name Qiancengxue (千层雪 "Thousand-layered snow").

Viennetta was also sold in Indonesia from mid-1990s until the mid-2000s, and re-introduced in April 2020, after a petition signed by almost 75,000 people demanded its comeback to the Indonesian market. In Thailand, it was originally available in the 1990s, and reintroduced again in November 2020. Viennetta was previously known as Comtessa in Spain but, due to a legal problem, became Viennetta in the 1990s.

Viennetta was sold in Mexico until the early 2000s, and was reintroduced by Holanda in 2018 following a petition on change.org several years prior.

Viennetta has been sold in Japan since September 1983 under the Morinaga brand. In 2025, Morinaga announced that it will stop selling Viennetta on 31 March 2025 due to the termination of license.
