= Federigo =

Federigo is a given name. Notable people with the name include:

- Federigo Argentieri (born 1953), Italian scholar and academic
- Federigo Enriques (1871–1946), Italian mathematician
- Federigo Fregoso (1480–1541), Italian nobleman, prelate and general
- Federigo Giambelli, Italian military engineer in the 16th century
- Federigo Tozzi (1883–1920), Italian writer
