= Frigo (ice cream) =

Spanish ice cream company

- Product type: Ice cream; Frozen dessert
- Current owner: The Magnum Ice Cream Company
- Country: Spain
- Introduced: 1927; 99 years ago
- Previous owners: Unilever (since 2025)
- Website: www.frigo.es

Frigo is a Spanish company dedicated to manufacturing and marketing ice cream, which has been part of the multinational Unilever since 1973 through 2025, now owned by The Magnum Ice Cream Company.

== History ==
The company was founded by the Rimblas brothers in 1927 in Barcelona, under the name of Industrias Frigoríficas de Alimentación, S.A. This company was the first Spanish company to produce ice cream industrially, and later expanded throughout the national territory as Productos Frigo. In the beginning, in addition to ice cream, it was dedicated to producing yogurt and pre-cooked foods.

In 1973, the Anglo-Dutch multinational Unilever became the largest shareholder of Frigo, at that time with a staff of 700 employees and a capital of 262 million pesetas (equivalent to €29M in 2022).

As part of Unilever, Frigo specialized exclusively in ice cream; In addition to distributing the group's brands, it began to develop its own references such as Drácula (1977), Frigodedo (1980), Frigo Pie (1983), Calippo (1984), Twister (1986) and the Frac (1989). Many of those brands are still available.

Starting in 1998, Frigo assimilated the unified Heartbrand corporate image, with a heart as its logo.

Unilever announced in 2008 that it would close the Frigo factory in Barcelona and make 268 employees redundant. It was eventually sold to the Catalan company Farga, producer of Farggi ice cream.
