= Leo Frigo =

- Born: July 3, 1931
- Died: February 13, 2001 (aged 69); Iron Mountain, Michigan
- Children: Mary Beth Frigo, Barbara Frigo (deceased), Yvonne Jahnke, Margaret Longstreet, Christopher Frigo

Leo Gaetano Giacomo Frigo (July 3, 1931 – February 13, 2001) was a civic and philanthropic leader in the Green Bay, Wisconsin, area.

== Life ==
Frigo was born on July 3, 1931, to Pasquale Frigo and Camilla née Rocheleau Frigo in Pound, Wisconsin. His father established the Frigo Brothers cheese company of Iron Mountain together with his four brothers in 1939. Leo Frigo eventually became director of the company's Lena plant, the Frigo Cheese Corporation, and then its president. He retired from the company in 1983. He died on February 13, 2001, due to injuries from a car accident while delivering food to the needy.

== Legacy ==
Frigo's legacy includes Paul's Pantry. After his death the Leo Frigo Memorial Bridge, a major bridge in Green Bay, was renamed in his honor.
