= Weis (ice cream) =

Australian frozen dessert brand

- Product type: Ice cream
- Current owner: The Magnum Ice Cream Company
- Country: Australia
- Introduced: 1957
- Previous owners: Unilever (until 2025)
- Website: https://www.weis.com.au/

Weis is an Australian brand owned by The Magnum Ice Cream Company that produces frozen ice confectionery and frozen fruit desserts. They are most well known for their bar shaped fruit ice creams known as Weis Bars. They are sold at most Australian milk bars and supermarkets and in boxes of eight mini bars or four regular-sized bars at most supermarkets. The Weis manufacturing plant was formerly located in Toowoomba, Queensland, but has been closed and sold off. Production now takes place in Minto, New South Wales.

== History ==
The original Weis Fruito Bar was developed by Les Weis in 1957 and was sold from his own corner store in Toowoomba. The Weis Fruito Bar contains pineapple, banana and passion fruit. The most popular bar is the Mango and Cream which launched in 1959.

Weis was announced as one of the 150 cultural icons announced in Queensland's Q150 celebrations.

In January 2016, Weis planned a successful push into the Chinese market. The Toowoomba company has exported Weis bars to Japan for more than 20 years and close to 30 per cent of its business is now outside Australia.

Until August 2017, Weis was a privately owned Australian company. The company was owned and operated by a second generation of the Weis family until they sold it to the Anglo-Dutch firm, Unilever.

In late 2019, Unilever announced plans to close the original Weis plant in Toowoomba, making redundant all 93 workers, and move all manufacturing to its Minto Plant in western Sydney. This change was despite the foreign conglomerate telling the original owners that manufacturing would stay in Toowoomba.

== Awards ==
In 2009 as part of the Q150 celebrations, the Weis Bar was announced as one of the Q150 Icons of Queensland for its role as an iconic "innovation and invention".
