= The Magnum Ice Cream Company =

Dutch multinational ice cream company

The Magnum Ice Cream Company N.V.
- Type: Public
- Traded as: Euronext Amsterdam: MICC; LSE: MICC; NYSE: MICC
- ISIN: NL0015002MS2
- Industry: Food
- Predecessor: Unilever's ice cream division
- Founded: 1 July 2025; 16 months ago
- Headquarters: Amsterdam, Netherlands
- Area served: Worldwide
- Key people: Jean-François van Boxmeer (chair); Peter ter Kulve (CEO)
- Products: Ice cream; Frozen dessert
- Brands: List of brands
- Revenue: ▼€7,910 million (2025)
- Operating income: ▼€599 million (2025)
- Net income: ▼€307 million (2025)
- Website: corporate.magnumicecream.com

The Magnum Ice Cream Company N.V. is a Dutch multinational ice cream company headquartered in Amsterdam, Netherlands. Incorporating several major ice cream brands and having about 21% of global market share, the Magnum Ice Cream Company is the world's largest ice cream manufacturer.

The Magnum Ice Cream Company formed on 1 July 2025 as an independent subsidiary of Unilever, encompassing Unilever's ice cream division. In December 2025, the subsidiary was separated and admitted to the regulated markets of publicly listed shares on Euronext Amsterdam, London Stock Exchange, and New York Stock Exchange.

== History ==
Plain logo of Unilever's ice cream brands prior to 1998.

Old plain "Heartbrand" logo used from 1998 to 2003 (and still by some brands).

=== Early history ===
Prior to the heart logo, the ice cream brands had different logos, often consisting of a blue circle with the local brand's name over a background of five vertical red stripes. Uses of this logo reach back to the 1960s. Though it was not universally used for all the countries listed above (Wall's in the UK, for example, used a yellow logo with Wall's in blue text), while many brands were shared across different countries.

The Heartbrand was launched in 1998 as an effort to increase international brand awareness and promote cross-border synergies in manufacturing and marketing ("centralisation"). It featured a red curved heart on a yellow background and was designed by Carter Wong Design. The updated brand was promoted with a Europe-wide marketing campaign and a cooperation with the US cable television channel MTV.

In early 2003 the symbol itself was simplified by replacing the yellow shades with white. The blue script lettering for the local names was abandoned in favour of a simpler all-caps sans-serif font.

Around 2006, Unilever was the world's biggest ice cream manufacturer, with an annual turnover of €5 billion and invested around €50 million annually in ice-cream research and development.

=== Formation of The Magnum Ice Cream Company ===
In March 2024, Unilever announced plans to spin off its ice cream unit into a standalone business planned to complete by the end of 2025. On 1 July 2025, in preparation to becoming a stand-alone company, Unilever's ice cream division became an independent subsidiary named the Magnum Ice Cream Company, with headquarters in Amsterdam, Netherlands.

Unilever deemed the demerger of ice cream division necessary as ice cream has distinct characteristics compared with Unilever's other operating businesses, including frozen supply chain and point of sale that support frozen goods, a different channel landscape, more seasonality, and greater capital intensity and allows Unilever to more closely align with its core businesses in four categories; personal care, home care, beauty & wellbeing and foods.

The Magnum Ice Cream Company is predicted to have about 21% of the world's ice cream sales.

=== Dispute with Ben and Jerry's ===
In September 2025, after the Magnum Ice Cream Company had demerged from Unilever, Ben & Jerry's cofounder, Ben Cohen, protested in London, demanding to "free Ben & Jerry's", which he and his fellow cofounder, Jerry Greenfield, said was necessary to protect the long-held social values of Ben & Jerry's. The new CEO of Magnum, Peter ter Kulve, however, stated that Ben & Jerry's would not be sold because it was fully integrated into the Magnum Ice Cream Company. Later in September, Greenfield resigned from the company in protest that Unilever and the Magnum Ice Cream Company were inhibiting the independence of Ben & Jerry's to have a voice on social issues.

=== Listings ===
On 8 December 2025, the Magnum Ice Cream Company was spun-off and listed for trading with an initial public offering on the Amsterdam, London, and New York stock exchanges and an initial market value of $9.1 billion.

== Brands ==
=== Heartbrand ===
The Heartbrand logo from 2003. The regional brands are usually named below this logo in red text.

The Heartbrand was designed by London-based Carter Wong & Partners and revealed in 1998 by Unilever for many of its ice cream brands across the world. When it was announced it would affect Wall's in the United Kingdom, Unilever described the new logo, that initially featured a pair of red and yellow intertwining hearts, to be more representative of "feelings of happiness associated with sharing Wall's ice cream with family and friends" throughout the year. The rebranding in the UK involved 100,000 ice cream outlets. Unilever originally called it the Heart. They re-launched the logo in 2003.

By 2019, brands using the logo were sold by Unilever in over 40 countries. Most of Unilever's brands had used it, including Wall's (United Kingdom), Algida (Italy), Langnese (Germany), Kibon (Brazil) and Ola (Netherlands). While Popsicle, Klondike bar, Breyers and Ben & Jerry's had not used the Heartbrand under Unilever.

The company was formed out of Unilever's ice cream division, which included the following:

=== Global ===
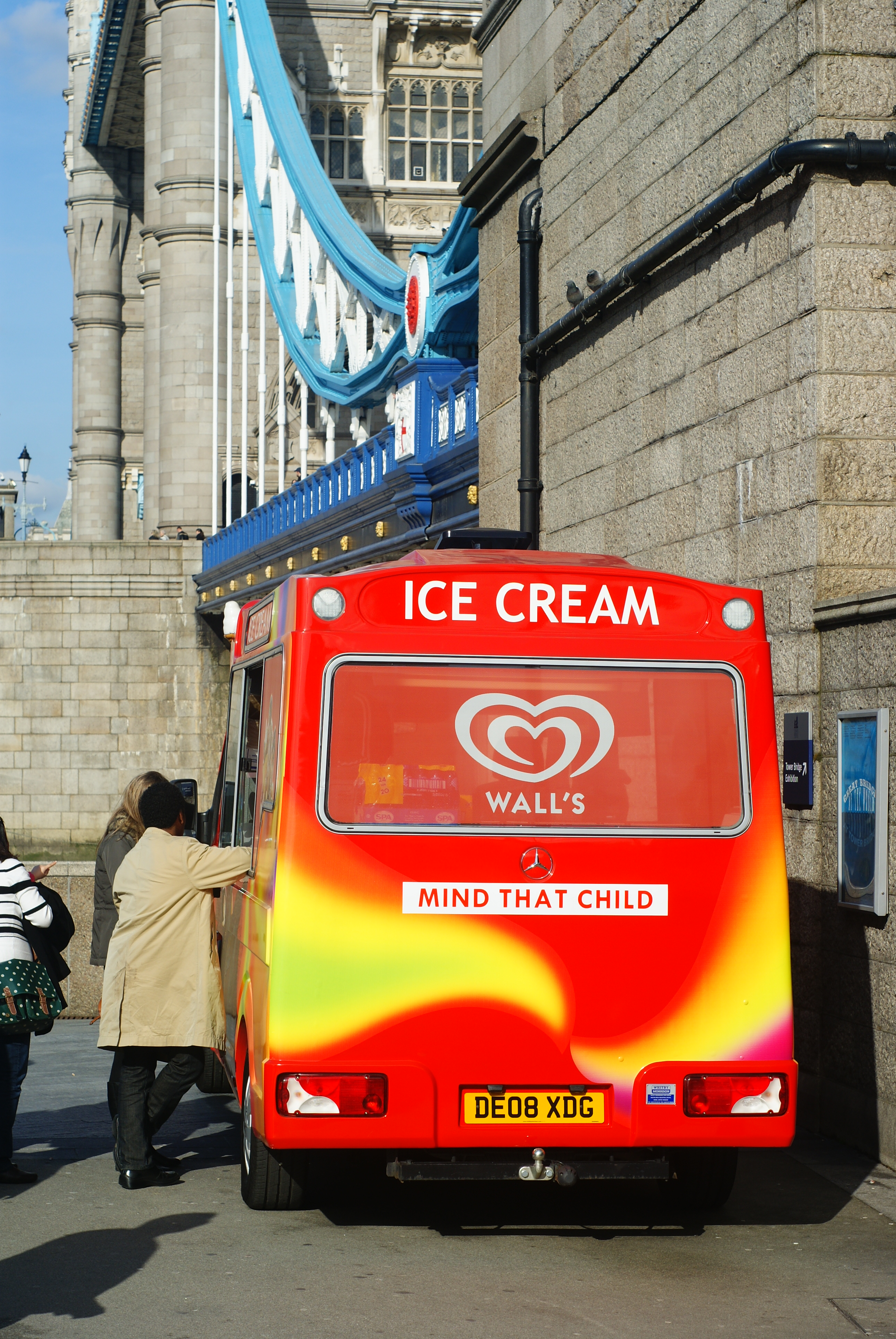
Wall's ice cream Heartbrand logo on the back of a sales truck, London, 2010

- Ben & Jerry's – ice cream
- Breyers – ice cream and frozen dairy desserts
- Calippo – juicy ice lollies
- Choc Ice – Chocolate covered ice cream
- Cornetto – ice cream cone
- Dracula
- Feast – Chocolate covered ice cream with chocolate inner stick
- Fudgsicle – ice pops
- Grom – gelato
- Klondike – ice cream bars
- Magnum – Chocolate covered ice cream
- Nogger – ice cream
- Popsicle – frozen treats
- Solero – ice cream with fruit covering
- Talenti – gelato
- Twister
- Viennetta
- Weis – frozen fruit desserts, ice cream (Australia)
- Yasso – frozen Greek yoghurt

=== Regional ===
The majority of the company's ice-creams are sold under the Heartbrand brand, with each region using a different name:

- Algida – ice cream (Slovakia, Czech Republic, Hungary, Italy, Poland, Turkey and the Balkans)
- Darko (Дарко) – ice cream (Bulgaria)
- Eskimo – ice cream (Austria)
- Frigo – ice cream (Spain, Andorra)
- Frisko – ice cream (Denmark)
- GB Glace – ice cream (Sweden)
- Good Humor – ice cream (United States)
- HB – ice cream (Ireland)
- Heluxue 和露雪 – ice cream (China)
- Holanda – ice cream (Mexico, Central America and Dominican Republic)
- Ingman – ice cream (Finland)
- Kibon – ice cream (Brazil)
- Kwality Wall's – ice cream (India)
- Langnese – ice cream (Germany)
- Lusso – ice cream (Switzerland)
- Miko – ice cream (France, Egypt, Morocco, Mauritius, Senegal and Djibouti)
- Oando – ice cream (Turkey)
- Olá – ice cream (Portugal)
- Ola – ice cream (Netherlands, Belgium)
- Ola South Africa – ice cream (South Africa)
- Pingüino – ice cream (Ecuador)
- Selecta – ice cream (Philippines)
- Seru – low-cost ice cream (Indonesia)
- Strauss (שטראוס) – ice cream (Israel)
- Streets – ice cream (Australia and New Zealand)
- Wall's – ice cream (United Kingdom)

=== Former Unilever-owned brands ===
- Helados La Fuente – ice cream (Colombia; until 2001, when Unilever's ice cream business was sold to Meals de Colombia, the owner of Crem Helado)
- Bresler – ice cream (Chile; until 2020, when Unilever's ice cream business in Chile was sold to Carozzi; the transfer also included the Melevi brand. A license agreement allows Carozzi to use the Magnum Ice Cream Company's brands in Chile)
- Inmarko (Инмарко) – ice cream (Russia; until 2024, when Unilever's entire Russian business was transferred to the multinational company Arnest Group, which operates in Russia)
- Tío Rico – helados (Venezuela; until 2025, when Unilever's ice cream business in Venezuela was sold to Mack de Venezuela)
