= Mark Frigo =

American economist

Mark L. Frigo is an American economist, currently the Ledger & Quill Alumni Foundation Distinguished Professor at Kellstadt Graduate School of Business, DePaul University.
