= Arnest Group =

Russian consumer goods company

- Type: Public joint stock company
- Industry: Consumer goods
- Founded: 1971
- Headquarters: Nevinnomyssk, Russia
- Key people: Sagal Alexey Eduardovich, president
- Number of employees: 2,000 (2023)
- Website: http://www.arnest.ru

The Arnest Group is a Russian manufacturer of perfumery, cosmetics and household products. It has become notable for acquiring the local assets of several Western companies who had previously operated in Russia until 2022, when international sanctions were imposed following the Russian invasion of Ukraine.

== History ==
The company was founded in 1971 in Nevinnomyssk and expanded in 2007, following the purchase of Aerosol Novomoskovsk.

Following the Russian invasion of Ukraine, in February 2022, many Western companies curtailed their operations in Russia and, aided by favourable conditions imposed by the Russian government, the Arnest Group entered a period of rapid expansion by buying up Western subsidiaries.

In September 2022, it purchased the Russian wing of the American aluminium manufacturing company, the Ball Corporation, in a deal worth $530 million. In August 2023, it purchased the Russian subsidiary of the Dutch brewing company, Heineken. The deal, worth $108 million, incorporated all of Heineken's Russian assets, including seven breweries, but did not include any Heineken branding rights. And in October 2024, it purchased the Russian wing of the British consumer goods company, Unilever. The deal, worth $562 million, included all of Unilever's business in Russia, four factories, and businesses in Belarus. And in February 2026, it purchased the Russian business of the Anglo-American direct selling company Avon Products worth $31 million.
