= HB Ice Cream =

Irish ice-cream brand

HB Ice Cream (originally an initialisation of both Hughes Brothers and Hazelbrook Farm) is an ice cream brand in Ireland and is part of The Magnum Ice Cream Company.

It manufactures most of the Heartbrand's ice cream range, as well as some products designed exclusively for the Irish market, including the Hazelbrook Farm range of blocks of ice-cream. Vanilla comes in Blue, Mint Choc in Mint Green, Honeycomb in Honey colour, Banana in Yellow-Brown colour, Strawberry and Rasberry Ripple in Pink, Caramel in Caramel colour and various.

In Northern Ireland, both HB and Wall's ice-cream (the UK variant of the Heartbrand) are available, and in recent years have been promoted together as HB Wall's.

== History ==
The company was founded in 1926 as Hughes Brothers by James, George, and William Hughes at Hazelbrook Farm in Churchtown, Dublin. The name Hazelbrook Farm was dropped during World War II but brought back in the late 1980s except that it was called "HB Originals" from 2002 to 2005. In 1964, the milk distribution operations of HB were transferred to Premier Dairies. The rest of the company was sold to W. R. Grace and Company and subsequently became part of Unilever in 1973. HB also made sweets and chocolate too at phases. In 2002 and 2003, the company also made frozen yogurt.

In 2003, the HB Ice Cream plant in Churchtown was closed with the loss of 180 jobs.

Hazelbrook House, the Hughes family farmhouse, was moved to Bunratty Folk Park in 2001, where it is now on display and open to the public.

== See also ==
- Choc Ice
- Golly Bar
- Heartbrand
- List of ice cream brands
- Unilever
- Wibbly Wobbly Wonder
