= Talenti =

American brand of gelato and sorbet

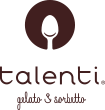
- Type: Subsidiary
- Industry: Food processing
- Founded: 2003; 23 years ago Dallas, Texas, U.S.
- Founder: Josh Hochschuler
- Key people: Steve Gill, CEO
- Parent: The Magnum Ice Cream Company
- Website: www.talentigelato.com

Talenti is an American brand of gelato and sorbet produced by Unilever. Talenti is named after Bernardo Buontalenti, who is credited with inventing gelato.

Talenti began in 2003 as a store-front gelateria in Dallas, Texas. Founder Josh Hochschuler based his recipe on a traditional Argentine gelato-making method. The gelateria was closed by 2005, and Hochschuler refocused the business as a maker of gelato for sale to restaurants, hotels and eventually grocery stores.

International foods conglomerate Unilever purchased the brand in 2014. In 2017, production was moved from Marietta, Georgia, to Unilever's central ice cream producing facility in Sikeston, Missouri. In December 2025, Unilever divested its ice cream brands into The Magnum Ice Cream Company.
