= Wall's (ice cream) =

Brand of ice cream and frozen dessert products

- Product type: Ice cream; Frozen dessert
- Current owner: The Magnum Ice Cream Company
- Country: United Kingdom
- Introduced: 1922; 104 years ago
- Related brands: Wall's (meat)
- Previous owners: Unilever (until 2025)
- Tagline: "Goodbye Serious"; Semua Jadi Happy ("Everyone's Happy", Indonesia only)
- Website: www.wallsicecream.com/uk/home.html

Wall's is an ice cream and frozen dessert brand in the United Kingdom owned by The Magnum Ice Cream Company and is part of the Heartbrand global frozen dessert brand. The company was established in 1922 when ice cream production commenced at a factory in Acton, Middlesex.

Wall's remains the market leader in the UK for individual hand-held ice cream products such as Cornetto and Magnum. The brand also owns the rights to the Mr. Whippy soft-serve ice cream mix.

== History ==
Wall's was founded in 1786 by Richard Wall, when he opened a butcher's stall in St James's Market, London. In the 1900s the business was led by Richard's grandson Thomas Wall II. Every year the company had to lay off staff in the summer as demand for its sausages, pies and meat fell, so in 1913 Thomas Wall II conceived the idea of making ice cream in the summer to avoid those lay-offs; the First World War meant that his idea was not implemented until 1922. Following his retirement in 1920, Thomas Wall II created his Trust for the "encouragement and assistance of educational work and social service". Today, the Trust continues to assist in these areas by providing grants to individuals and organisations.

By 1922, the business had been jointly bought by Lever Brothers and Margarine Unie. Maxwell Holt was put in charge and he revived the idea of producing ice cream, with near instant success. Ice cream production commenced in 1922 at a factory in Acton, London. In 1959, Wall's doubled capacity by opening a purpose-built ice cream factory in Gloucester, England.

There is a garage on the corner of Aultone Way and Angel Hill in Benhilton, Sutton, London, built in about 1913 and still in use today, which was originally used for the storing of the 'Stop Me and Buy One' bicycles of Thomas Wall's business.

The actor Sir Roger Moore, best known for portraying James Bond, famously claimed to have come up with the idea of the Magnum in the 1960s, with the BBC stating back then he wished for "Wall's to produce a choc ice on a stick", although Wall's deny any knowledge of this, saying it is no more than "a brilliant story".

On 19 March 2024, Unilever announced it would divest its ice cream brands and cut 7,500 jobs in order to make "a simpler, more focused and higher performing Unilever." The divestment was expected to be completed by the end of 2025.

== Ice cream ==
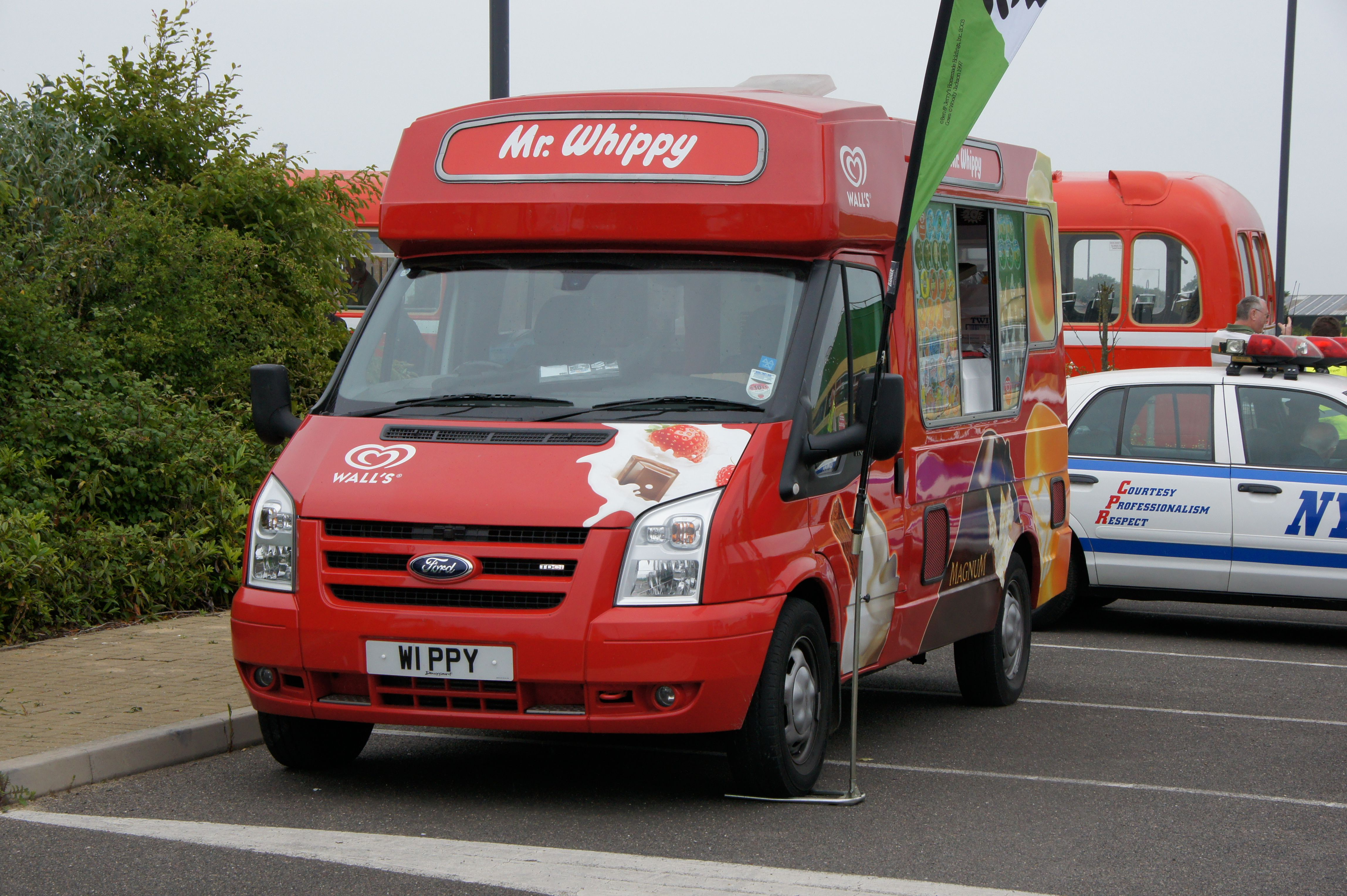
A Wall's ice cream van parked in Clacton, Essex, England

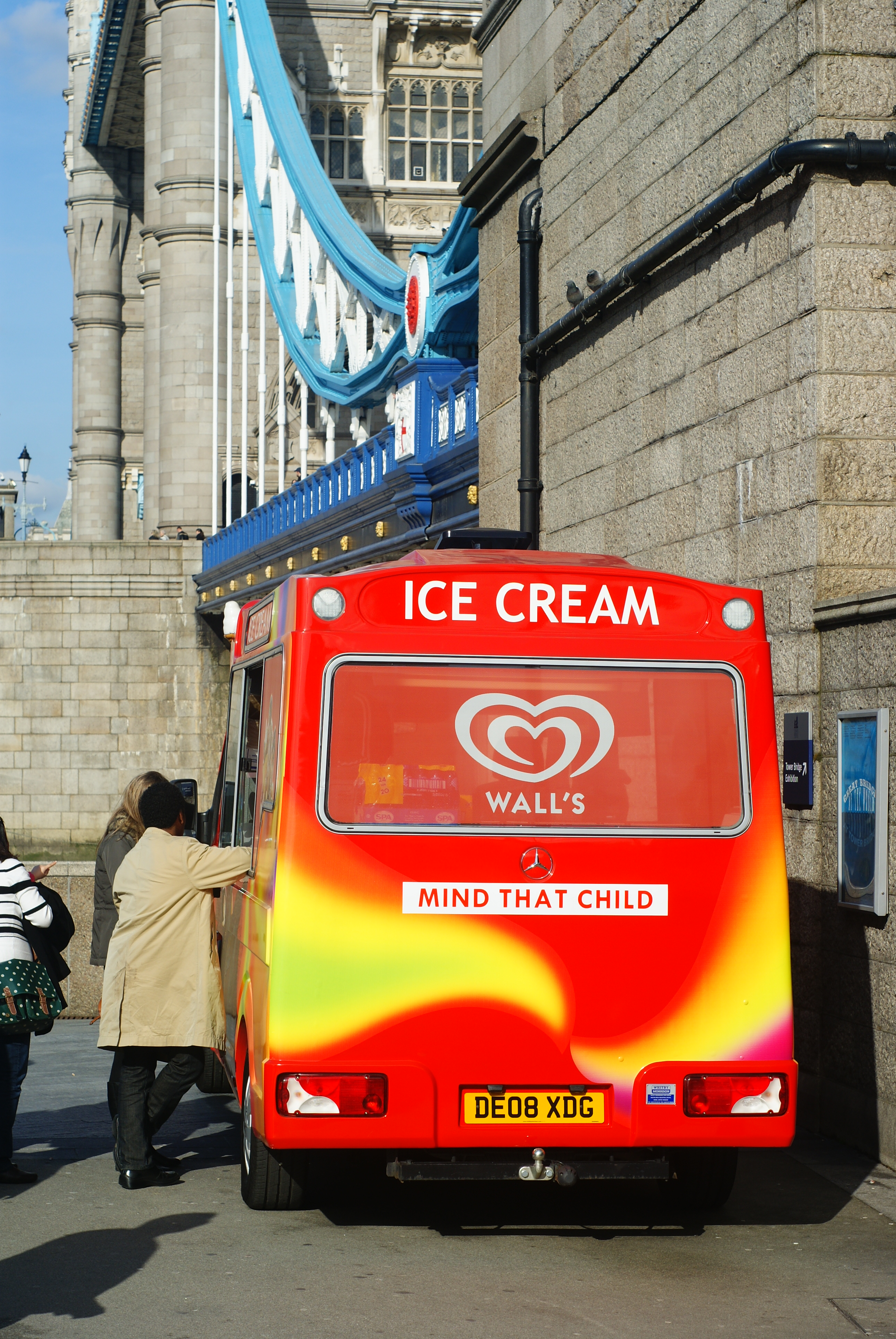
Rear of a Wall's ice cream van (with Wall's logo visible) next to Tower Bridge in London

Unilever continues to use the brand for ice cream in the UK and it has become part of the company's international Heartbrand strategy, where it retains its local ice cream brand but shares one logo and most of the product's lineup with the various other Heartbrand brands across the world. Whilst remaining (2006) the market leader in the UK for individual hand-held products such as Cornetto and Magnum, and value-added multi-portion products designed to be eaten at home, such as Viennetta, the Wall's brand faces severe competition from the major supermarket brands and to a lesser extent from Nestlé (absorbing the Rowntree's and Lyons Maid brands) and Mars spin-off ice cream products.

Wall's holds a prominent position in the global ice cream market, with two of its brands ranked among the top ten worldwide. Operating under the Heartbrand logo, they produce 40 distinct brands across 52 countries.

In 2013, Wall's expanded into the UK confectionery market following a licensing deal with Kinnerton Confectionery, leading to the introduction of ambient chocolate bar variations for the Magnum, Cornetto and Mini Milk ice cream brands. In 2017, Wall's created Magnum Ice Cream Tubs which are sold in shops.

The brand launched in Canada in 2022 with a range of Asian-inspired flavours including bubble tea and ube. These flavours are not actually available under the Wall's brand in the UK but are intended to leverage global recognition of the Heartbrand logo; Unilever uses the Breyers brand for its main range of ice cream products in Canada.
