= List of ice cream brands =

This is a list of notable ice cream brands. Ice cream is a frozen dessert, usually made from dairy products such as milk and cream, and often combined with fruits or other ingredients and flavors, but not all frozen desserts can be called ice cream.

== Ice cream brands ==
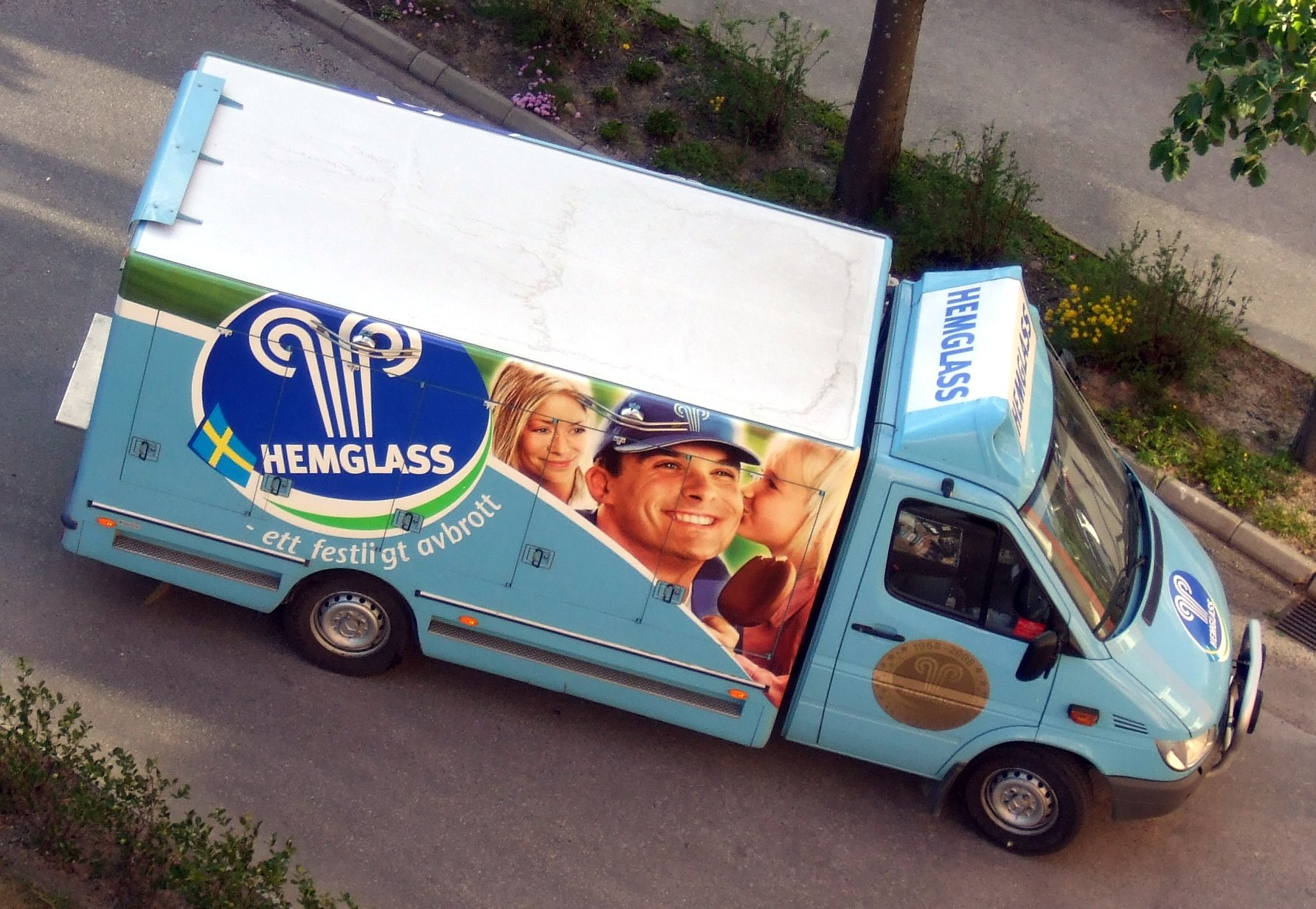
Hjem-IS ice cream truck in Sweden, 2008

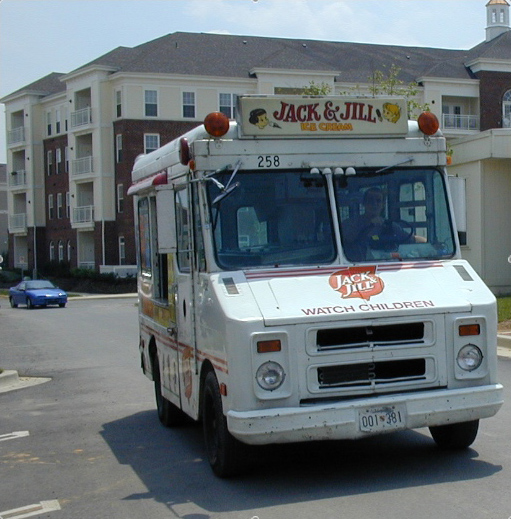
Jack and Jill Ice Cream truck, Kentlands, Maryland, 2005

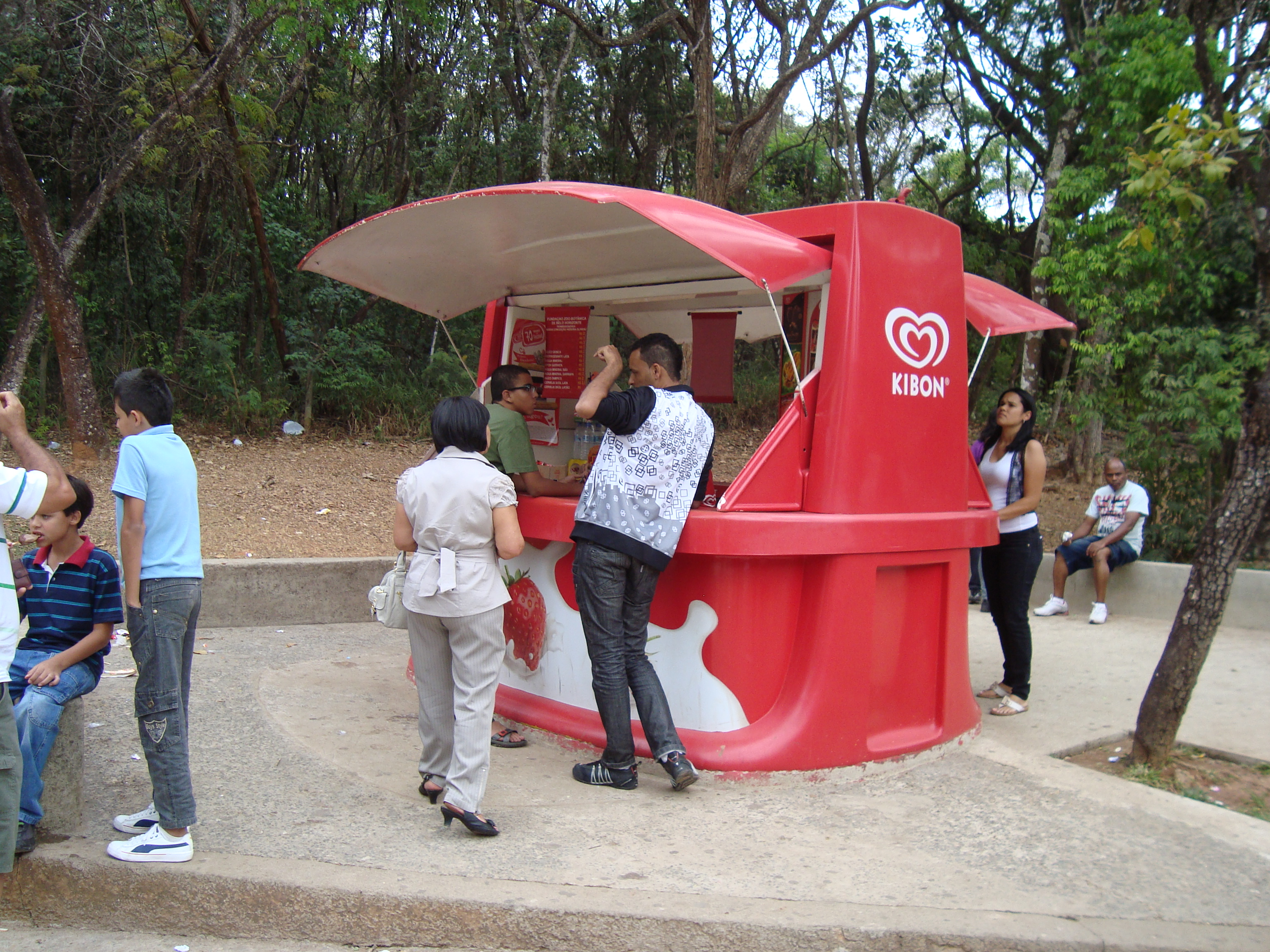
Kibon ice cream stand in Brazil, 2011

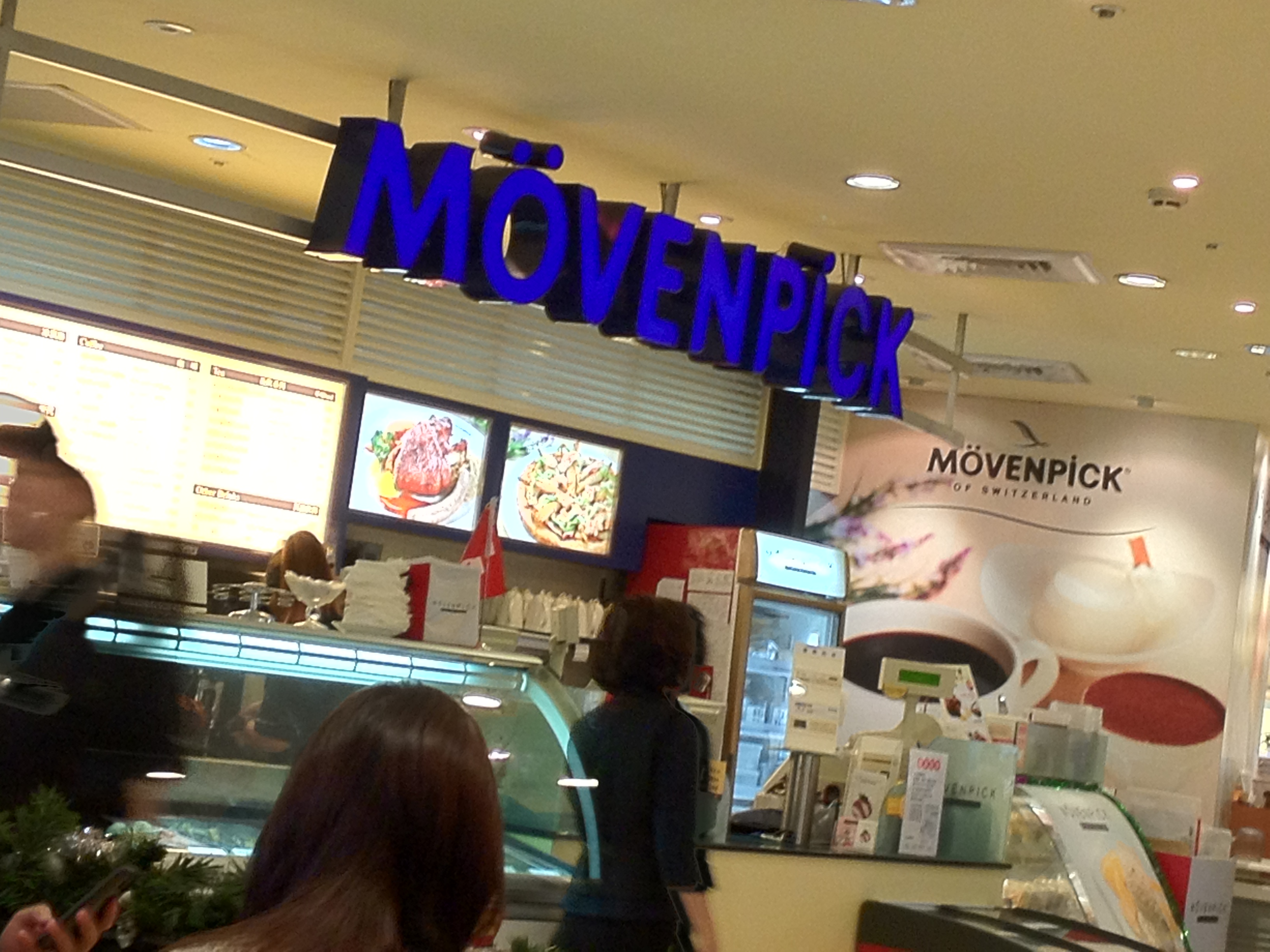
Mövenpick retail store, Taiwan, 2011

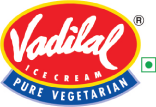
Vadilal logo, 2011

=== 0-9 ===
- 3 kaveria (Finland)

=== A ===
- Aavin (India)
- Abbott's Frozen Custard (US)
- Algida (Italy)
- Ample Hills (US)
- Amul (India)
- Anita Gelato (Israel)
- Arun Icecreams (India)
- Australian Homemade (Netherlands)

=== B ===
- Bambino Ice Cream (Poland)
- Bassetts Ice (US)
- Bico (Barbados)
- Bell (US)
- Blue Bunny (US)
- Bon Ice Cream (United States, Dominican Republic and the Caribbean)
- Bonnie Doon Ice Cream (US, defunct)
- Braum's (US)
- Bresler's Ice Cream (US, defunct)
- Breyers (US)
- Brigham's Ice Cream (US)
- Bubbies (US)
- Bulla (Australia)

=== C ===
- Cauldron Ice Cream (US)
- Cargills Magic (Sri Lanka)
- Carvel (US)
- Chapman's (Canada)
- Chicecream (China)
- Chilly Moo's Ice Cream Treatery (Barbados)
- Choctál (US)
- Cold Stone Creamery (US)
- Cold Rock Ice Creamery (Australia)
- Colonial Ice Cream (US)
- Coolhaus (US)
- Cows Creamery (Canada)
- Creamery Novelties Ice Cream (Caribbean)
- Cream Stone (India)
- Crem Helado (Colombia)

=== D ===
- Dairy Queen (US)
- Dewar's (US)
- Dickie Dee (Canada, defunct)
- Diplom-Is (Norway)
- Dippin' Dots (US)
- D'Onofrio (Peru)
- Double Rainbow (US)
- Dreyer's (US)
- Dale Farm (Ireland)

=== E ===
- Edy's (US)
- Elephant House (Sri Lanka)
- Eskimo (Nicaragua)
- Edy's Pie (formerly known as Eskimo Pie) (US)

=== F ===
- Fan Milk (Ghana)
- Fenocchio (France)
- Fieldbrook Farms (US)
- Freddy's Frozen Custard & Steakburgers (US)
- Friendly's (US)
- Frikom (Serbia)
- Froneri (UK)
- Frosteez Ice Cream (Barbados)

=== G ===
- GB Glace (Sweden)
- Gelato Italia (UK)
- Giolitti (Italy)
- Glacio (Belgium)
- Golden North (Australia)
- Good Humor (US)
- Graeter's (US)
- Grido Helado (Argentina)
- Grom (Italy)

=== H ===
- Havmor Ice Cream (India)
- Häagen-Dazs (US)
- Halo Top (US)
- Handel's Homemade Ice Cream & Yogurt (US)
- HB Ice Cream (Ireland)
- Hennig-Olsen Iskremfabrikk (Norway)
- Herrell's Ice Cream (US)
- Hershey Creamery Company (US)
- Hertog (Netherlands)
- Hjem-IS (Denmark)
- Howard Johnson's (US, defunct)
- Humboldt Creamery (US)

=== I ===
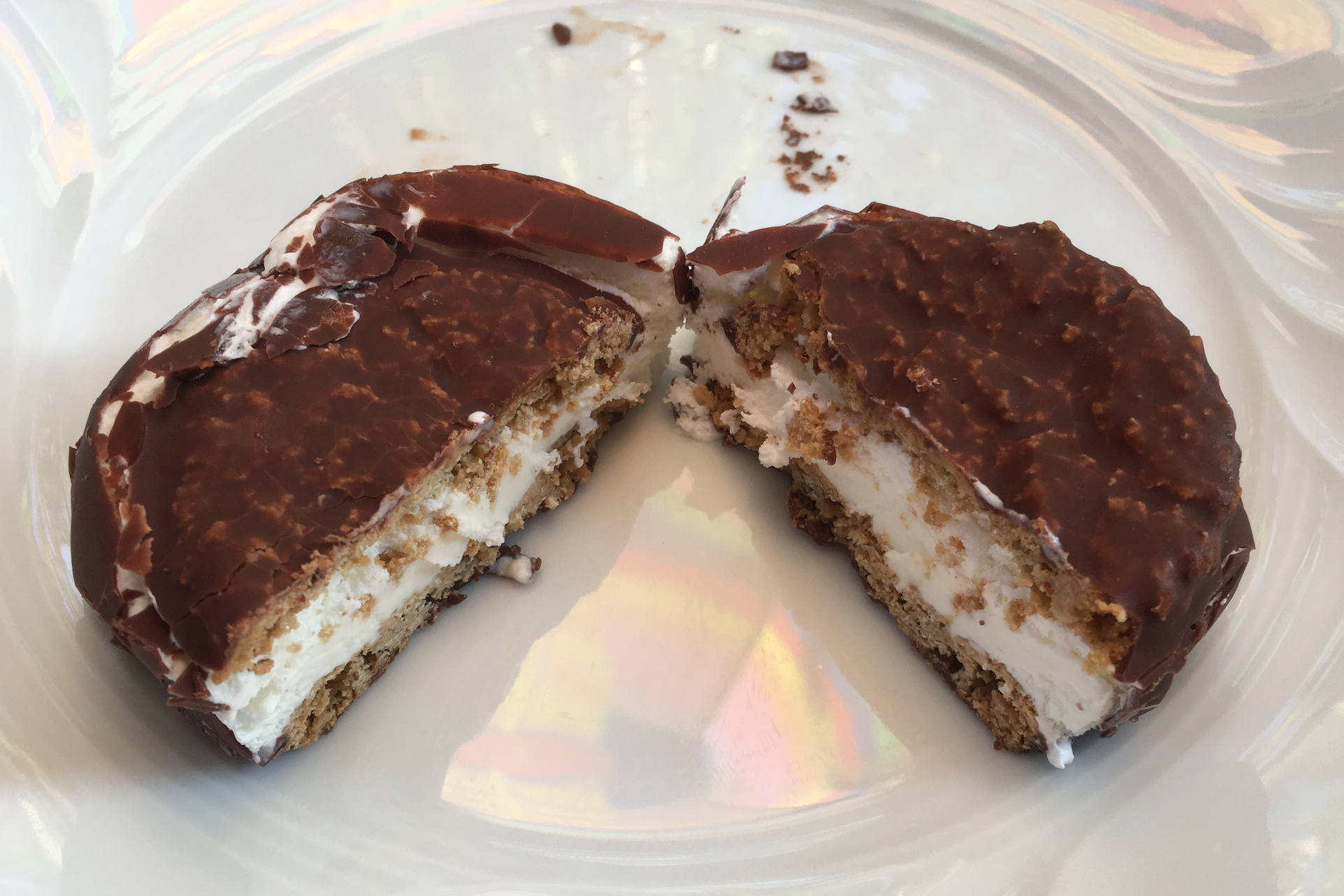
An It's-It Ice Cream ice cream sandwich

- Ideal Ice Cream (India)
- It's-It Ice Cream (US)

=== J ===
- J.P. Licks (US)
- Jack and Jill Ice Cream (US)
- Jeni's Splendid Ice Creams (US)
- Joe Delucci's (UK)

=== K ===
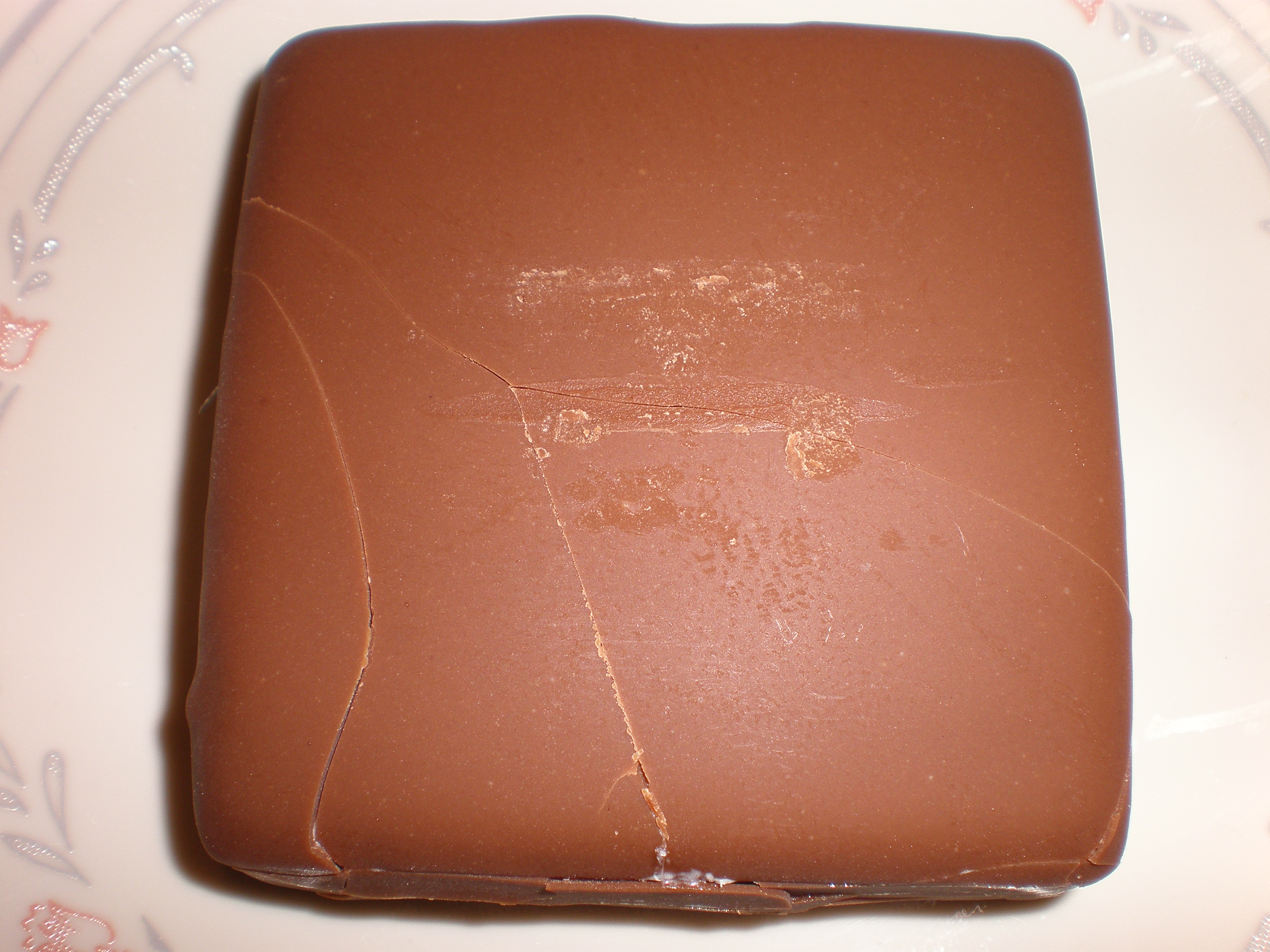
An original-flavor Klondike bar, consisting of chocolate-covered vanilla ice cream

- KaleidoScoops (US)
- Kawartha Dairy Company (Canada)
- Karnataka Milk Federation (India)
- Kelly's of Cornwall (UK)
- Kibon (Brazil)
- Klondike (US)
- Kowloon Dairy (Hong Kong)
- Kwality Wall's (India)
- Kyl21 (Germany)

=== L ===
- Langnese (Germany)
- Laura Secord (Canada)
- Ledo (Croatia)
- Lick Me I'm Delicious (UK)
- The Licktators (UK)
- Lovin' Scoopful (US)
- Lyons Maid (UK)

=== M ===
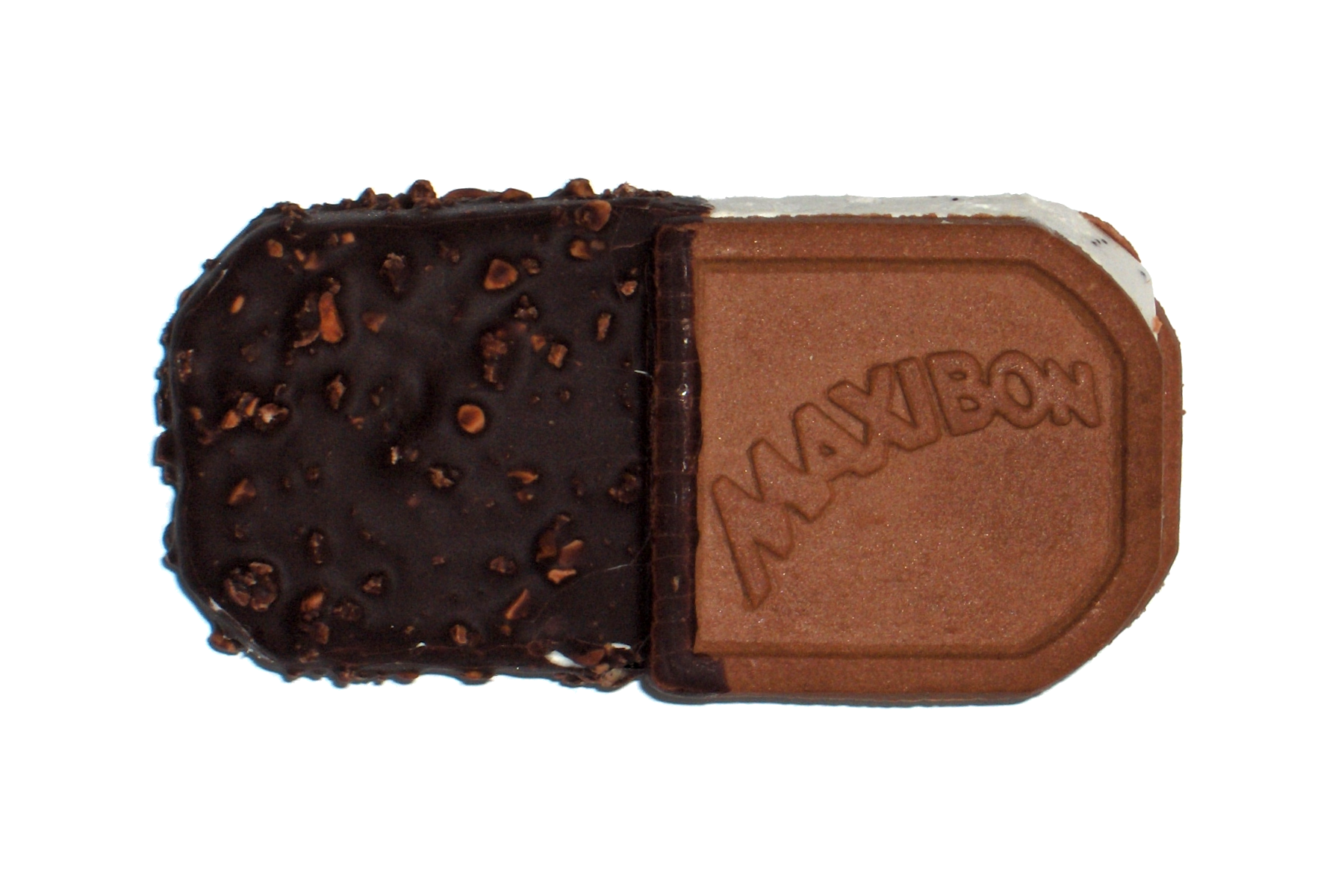
A Maxibon ice cream sandwich

- Mackie's (UK)
- Mado (Turkey)
- Magnolia (Philippines)
- Magnum (Denmark)
- Maola (US)
- Marble Slab Creamery (US)
- Mauds Ice Creams (Ireland)
- Maxibon (Belgium)
- Mayfield Dairy (US)
- Meiji (Japan)
- Milky Mist Dairy (India)
- Milma (India)
- Míša (Czech Republic)
- Morelli's (UK)
- Mother Dairy (India)
- Mövenpick Ice Cream (Switzerland)
- Mr. Green Tea Ice Cream Company (US)
- Murphys Ice Cream (Ireland)

=== N ===
- Natural Ice Cream (India)
- Neilson Dairy (Canada)
- New Zealand Natural (New Zealand)
- Nirula's (India)
- Nestle (Switzerland)

=== O ===
- Omoré (Pakistan)
- Oberweis Dairy (US)

=== P ===
- Paletería La Michoacana (Mexico)
- Paddle Pop (Australia)
- Pappagallo (Finland)
- Perry's Ice Cream (US)
- Peters Ice Cream (Australia)
- Pierre's Ice Cream Company (US)
- Pingviini (Finland)
- Polar Ice Cream (Malaysia)
- Presto Ice Cream (Philippines, defunct)
- Purity (US)

=== S ===
- Salt & Straw (US)
- Sealtest (US)
- Selecta (Philippines)
- Signature Select (US)
- Snugburys (UK)
- Solero (UK, Netherlands)
- Speelman's Ice Cream (US, defunct)
- Star Spangled Ice Cream (US, defunct)
- Stewart's Shops (US)
- Straus Family Creamery (US)
- Strauss (Israel)
- Streets (Australia)
- Stroh's Ice Cream (US)
- Sweet Republic Ice Cream (US)
- Swensen's (Canada)
- Swisslion Group (Serbia)

=== T ===
- Talenti (US)
- Tillamook (US)
- Tip Top (New Zealand)
- Tipsy Scoop
- Thrifty Ice Cream (US)
- Toscanini's (US)
- Turkey Hill (US)
- Tio Rico (Venezuela)

=== U ===
- United Dairy Farmers (US)

=== V ===
- Vadilal (India)
- Valio (Finland)
- Van Leeuwen (US)

=== W ===
- Wall's (UK)
- Whitey's Ice Cream (US)
- Wibbly Wobbly Wonder

=== Y ===
- Yarnell Ice Cream Co. (US)
- Ysco (Belgium)

== See also ==
- List of frozen dessert brands
- List of brand name food products
- List of dairy products
- List of desserts
- List of frozen food brands
- List of ice cream flavors
- List of ice cream parlor chains
