= Bonnie Doon =

Bonnie Doon or Bonny Doon may refer to:

== Places ==
- Bonnie Doon, Victoria, Australia
  - Bonnie Doon railway station
- Bonnie Doon, Queensland, Australia
- Bonnie Doon, Edmonton, Canada
  - Bonnie Doon stop, a tram stop
- Bonnie Doone, Ontario, Canada
- Bonny Doon, California, U.S.

== Other uses ==
- Arctostaphylos silvicola, or Bonny Doon manzanita
- Bonnie Doon Ice Cream, an American ice cream brand
- Bonny Doon (band), an American indie rock band from Detroit, Michigan

== See also ==
- "The Banks O' Doon", a 1791 song by Robert Burns
- River Doon, in Ayrshire, Scotland
