= Solero (ice cream) =

Brand of ice cream

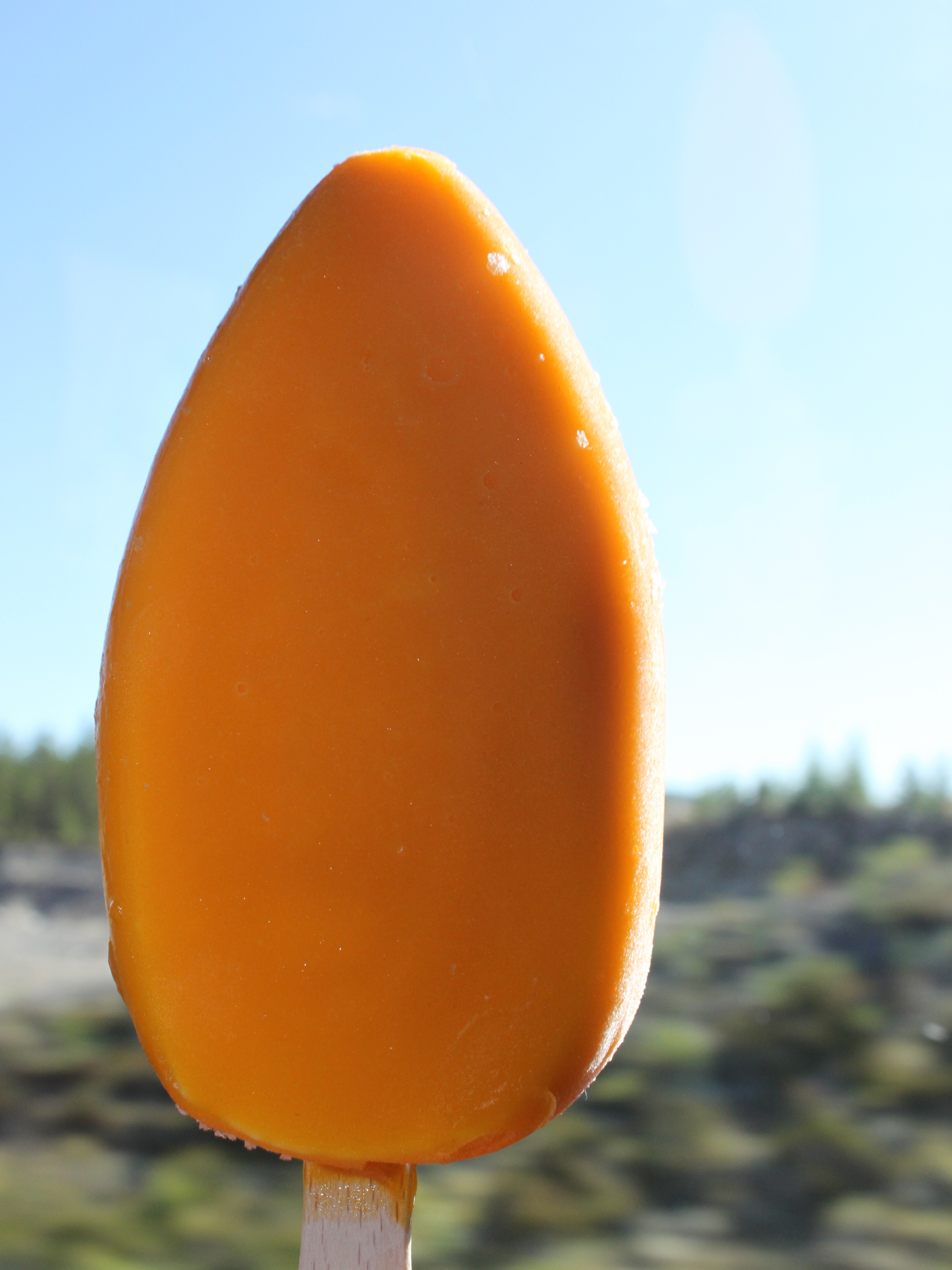
- Solero Exotic
- Alternative names: Salar
- Course: Ice cream
- Created by: Unilever
- Invented: 1994
- Serving temperature: Cold
- Variations: Exotic, Red Berries, Orange Burst
- Food energy (per serving): 98 kcal (410 kJ)

Solero is an ice cream brand, sold under the Heartbrand name in several countries, owned by The Magnum Ice Cream Company and first launched in 1994. In some countries, including Iran and the UAE, it is sold under the brand name Salar.

== See also ==
- List of ice cream brands
