= Sweet Republic =

Arizona-based chain of ice cream shops

- Founded: 2008
- Founders: Helen Yung, Jan Wichayanuparp
- Headquarters: Arizona
- Products: Ice cream
- Website: www.sweetrepublic.com

Sweet Republic is an Arizona-based chain of artisan ice cream shops with two retail locations and several retail outlets inside Whole Foods Market and Phoenix Sky Harbor International Airport. The company has been featured on Food Network and Cooking Channel.

Sweet Republic is noted for making each ice cream from scratch using founder Helen Yung's recipes, which can include atypical ingredients like corn, bacon, blue cheese, charcoal, and various ethnic flavors.

== History ==
The company's founders, Helen Yung and Jan Wichayanuparp, worked together at Citigroup, Inc, where they became friends and dreamed of one day owning a restaurant together. In 2002, Yung left Citigroup to attend Le Cordon Bleu culinary school in Sydney, Australia. The first Sweet Republic shop opened in 2006. Yung handles the culinary side of the company, while Wichayanuparp manages the business logistics.

In 2017, Wichayanuparp began a fellowship sponsored by the James Beard Foundation, which was designed to help female culinary entrepreneurs take their business to the next level.

== See also ==
- List of ice cream brands
