= Pappagallo (ice cream) =

Finnish brand of ice cream

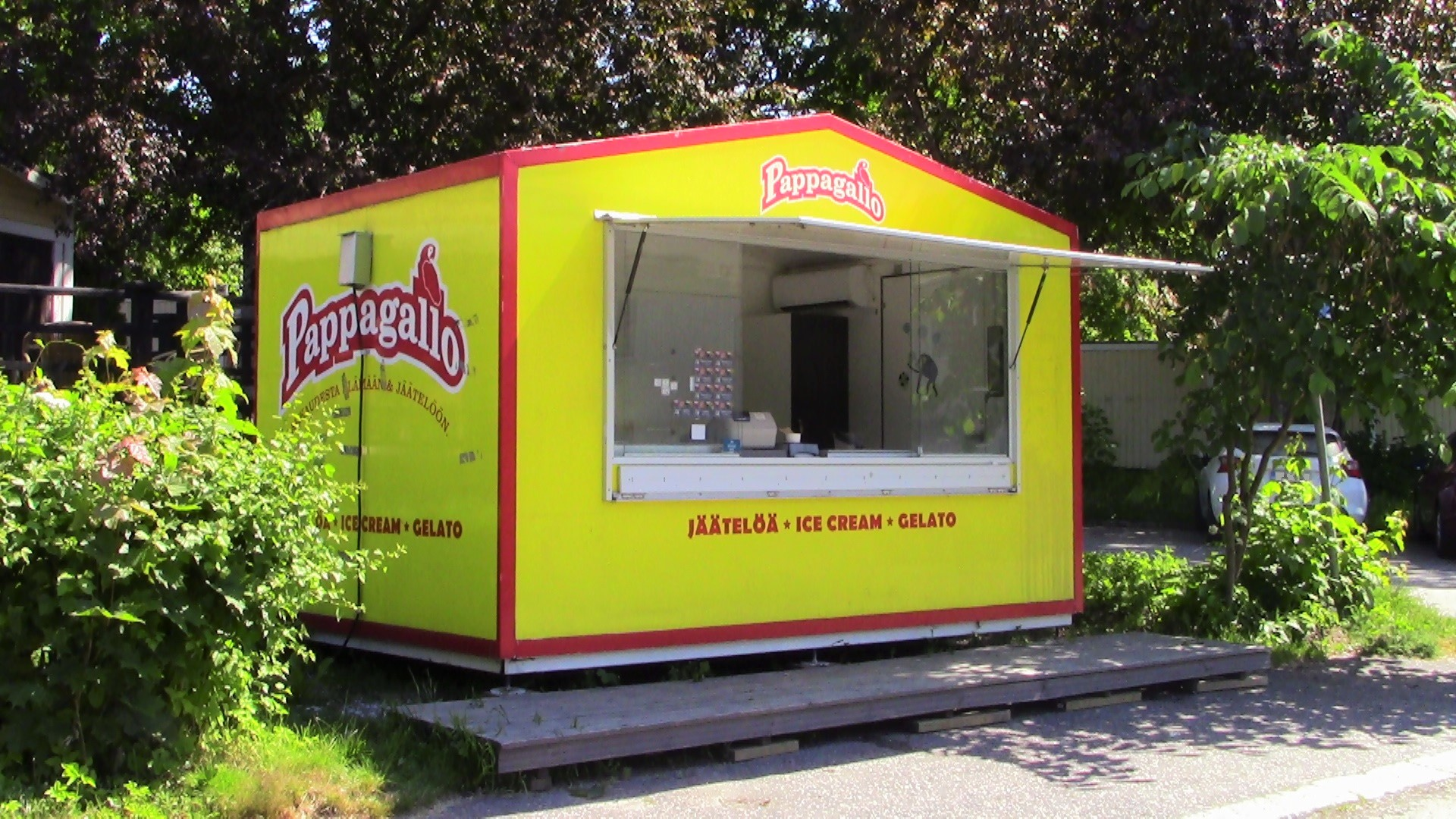
Pappagallo stand

Pappagallo is a Finnish brand of Italian ice cream and sorbet owned by the company Green Taste Oy. The products are mostly made by hand according to traditional Italian recipes. The products are produced in Vantaa. Pappagallo ice cream is gelato-style milk ice cream, containing 8 percent fat and about 24 percent sugar. The milk-free sorbet contains less than 1 percent fat and about 29 percent sugar.

The name Pappagallo means "parrot" in Italian.

== Activities ==
Pappagallo was brought to Finland by the Italian Giorgio Gallo. Production of ice cream then moved to the company Jäätelömestarit, which was bought by Arho Nordic in 2012. In March 2015 the company changed its name and is now operating as Green Taste.

== Evaluation ==
In summer 2010 Helsingin Sanomat evaluated the products offered by the Pappagallo kiosk in the Merituuli shopping centre in Suomenoja, Espoo. According to the reporter the raspberry sorbet was "like eating raspberries, it even had the seeds". The reporter also described the chocolate ice cream as dark and strong, the liquorice ice cream as tasting like salty liquorice. The vegan board of Animalia chose Pappagallo's mango sorbet as the milk-free ice cream product of the year in 2011, describing it as fresh, with an intense mango flavour, full-bodied, juicy, tasting like a real mango, fruity and suitably sweet.

== See also ==
- List of ice cream brands
