= Handel's Homemade Ice Cream & Yogurt =

American ice cream parlor chain

Handel's Enterprises LLC
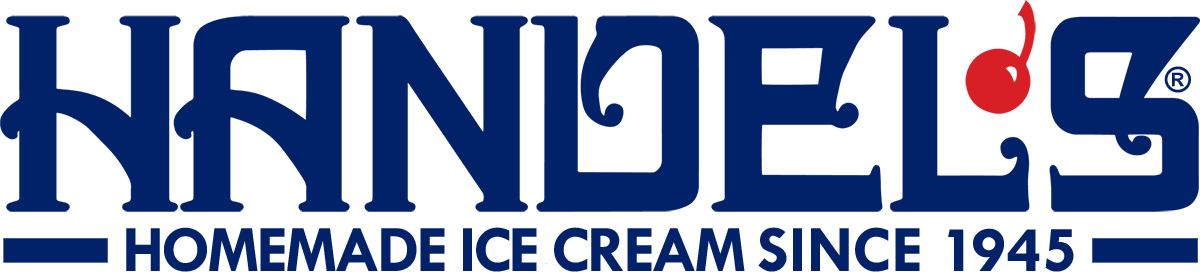
- Handel's current logo
- Trade name: Handel's Homemade Ice Cream
- Type: Private
- Industry: Dessert
- Genre: Ice cream parlor
- Founded: July 15, 1945; 81 years ago in Youngstown, Ohio, U.S.
- Founder: Alice Handel
- Headquarters: Canfield, Ohio, U.S.
- Number of locations: 175 as of 2026
- Area served: 20 states in the U.S.
- Products: Ice cream • frozen treats
- Revenue: ▲US$30 million (2018)
- Owner: Leonard Fisher
- Number of employees: 925 (2021)
- Website: handelsicecream.com

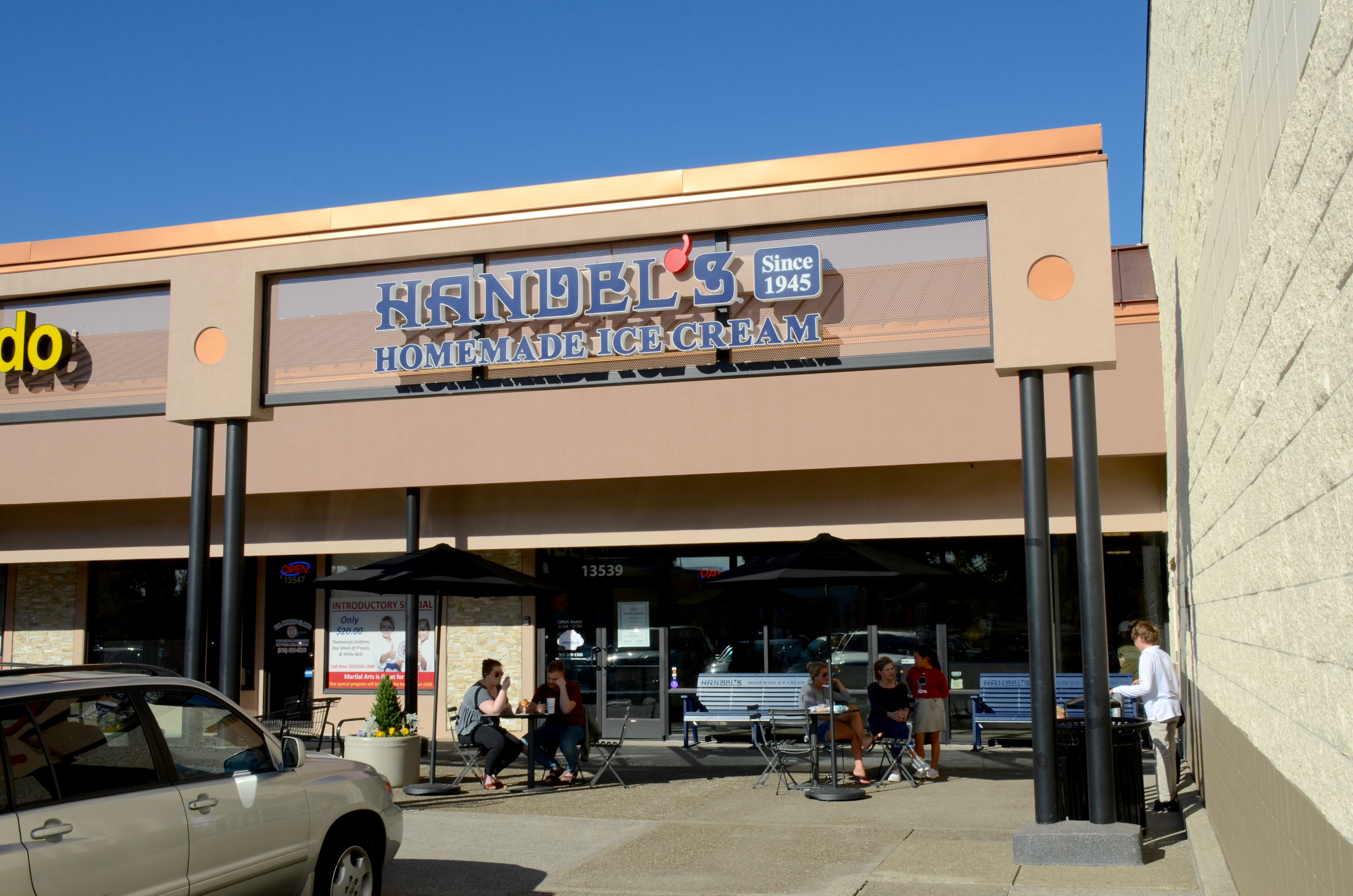
A Handel's Ice Cream shop in Oregon in 2018

Handel's Homemade Ice Cream is an ice cream company franchise founded by Alice Handel in 1945 in Youngstown, Ohio. As of April 2026, the company operates over 175 corporate and franchise stores in 20 states. Today, it is owned by Leonard Fisher and maintains a corporate headquarters in Canfield, Ohio. Handel's also has its own neighborhood district located in Youngstown.

== History ==
Handel's Ice Cream began when Alice Handel started serving ice cream from her husband's gas station in Youngstown, Ohio in the summer of 1945. The first batches were made using fresh fruit she picked from her own backyard, with old fashioned recipes. The menu includes over 150 flavors of ice cream.

== Recognition ==
Handel's success has been reported in various publications including the Travel Channel, which recognized Handel's as "One of the Best Ice Cream Parlors in the Country." In July 2002, USA Today rated it as one of the top-ten best ice cream businesses in the country. In 2020, Handel's was named as one of the top 500 franchises by Entrepreneur Magazine's Franchise 500 ranking. Ohio Restaurant News described Handel's as "The Busiest Ice Cream Stand in America". Chocolatier Magazine called Handel's "One of the Best Ice Creams in America." In 2006, National Geographic named Handel's the #1 ice cream in its 10 Best of Everything book. Handel's success has also been documented by People Magazine, U.S. News & World Report, and the book Everyone Loves Ice Cream.

== See also ==
- List of ice cream brands
