= Pingviini =

Finnish ice cream brand

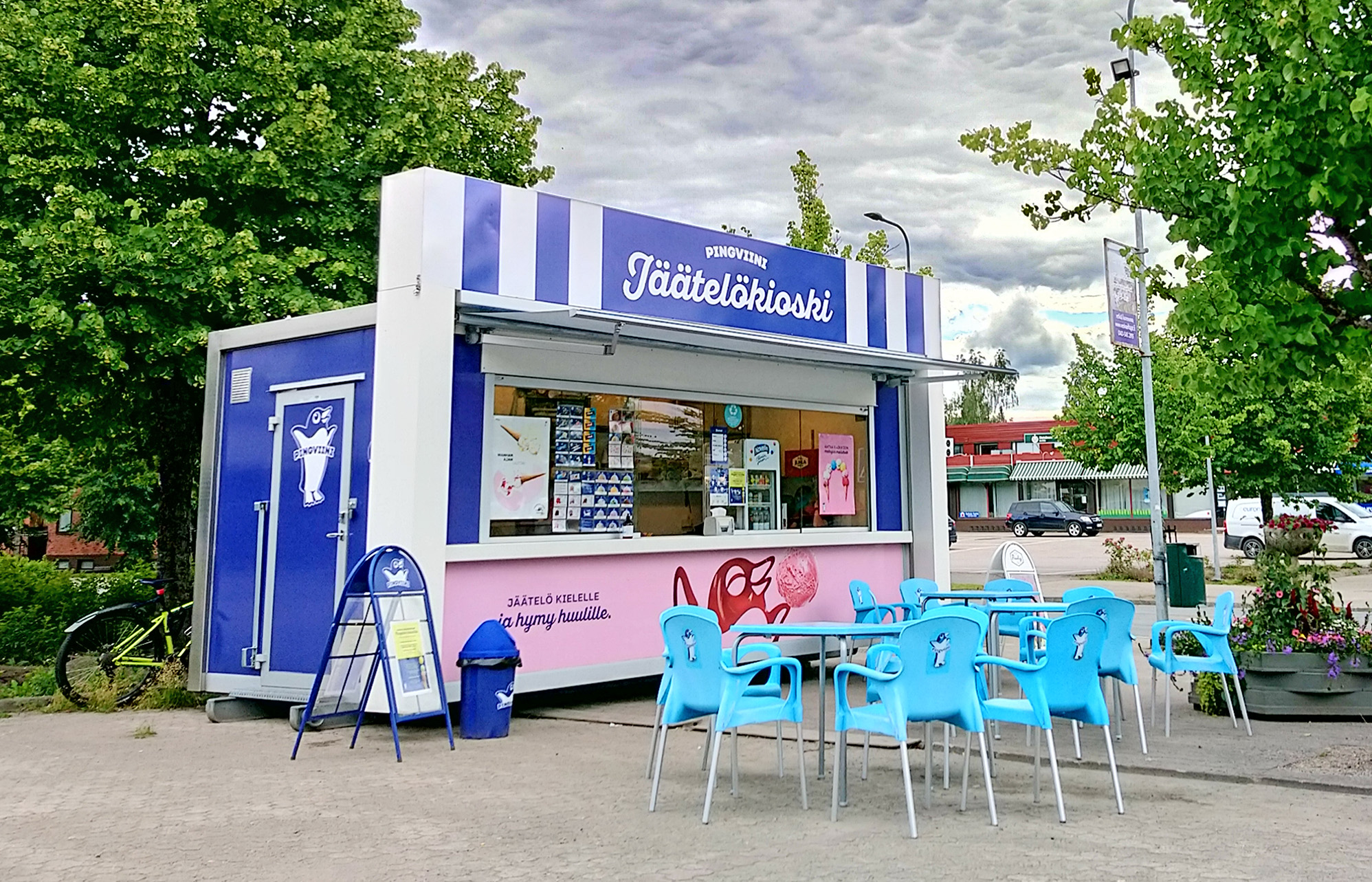
Pingviini ice cream stand

Pingviini (Finnish for "penguin") is a Finnish brand of ice cream owned by Froneri Finland. Known for its logo featuring a penguin, Pingviini brand ice cream has been sold in Finland since the 1930s.

Pingviini brand products are made at the Turenki ice cream factory in Janakkala. The brand has received an Avainlippu ("key flag") award because the ice cream is made in Finland by Finnish employees from Finnish milk.

Nestlé Finland bought the Pingviini brand in 2004. Development and production of the ice cream remain in Turenki. In 2016 Nestlé moved the brand to Froneri Finland, which it owns together with the British ice cream company R&R.

== History ==
The story of the Pingviini brand started in 1935 when Oy Jäätelö - Glass Ab started producing ice cream in the "newest and most modern ice cream factory" in Helsinki. After a couple of years Valio bought the company's Pingviini brand.

The first ice cream products were made in Turku, but later the ice cream was also produced in Helsinki, Vyborg and Tampere and also later in Oulu. The Turenki ice cream factory was founded in 1962.

At first the ice cream was sold in waffle cones and on plates at Valio dairy shops and kiosks. In 1936 Valio founded the first ice cream parlor in Finland at the Lasipalatsi building in Helsinki. Later ice cream kiosks spread throughout Finland. Nowadays there are about 200 Pingviini ice cream kiosks all over Finland every summer.

Nestlé bought Valio's ice cream product line and a fixed term of 10 years of rights to the Valiojäätelö brand in 2004. Development and production of the ice cream remain in Turenki.

== The Turenki ice cream factory ==
Pingviini products are developed and produced at the Froneri Finland ice cream factory in Turenki, Janakkala. The Turenki ice cream factory was built in 1962 to meet the increase of ice cream consumption in Finland. Nowadays the factory is one of the largest and most modern ice cream factories in the Nordic countries and employs about 200 people, or as much as 300 people during high season.

The baseline of the ice cream development in the Turenki factory is meeting the flavour and quality demands of the Finnish consumers. For example, the Aino ice cream product line including Nordic berry flavours such as cranberry, blueberry and Arctic cloudberry as well as liquorice has been developed in Turenki. In 2019 the Aino product line was joined by Aino oat ice cream.

There is an ice cream bar at the factory yard, meant for guest groups and educational use. Many schoolchild groups all over the Finland visit the ice cream bar. At the height of the class trip season in May there are about 1,500 to 2,000 visitors.

== Marketing ==
At first Pingviini's penguin logo was black-and-white. During the following years several different colours were attempted, such as red in the 1980s, until it got its current blue-and-white appearance in the early 1990s. The Pingviini ice cream cone also came to the market in the middle 1990s.

== Products ==
Brand names under the Pingviini brand include Pingviini, Aino, Classic, Puffet, Muru, Pingviini Puikko (known as Eskimo until 2021) and PEHMIS. Retail products also include the one-litre Pingviini home packages including about twenty different flavours, ice cream cones, ice cream sticks such as Classic, and home packages from the Aino product line.

The loose ice cream product line sold at kiosks and cafés includes about 30 different flavours as well as annual special flavours which have included flavours such as tar (2009) and bubble gum (2019).

Pehmis is a registered trademark of the company and use of the name is protected. The protection is intended to avoid confusing similar products with the original Pehmis brand.

== See also ==
- List of ice cream brands
