= Kyl21 =

German ice cream brand

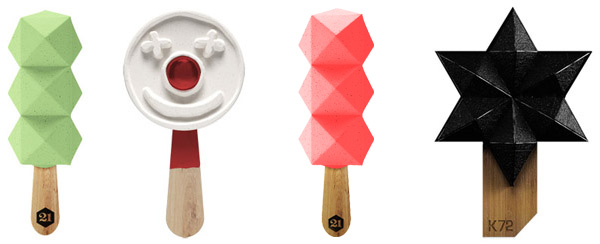
Kyl21 popsicles

Kyl21 is a German ice cream brand that produces vegan and alcoholic popsicles in unusual geometric shapes. The apparent lack of any visible company activity caused major uproar among investors accusing David Marx of fraudulent behavior.

== History ==
The science-food-company Molekyleis Produktionsgesellschaft mbH (Kyl) was founded in 2014 by product designer and marketing specialist David Marx in Berlin. David Marx produces flash-frozen ice using his own technology based on liquid nitrogen, which allows for the popsicles to have a geometric shape. The molekylice is produced at around −200 °C (−328.0 °F).

The molekylice came out of the Science Kitchen - an independent food lab based in Berlin that specialized in molecular gastronomy by inventing and developing food products for a sustainable, vegan-friendly future. The Molekylice is produced in Los Angeles (under the brand name DreamPops) and China (under the brand name BOOM).

The apparent lack of any visible company activity caused major uproar among investors accusing David Marx of fraudulent behavior.

== See also ==
- List of ice cream brands
