= Havmor Ice Cream =

Indian ice cream manufacturer

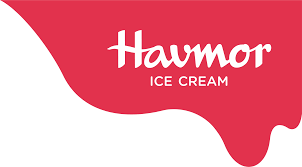
- Type: Private Company
- Industry: Consumer Staples
- Founded: 1944; 82 years ago
- Founder: Satish Chandra Chona
- Headquarters: Ahmedabad, Gujarat, India
- Key people: Kyungwoon Cho; (Chairman); Komal Anand; (Managing Director)
- Products: Ice cream
- Revenue: ▲₹1,200 crore (2024)
- Owner: Lotte Wellfood (2017–present); HRPL Pvt Ltd (till 2017)
- Number of employees: 741
- Parent: Lotte Wellfood
- Website: www.havmor.com

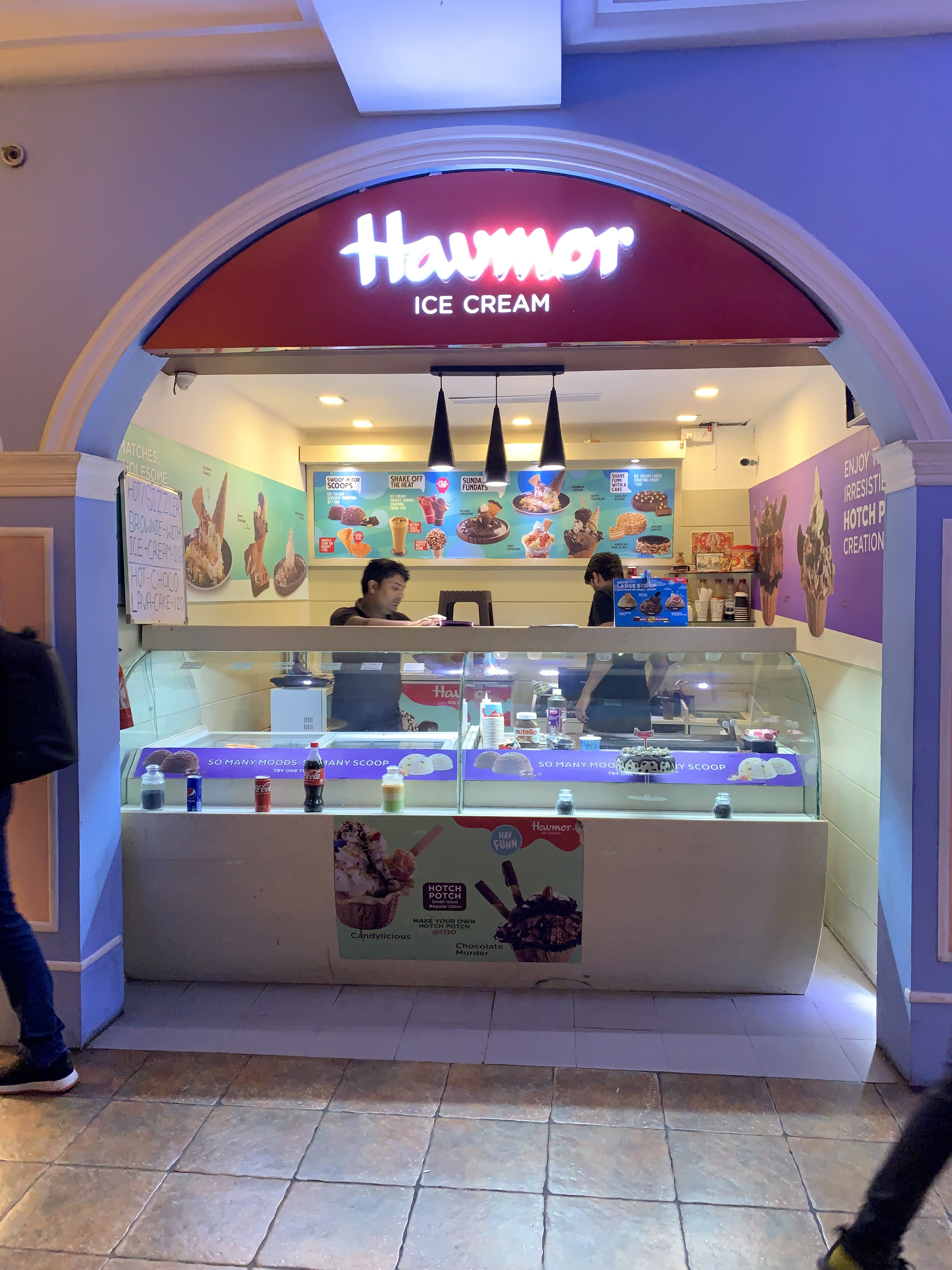
A Havmor outlet in WTP, Jaipur

Havmor Ice Cream Company Private Limited is an Indian ice cream manufacturer. Havmor was founded in 1944, and its registered office is located in Ahmedabad, Gujarat. The company is owned and operated by Lotte Wellfood after its acquisition in 2017.

== History ==
Havmor was founded by Satish Chandra Chona as 'Have More' in 1944 in Colonial India in Karachi (now in Pakistan). Chona was an engineer who used to work for BOAC (of British Airways). After his day job he started working at his uncle’s restaurant, where he learnt to make ice-creams. After partition, he shifted to Dehradun, where he started a small shop. Later, he moved to Indore and then eventually to Gujarat. There, Chona set up the first outlet on Relief Road. In 1960s, the brand name was changed from 'Have More' to 'Havmor'.

In April 2013, it partnered with Zydus Wellness, a group company of Cadila Healthcare, to source ingredients for its "Sugar Free" ice cream range and to use the "Sugar Free" brand for its products.

In 2017, Lotte Confectionery, a South Korean company acquired Havmor for ₹1,020 crore (US$110 million). The then Managing Director of the company, Ankit Chona, who is grandson of founder Satish Chona, told "If someone takes the business and makes it grow much faster and take it to the national level, then we are happy to look at the brand going into a such suitable hands."

In December 2021, ITC Master Chef partnered with Havmor Ice Cream to distribute frozen snacks through Havmor's ice cream carts in Delhi-NCR.

In January 2023, its parent, Lotte Confectionery announced an investment of ₹4.5 billion (USD 55.1 million) in its Indian unit, Havmor Ice Cream, to build a new greenfield plant at MIDC Talegaon in Pune, Maharashtra, over the next five years.

In August 2024, it was reported that Lotte Wellfood had merged its Indian subsidiaries, Lotte India and Havmor Ice Cream, to form an integrated entity named One India, with the merger expected to be completed in the second half of the year.

In 2013, Havmor collaborated with the movie Krrish 3 to introduce a custom-packaged ice cream range. As part of this campaign, actor Hrithik Roshan endorsed Havmor ice creams.

In September 2020, the company launched a web series titled Havmor Passport, starring actor Malhar Thakar and written and directed by Manan Desai.

== Operations ==
Havmor Ice Cream operates in more than 20 states, has 216 exclusive ice cream parlours, and a network of over 60,000 dealers in India. The company has approximately 70,000 selling points across India, catering to urban markets. It has manufacturing plants in Ahmedabad, Gujarat, Faridabad, Haryana and one in Solapur, Maharashtra, which was launched in 2019. It also established a state-of-the-art facility in Pune, Maharashtra.

== Awards and recognition ==
In 2014 and 2015, Havmor won the 'Times Food Award' for the 'Best Ice Cream Shop'. Havmor won the 'Times Food Award' for 'Best Snacks - Vegetarian' award in 2016. In 2017, it won the 'Times Food Award' for the 'Best Ice Cream in Casual Dining'. And in 2019, it won the 'Times Food Award' for the 'Best Ice Cream Parlor - Casual Dining'.

In 2021, Havmor received the Times Food & Nightlife Award in the Desserts Casual Dining category from The Times of India.

== See also ==
- List of ice cream brands
