= Natural Ice Cream =

Indian ice cream brand

- Product type: Ice cream
- Current owner: Kamaths Ourtimes Ice Creams Pvt. Ltd.
- Country: India
- Introduced: 1984
- Markets: India
- Tagline: Taste the Original
- Website: naturalicecreams.in
- Revenue: ▲₹374 crore (US$40 million) (FY24)
- Net income: ▲₹45 crore (US$4.8 million) (FY24)

Natural Ice Cream, doing business as Naturals, is an Indian ice cream brand owned by Mumbai-based Kamaths Ourtimes Ice Creams Pvt. Ltd. It was founded by Raghunandan Srinivas Kamath who opened his first store in Mumbai in 1984.

The chain recorded a retail turnover of ₹374 crore in the financial year 2024, up from ₹115 crores in 2015. The ice creams are manufactured by Kamaths Ourtimes Ice Creams Pvt. Ltd. and retailed by its subsidiary company Kamaths Natural Retail Pvt. Ltd.

There was rebranding effort in 2017, which established the ‘Taste the Original’ tagline, aimed to set it apart from similar named brands popping up.

== Market ==
As of April 2022, the chain has 18 directly owned stores and 119 franchised stores across 11 states. The stores are present in the states of Maharashtra, West Bengal, Karnataka, Goa, Tamil Nadu, Telangana, Kerala, Madhya Pradesh, Chhattisgarh, Gujarat, Rajasthan and Delhi NCR.

== Production and trade ==
The brand's only production facility is situated in Charkop, a suburb of Kandivali in Mumbai, India. The company supplies to its stores every day. The company spends less than 1% of its sales revenues on advertising, relying mainly on word of mouth to attain revenues.

After two years of foundation of the company, the brand launched a concept store in Juhu named Naturals Now, which serves freshly churned ice cream straight out of the churner.

== Products ==
Starting with around 10 flavours, Natural Ice Cream has 125 flavour options, of which 20 are offered throughout the year. The set of flavours change according to seasons. Some of the seasonal flavors include litchi, fig, jackfruit, Muskmelon and watermelon. A custard apple flavor is also purveyed by the brand.

== Awards and recognition ==
In 2006, the brand received Corporation Bank's National SME's Excellence Award in the Food and Agro Industry. In February 2009, a Natural Ice Cream store located in the Juhu Ville Parle Development scheme placed in the Limca Book of Records for the largest ice cream slab, which weighed 3,000 kilograms. The brand was awarded as Best in Customer Service - Regional Retailer Of the Year in 2013. In 2014, the brand received the gold medal for most innovative ice cream flavour (cucumber) in the Great Indian Ice Cream Contest. In 2016, Natural Ice Cream was awarded for home grown concept in food service by Coca-Cola Golden Spoon Awards and also received IMAGES Most Admired Food Service Chain of the Year in the Ice-cream & Dessert Parlours category. It was named as India’s Top 10 brand for customer experience in a KPMG survey.

== See also ==
- List of ice cream brands
