= Polar Ice Cream =

Malaysian food company

Polar Ice Cream Sdn Bhd
- Company type: Private Limited Company
- Industry: Ice cream
- Founded: 3 March 1988; 38 years ago in Balakong Road, Selangor, Malaysia
- Headquarters: MIEL Industries Estate, Cheras, Malaysia
- Key people: Dato Chong Kim Key
- Website: www.polaricecream.com.my

Polar Ice Cream Sdn Bhd (doing business as Polar Ice Cream) is one of the largest ice cream suppliers company in Malaysia since 1988. The company produces a variety of ice cream that is distributed in supermarkets, convenience stores, food services and mobile hawkers all over Malaysia.

== History ==
The company started from a small factory on Balakong Road, Selangor with only 5 workers, producing a wide range of ice cream such as ice cream sticks, ice cream in cups, ice cream in cones, ice cream in tubs and ice cream with wafers but only limited to Malaysia during that time. On 6 March 2010, the company opened its new factory. Since then, Polar Ice Cream is distributed to China, New Zealand, Vietnam, Myanmar, Taiwan, Laos, Cambodia, Singapore and Brunei. Beside that, the company also planned to enter India, Sri Lanka and Middle East markets.

== See also ==
- List of ice cream brands
