= Vadilal =

Indian ice cream manufacturer

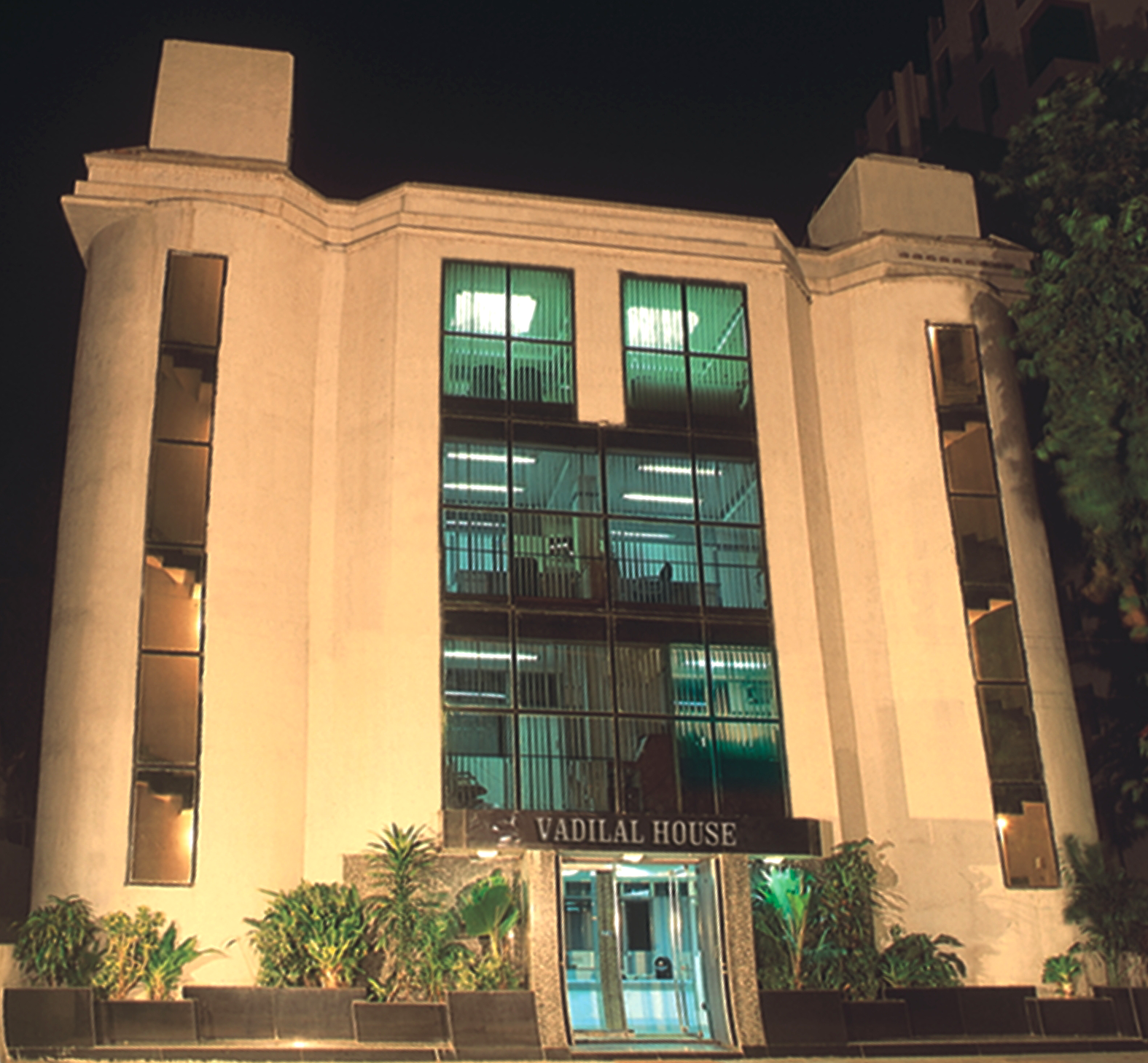
- Vadilal House in Ahmedabad
- Type: Public
- Traded as: BSE: 519156; NSE: VADILALIND
- Industry: Conglomerate
- Founded: 1907; 119 years ago
- Headquarters: Ahmedabad, Gujarat, India
- Products: Foreign Exchange; Ice cream; Ice cream cakes; Ultra-processed food; Real Estate; Chemicals
- Revenue: ▲₹1,057 crore (US$110 million) (FY23)
- Net income: ▲₹96 crore (US$10 million) (FY23)
- Number of employees: 1,000
- Parent: Vadilal Group
- Website: vadilalicecreams.com

Vadilal Industries is an Indian multinational company specializing in ice cream and frozen food products. The company was established in 1907 by Vadilal Gandhi in Ahmedabad.

== History ==
In 1907, Vadilal made its first ice cream "using the traditional kothi method", with a hand-cranked machine. In 1926, it introduced its dedicated ice cream parlours, and began offering home delivery.

The brand introduced the cassata to Indian audiences in 1950. Vadilal expanded in 1985 and later introduced India's first automated ice cream candy line machinery.

In 1989, the company went public and launched its IPO. This was followed by the opening of their first ice cream plant in Bareilly, Uttar Pradesh in 1993. Two years later in 1995, they began exporting their sub-brands to over 26 countries.

In 2012, the company introduced an extrusion machine and cone-making machine.

In 2017, Vadilal unveiled a new logo accompanied by the tagline, "Dil Bole Waah Waah Waah" (The Heart Says Wow Wow Wow).

== Products ==
Vadilal produces ice cream cones, candies, bars, ice-lollies, cups, family packs, and economy packs, in a variety of flavours. All their products are vegetarian and free of eggs.

In the 1990s, Vadilal diversified into the processed foods industry, including frozen vegetables, ready-to-eat snacks, curries, and breads for the domestic and export markets. The company received a certification in 2013 for meeting the global standards for food safety by the Bureau Veritas.

In 2011, the brand released a new range of ice creams including Flingo cones and Badabite bars, as well as a premium line of ice cream tubs called the Gourmet Premium Ice Creams.

They also introduced a Gourmet Natural Tub line in 2021, which focuses on traditional Indian dessert flavours like gulab jamun, falooda, and kesar rasmalai among others.

In 2021, Vadilal introduced Vadilal Now For Ever cafe in Ahmedabad, Gujarat.

As of 2023, the company has a network of over 125,000 dealers across India.

== See also ==
- List of ice cream brands
