= Lick Me I'm Delicious =

British food and event company

- Founded: UK (2011)
- Founder: Charlie Harry Francis
- Website: lickmeimdelicious.com

Lick Me I'm Delicious (sometimes abbreviated to LMID) is a United Kingdom-based experiential food and event company. Founded in 2011, the company creates interactive food experiences and theatrical dessert installations for corporate events, brand activations, exhibitions, and private functions. The company is known for combining culinary techniques with technology and performance to create immersive food-based experiences.

== History ==
The company was founded in 2011 by food inventor and creative director Charlie Harry Francis. They became recognised for pioneering nitrogen ice cream production at events rather than in a restaurant setting. In 2014, the company created an edible mist machine which emits flavored mists that taste like various foods and has no calories.

== Products ==
Lick Me I'm Delicious is known for designing proprietary food inventions that combine culinary techniques with interactive presentation. They produce ice cream with exotic ingredients. One flavour is made with jellyfish protein that retails at over £140 per scoop. The company also sells and rents a machine that produces edible mists in over two hundred flavors.

== See also ==
- List of ice cream brands
