= Snugburys =

English ice cream manufacturer

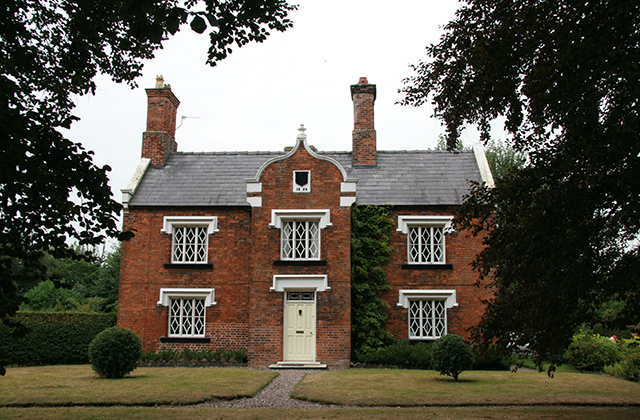
- Park Farm
- Coordinates: 53°05′15″N 2°33′55″W
- Website: www.snugburys.co.uk

Snugburys is an English ice cream manufacturer based at Park Farm in Hurleston, near Nantwich, in the county of Cheshire. Snugburys makes over 35 flavours of ice cream. In addition to ice cream production, Snugburys also regularly produces large sculptures made of steel-reinforced straw.

== Location ==
Snugburys operates out of a Cheshire farm (with associated farm shop) called Park Farm or Snugbury's Ice Cream Farm. It is located on Chester Road in Hurleston near Nantwich in the United Kingdom, near to the Llangollen Canal. In February 2019 Snugburys opened their second location in Chester, called Snugburys on the River.

== History ==
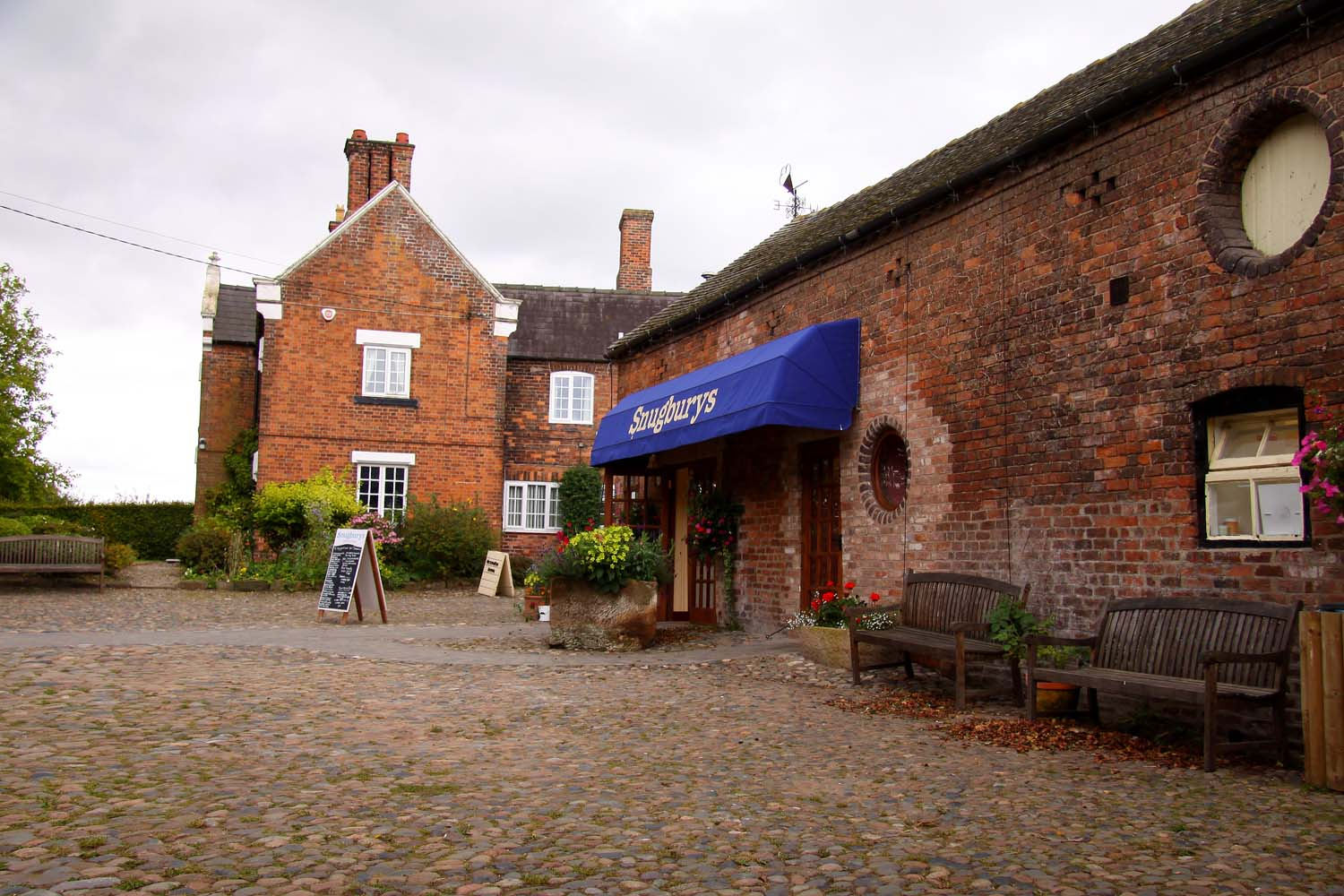
The ice cream shop at Snugburys

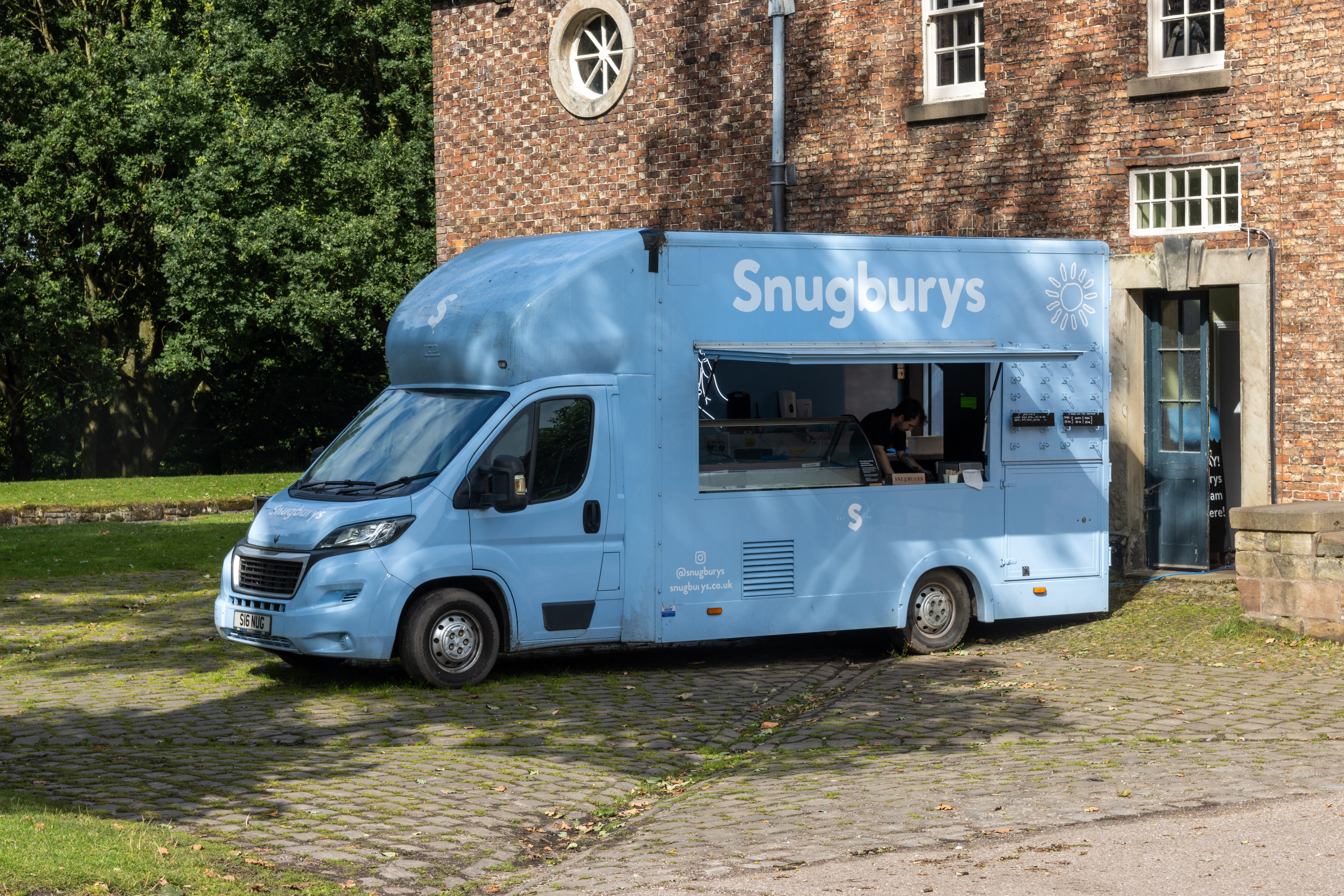
Ice cream van at Dunham Massey in 2024

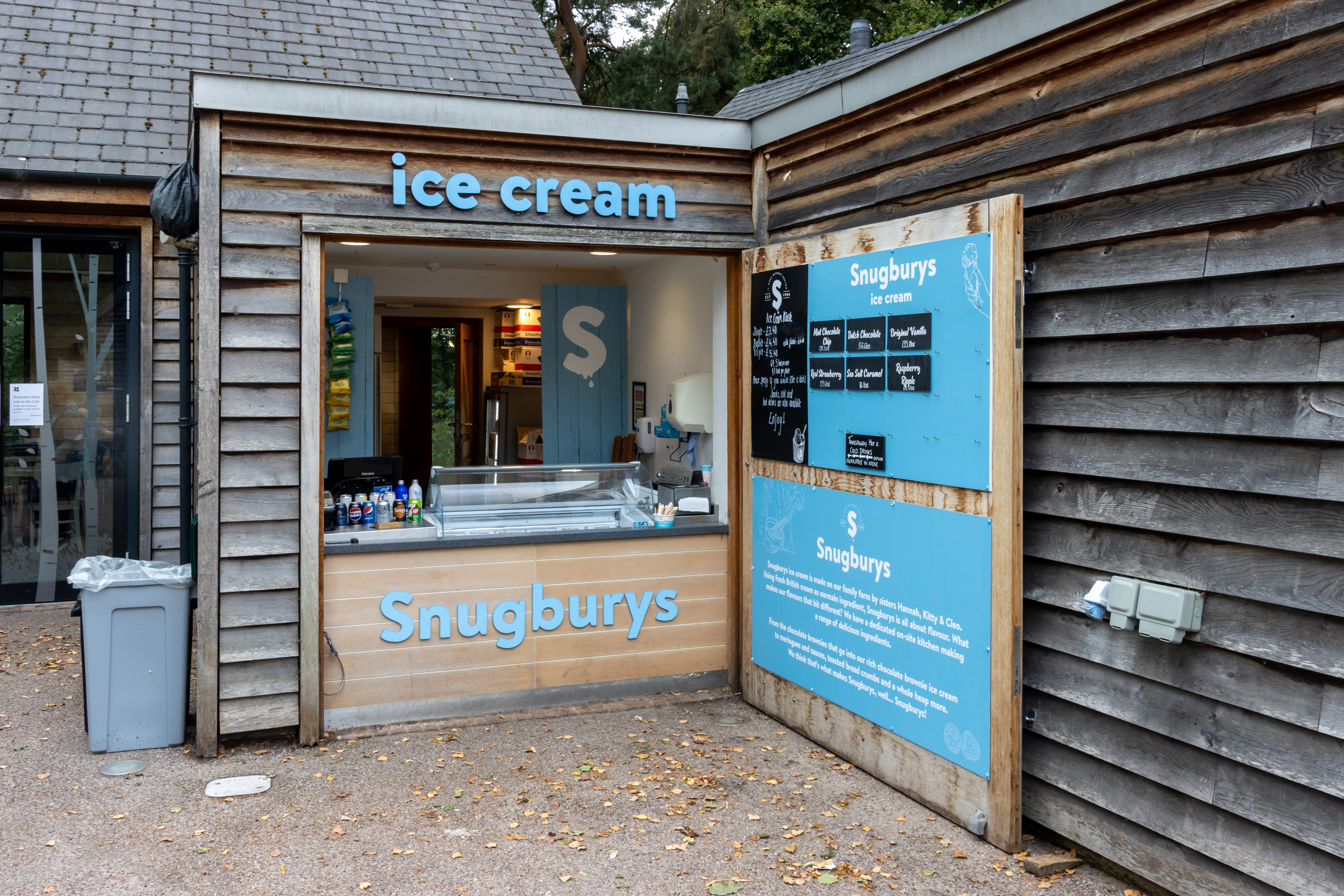
Outlet at Dunham Massey in 2024

The business was founded in 1986. It was converted from a dairy farm to an ice cream factory by Chris and Cheryl Sadler. It opened a new ice cream shop in the barn on the site in 2011, and has three ice cream vans. They opened an ice cream parlour in the Lakeside Cafe at Trentham Estate in 2016. Snugburys produces around 35 flavours of ice cream, which have included flavours like damson and sloe gin and toffee crumble.

The business was taken over by the Sadlers' daughters Hannah, Kitty, and Cleo when their parents retired in 2016; the sisters became directors of the company in November 2015.

In 2020, Snugburys launched their drive-thru at their Nantwich site in response to the Covid pandemic, offering take home tubs of ice cream.

== Straw sculptures ==
Snugburys has been making straw sculptures since 1998, when its first straw sculpture portrayed the Millennium Dome. The sculptures are reinforced with steel, and are constructed to attract visitors to the farm and to raise money for charity. In 2015 the Guinness Book of Records included mention of Snugbury's straw Dalek as the "Largest Dalek sculpture". The sculptures are created by Mike Harper of Harbrook Engineering.

=== List of sculptures ===
Photo	Year	Subject	Notes
	1998	Millennium Dome	Nicknamed "Millennium Cone"
	2002	Commonwealth Games	Nicknamed "Cone-Wealth Games 2002".
	2003	Dinosaur	Nicknamed "Coneastrawus". Idea by Liz Considine, made by Mike Harper.
	2004	Angel of the North	Nicknamed "Angel from the North West". Donations supported Hope House Children's Hospice.
	2005	Millennium Wheel	Made of steel and straw.
	2006	Sputnik	Nicknamed "The Snugnik Rocket".
	2007	Lovell Telescope	Nicknamed "Dish of the Day". Subject was decided by a competition, and celebrated the 50th anniversary of the Lovell Telescope and the space age. Weighed 6 tonnes, with a 32 feet (9.8 m) diameter dish. Donations went to Kids Company.
	2008	Windmill	
	2009	Big Ben	Celebrated the 150th anniversary of the clock tower. Featured a working, illuminated clock.
	2010	Meerkat	36 feet (11 m) tall, built on a 6 feet (1.8 m) base. Had illuminated eyes. £2,880 of donations went to Railway Children (charity).
	2011	Polar bear	38 feet (12 m) tall, 9 tonnes (3 tonnes of straw). Donations went to The Children's Adventure Farm Trust.
	2012	Olympic cyclist	Representing British cycling Olympians. 35 feet (11 m) tall (the bike was 8 feet (2.4 m) tall), weighing 7 tonnes. Took 17 man-weeks to construct. The curve represented the Manchester Velodrome. Donations went to the cyclists and chosen charities.
	2013	Dalek	Nicknamed "Dalick". Marking the 50th anniversary of Doctor Who. 35 feet (11 m) tall made of 6 tonnes of straw, 5 tonnes of steel, and 700 man-hours. £3,000 of donations went to Cancer Research UK, as the father of one of the company's staff was being treated for cancer. The head and plunger of the sculpture moved, and it played back "Exterminate!" Mentioned in the 2015 Guinness Book of Records.
	2015	Cowboy on horse	20 feet (6.1 m) tall. Made of weathering steel with copper. Donations went to Riding for the Disabled.
	2016	Peter Rabbit	38 feet (12 m) tall, 8 tonnes (8,000 kg). Accompanied by a 10 feet (3.0 m) carrot, 10 foot ears, and giant plastic blue jacket. Took 1,000 man-hours to create. It was created to celebrate the 150th birthday of Beatrix Potter, and donations went to The Children's Adventure Farm Trust. It was destroyed by fire at 5.30pm on 2 February 2017 in a suspected arson attack, and a fundraising campaign to rebuild it was subsequently launched. It was rebuilt in 2017, and stood at the site until 2019.
	2019	Bumblebee	40 feet (12 m) high, made of straw and black-dyed wood, donations go to the Bumblebee Conservation Trust.
	2024	Paddington Bear	50 feet (15 m) high. Metal, willow, straw, supporting the MPS Society.
