= Maola =

American dairy company

Maola Local Dairies
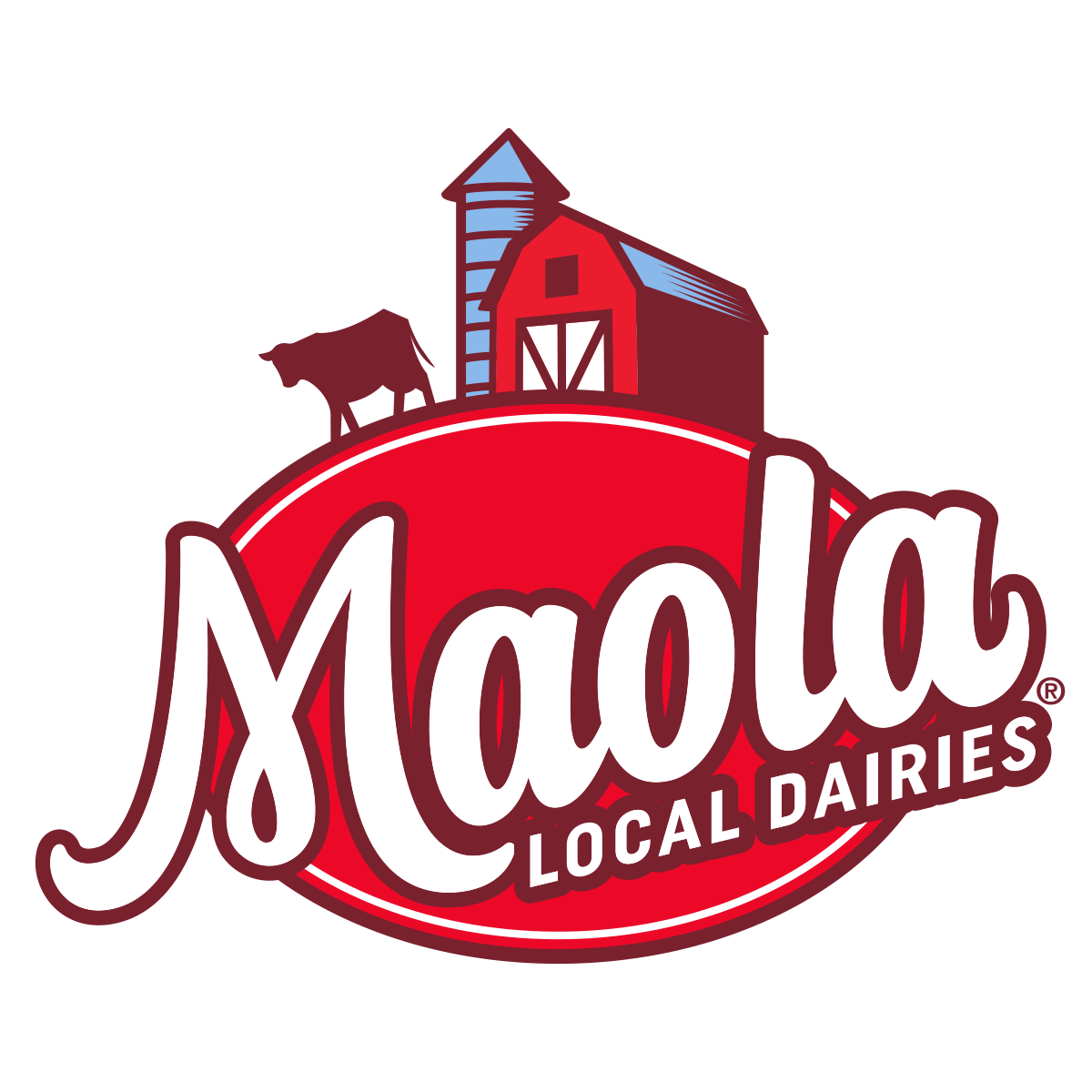
- Logo since 2018
- Company type: Subsidiary
- Industry: Food
- Founded: 1935; Washington, North Carolina, United States
- Headquarters: Herndon, Virginia, United States
- Area served: North Carolina, South Carolina, Virginia, Maryland, Washington, D.C.
- Products: Dairy
- Number of employees: 800+
- Parent: Maryland & Virginia Milk Producers Cooperative Association, Inc.
- Website: http://www.maolamilk.com

Maola Local Dairies is a dairy company located in Herndon, Virginia, United States. The company was purchased by Maryland & Virginia Milk Producers Cooperative Association, Inc., currently based in Herndon, Virginia, in 2003.

Maola branded products are now made at facilities in High Point, North Carolina; Philadelphia, Pennsylvania; Landover, Maryland; and Newport News, Virginia.

== History ==
Maola was founded in Washington, North Carolina and made milk and ice cream dairy products since 1935. Before being sold to Maryland & Virginia Milk Producers Cooperative Association, Inc., the company produced 100,000 gallons of milk per day and sold 1.5 million gallons of ice cream annually.

During its operation from New Bern, products were distributed throughout North Carolina as well as parts of South Carolina and Virginia including milk, ice cream, juices, custard and novelties.

The processing plant in New Bern closed in 2014 after 79 years of production.
