= Fenocchio =

French ice cream parlour

Fenocchio Ice-Cream Parlour is an ice cream company in France.

== About ==
Fenocchio Ice-Cream Parlour opened in 1966 on Place Rossetti in Nice's old town. There are 94 flavors of 59 ice creams and 35 sorbets such as Thyme, Rosemary, Cactus, Beer, Black Olive, Violet, Rose, Tomato & Basil, Lavender, etc. There are also Fenocchio's selection of extravagant ice cream cakes. The second shop opened in 1988 at 6 Rue de la Poissonnerie in Nice's old town near Cours Saleya.
