= Joe Delucci's =

British frozen dessert company

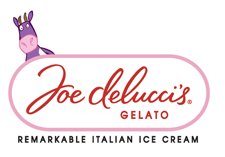
- Industry: Foodservice
- Headquarters: Gelato Manor, Harbury Lane, Leamington Spa, CV33 9SA, United Kingdom, Leamington Spa
- Products: Gelato, Ice cream, Sorbet
- Owner: Geldist Ltd.
- Website: www.joedeluccis.com

Joe Delucci's is a British frozen dessert company. The company supplies the British food service and hospitality sectors with high-end superior quality Italian gelato, (ice cream and sorbet). Joe Delucci's gelato is authentically manufactured in Italy, using no artificial colours, flavours or preservatives using only the finest ingredients. Following certified independent taste tests, 8 out of 10 people preferred Joe Delucci’s gelato for outstanding taste and superior quality.

The business is now entirely wholesale supply to trade clients, having also previously operated a small number of franchised and company owned branded outlets across the U.K.

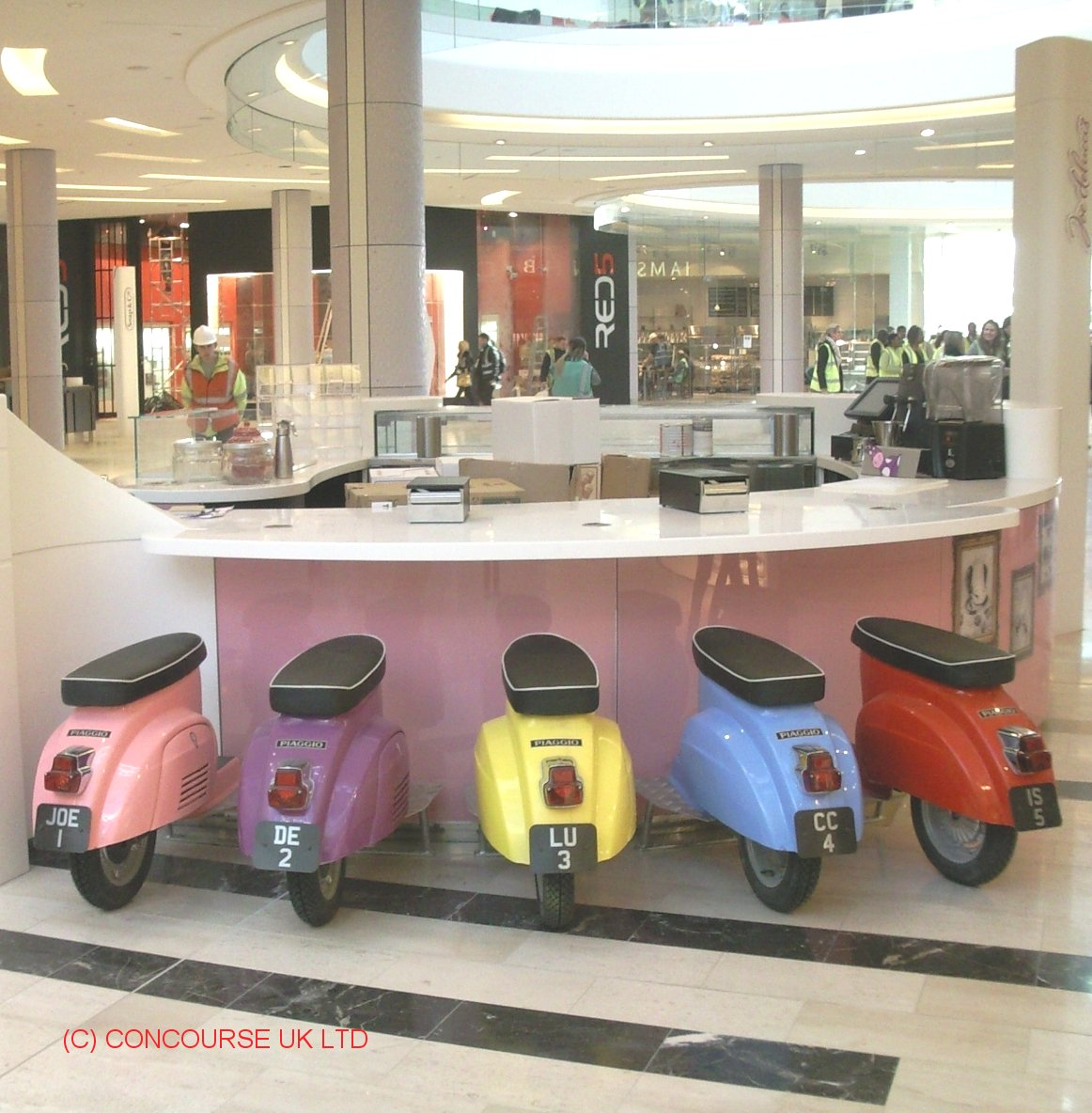
Joe Delucci's Piaggio Scooters

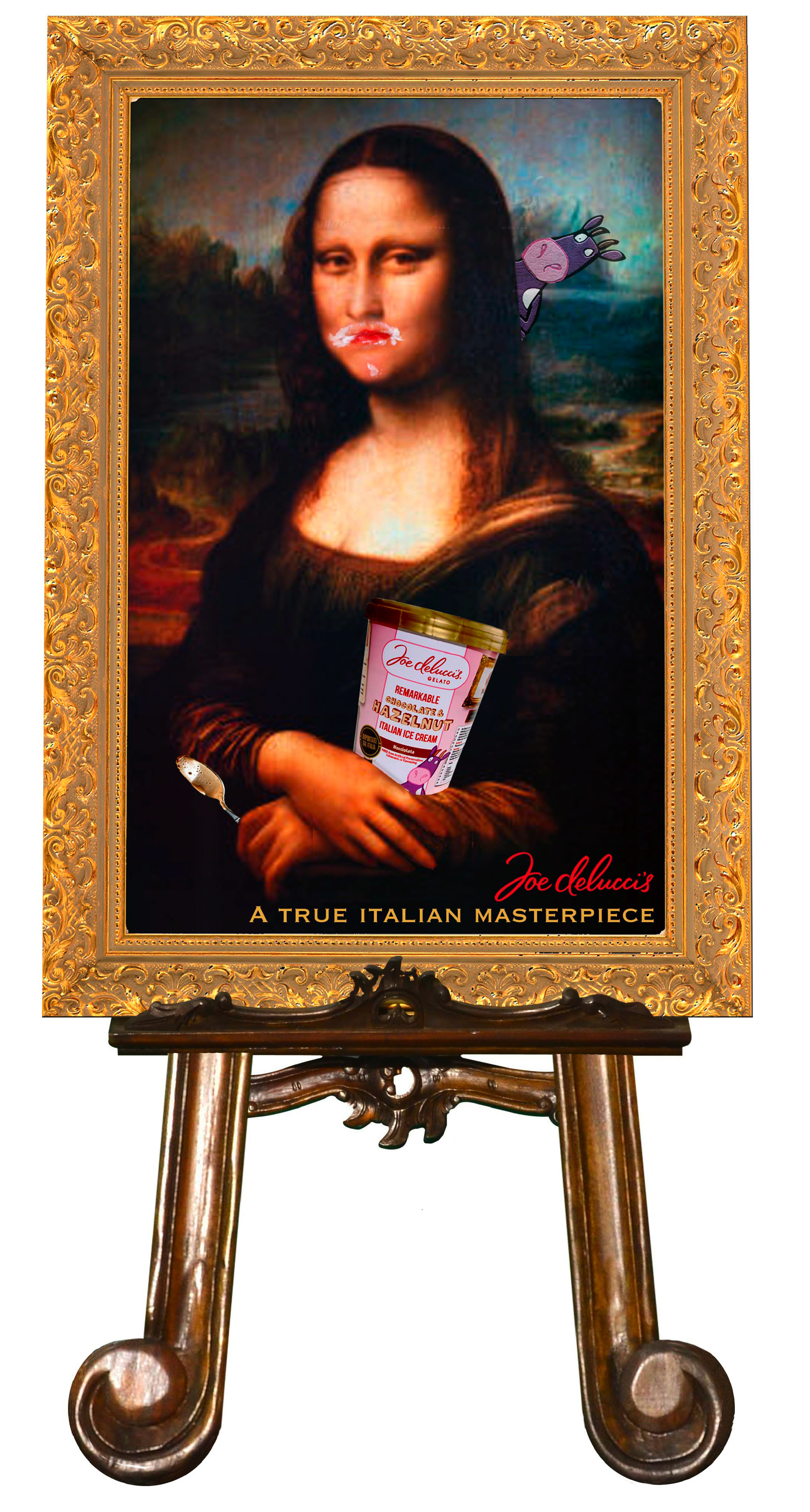
Joe Delucci's Master Piece

== Name ==
The name Joe Delucci was a fictional name. The rough translation means 'Joe of Light' and is a reference to the company's stated aim to change how consumers in the UK perceive ice cream by introducing them to more wholesome and lighter products such as gelati and sorbets.

== Awards ==
Awards won by the company include:

- Quality Food Awards 2014 - Ice Cream Winner: Tesco Finest Sicilian Mandarin Sorbetto
- Quality Food Awards 2014 - Ice Cream Highly Commended: Tesco Finest Sicilian Italian Hazelnut Gelato
- Quality Food Awards 2014 - Ice Cream Highly Commended: Tesco Finest Lombardy Mascarpone Gelato
- Great Taste Gold Awards 2012 - Strawberry Sorbet and Dulche de Leche (Caramel Toffee)
- Quality Food Awards 2011 – Short List - Joe Delucci’s Sicilian Pistachio Gelato
- Quality Food Awards 2010 - Highly Commended - Joe Delucci's Passionfruit Gelato
- IFEX 2008 - Winner of Best Grocery Product - New Products of the Show Awards
