= Anita Gelato =

Ice cream company

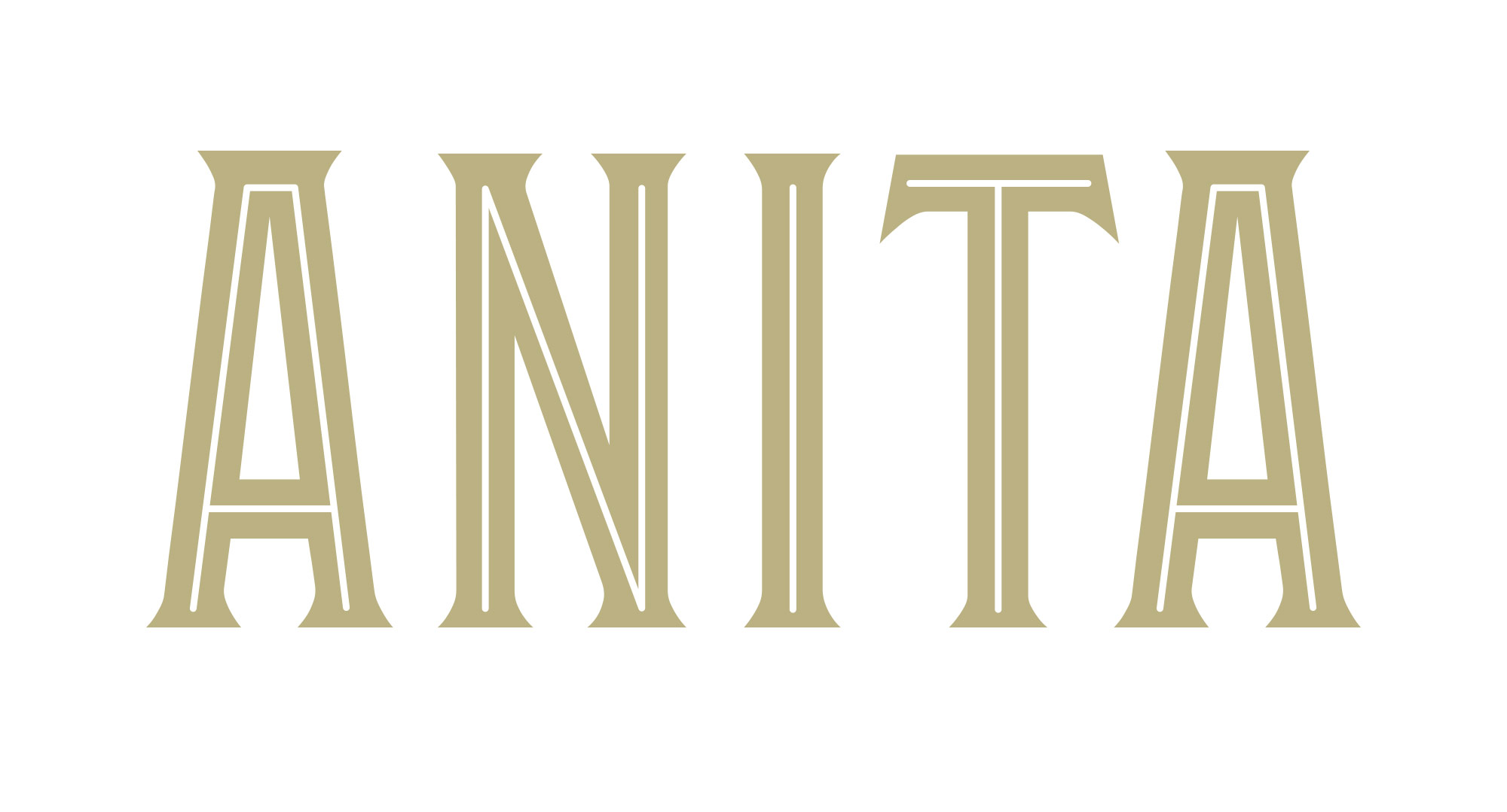
- Type: Subsidiary
- Industry: Retail
- Founded: 2002; Tel Aviv, Israel
- Founders: Nir Avital, Adi Avital
- Headquarters: Kfar Vitkin, Israel
- Number of locations: 160+
- Area served: Worldwide
- Products: Ice cream
- Owners: Avital family
- Website: www.anita-gelato.com

Anita la Mamma del Gelato (commonly known as Anita Gelato) is an Israeli ice cream company. It produces gelato, frozen yogurt, and sorbet, as well as ingredients for the ice cream industry.

The company was founded in 2002 in Tel Aviv, Israel, and has since expanded to over 160 locations in several countries, including Israel, the United States, Australia, New Zealand, the United Kingdom, Spain, Cyprus, and Puerto Rico.

== History ==
Anita Gelato is named after Anita Avital, the mother of the brand's co-founders, Nir and Adi Avital.

In the 1990s, Anita Avital and her son Nir began experimenting with ice cream flavours at home in Netanya, Israel. In 1998, Nir started selling their products from a cart at local food fairs.

In 2002, Adi Avital joined them and opened the first Anita Gelato shop in Neve Tzedek, Tel Aviv. In 2012, the company launched the Golda Glida sub-brand, which has since expanded across Israel.

A manufacturing facility was opened in Ra'anana in 2010. The brand expanded internationally in 2014, opening its first overseas shop in Sydney, Australia. Further locations followed in Spain, Cyprus, and Puerto Rico. In 2020, the first U.S. location opened in New York City, followed by shops in Los Angeles and Miami. In 2022, a location opened in London's West End.

== Operations and products ==
Anita Gelato produces more than 170 flavors, including some developed specifically for the brand.
