= Cream Stone =

Indian ice cream parlour chain

- Company type: Private
- Industry: Food and beverage
- Founded: 2004
- Headquarters: Hyderabad, India
- Number of locations: 16 cities across India
- Area served: India
- Products: Ice cream, milkshakes, diet desserts
- Subsidiaries: Temptations
- Website: www.creamstoneconcepts.com

Cream Stone is an Indian chain of ice cream parlours, established in 2004. The chain has stores in 16 locations across India. Cream Stone has received multiple food awards, presented by The Times Group and Zomato.

The chain offers a wide range of flavoured ice creams, incorporating flavours popular in India such as gulab jamun and lychee fruit. Cream Stone also offers diet options and milkshakes. Additionally, the company owns Temptations, established in 2004, which serves starters, chaat, and ice cream.
