= Whitey's Ice Cream =

Ice-cream parlor chain in Illinois, US

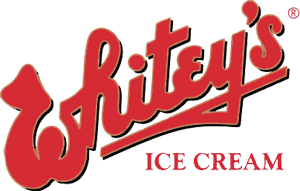
- Type: Private
- Industry: Ice cream parlor
- Founded: 1933; 93 years ago in Moline, Illinois, U.S.
- Founders: Chester "Whitey" Lindgren
- Headquarters: Moline, Illinois, U.S., U.S.
- Number of locations: 8 (2024)
- Area served: Illinois and Iowa
- Products: Ice cream, milkshakes, malts, and sundaes
- Owner: Jeff and Jon Tunberg
- Website: www.whiteysicecream.com

Whitey's Ice Cream is an ice cream parlor chain based in Moline, Illinois. This ice cream has been an icon of the Illinois and Iowa Quad Cities since it was founded in 1933.

== History ==
Chester Lindgren opened the first store on the corner of 16th Street and 23rd Avenue in Moline, Illinois. He was nicknamed "Whitey" due to his white-blonde colored hair. In 1935 Lindgren hired 15-year-old Bob Tunberg, who worked for him throughout high school and several years after. In 1953 Lindgren sold the store to Tunberg.

Tunberg and his wife, Norma, made ice cream during the day, and sold their product in the store at night. In 1979 the business was expanded when a second store opened in Moline, Illinois. After the success of this second store, as well as the addition of several more Illinois stores, the first Iowa store was opened in 1984 in Bettendorf, Iowa.

== Present ==
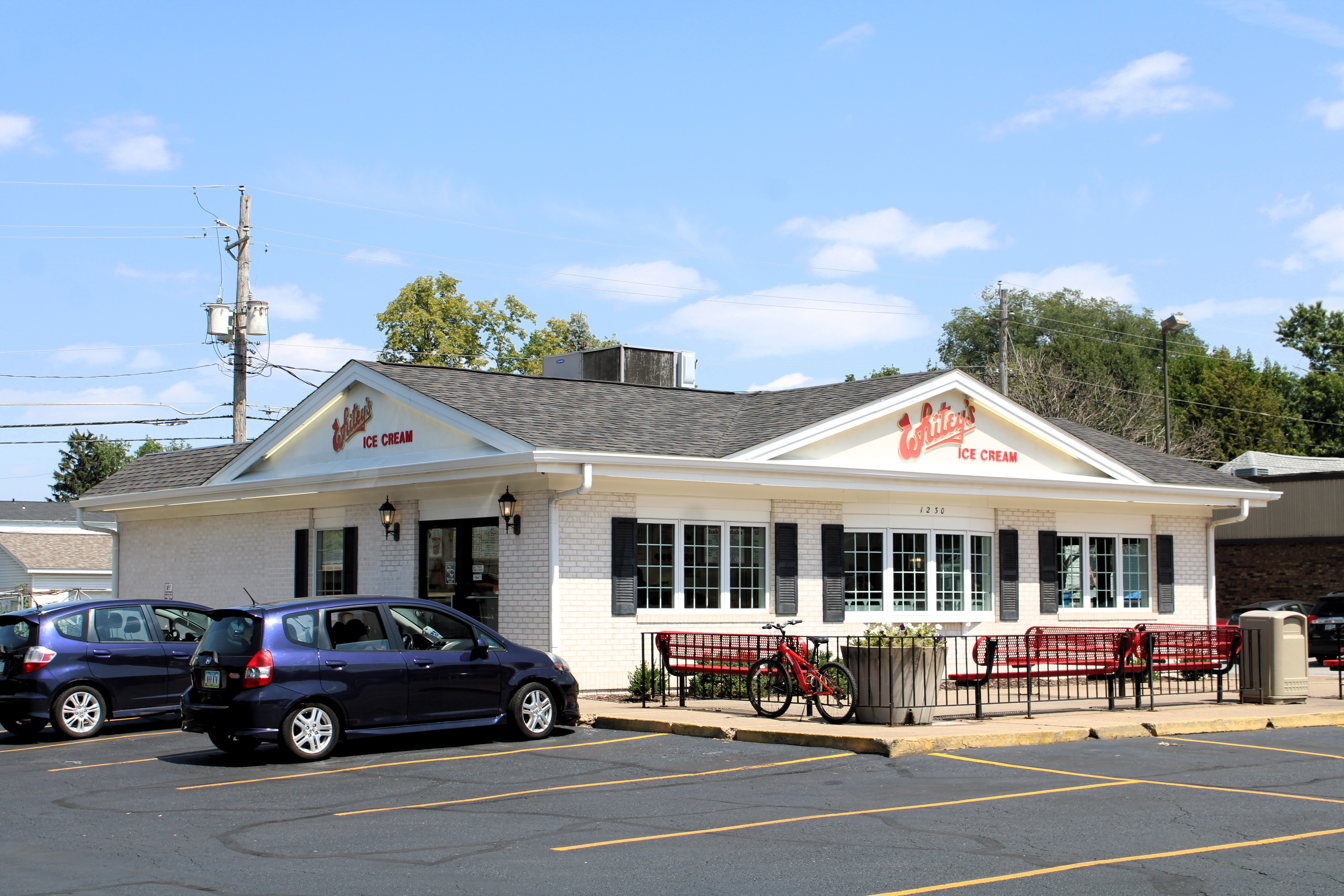
Whitey's Ice Cream on Locust Street in Davenport, Iowa

Whitey's Ice Cream is currently owned by Bob Tunberg's sons, Jeff and Jon Tunberg. They work side by side as co-owners of the company, and the title, president, remains open in honor of their late father, “The Quad-Cities Favorite Ice Cream Man”, who died in 1991. They currently operate nine locations in the Iowa and Illinois Quad Cities. They also maintain a retail stand at the Vibrant Arena at The MARK and Modern Woodmen Park during sporting events. Customers may also order the ice cream from Whitey's website, where it can be shipped anywhere in the continental United States.

In 1988, Whitey’s Ice Cream saw a dramatic change with the addition of a Wholesale Department and entrance into the grocery store market. This allowed Whitey’s Ice Cream packaged ice cream to be purchased from many more outlets. The Wholesale Department currently distributes to grocery stores and schools in a 100-mile radius of the Quad Cities, although, it can be purchased at Hy-Vee's as far away as Lincoln, Nebraska, which is approximately 362 miles away from the distribution center in Moline. It is also purchasable at Hy-Vee's in South Dakota, Minnesota, Wisconsin, Missouri, and Kansas in addition to Iowa and Illinois stores. Stores carrying Whitey’s Ice Cream include, Hy-Vee, Jewel, and Fareway.

On January 31, 2019, the location at Coral Ridge Mall in Coralville, Iowa closed down, marking the chain's exit from the Iowa City area. A previous store located in downtown Iowa City announced it was not reopening four year priors due to Whitey's unhappiness with renovations in the building they were leasing.

== Innovations ==
Whitey's Ice Cream is known for their extra thick shakes and malts, which can be held upside down. This is due to their innovation of high-powered malt machines and careful preparation by trained Whitey's employees. They also credit themselves with the creation of candy bar shakes and chocolate chip cookie dough ice cream. They also worked to develop a "No Sugar Added" ice cream sweetened with Splenda brand sweetener targeted toward diabetics.

One of Whitey’s newest flavors is Sgt. Camo, which is a camouflage-colored ice cream made from Graham cracker, marshmallow ice cream, and a ribbon of Whitey’s fudge. All profits from the sale of Sgt. Camo are donated to various military veterans groups. Sgt. Camo has been sent to the Pentagon, and also to military and their families before troops are deployed to Iraq and Afghanistan.

== Reception ==
Whitey's Ice Cream has been called the "Best in the Midwest" by readers of the Midwest Living Magazine. It has also been featured on the Food Network's Food Finds television show. In 2007 Whitey's Ice Cream was announced as the winner of the Fourth Annual Ice Cream Store of the Year Award known as THE PASSION AWARD given by the Ice Cream University. Whiteys was also voted number one ice cream in the nation by Travel Magazine in September 2014.
