= Maxibon =

Brand of ice cream sandwich made by Froneri

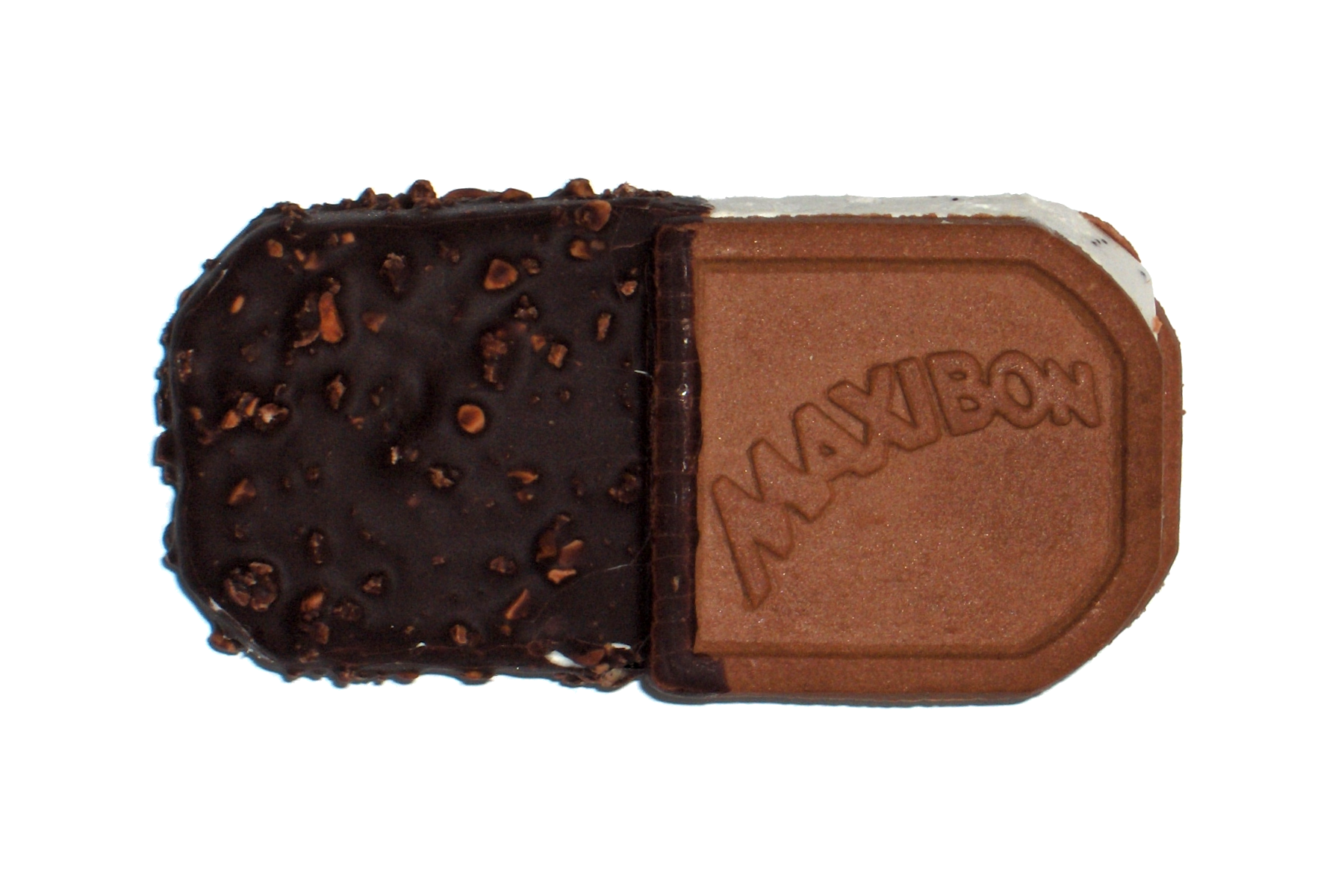
- Current owner: Froneri
- Country: Italy
- Markets: Worldwide
- Previous owners: Nestlé

Maxibon is a brand of ice cream sandwich made by Froneri, and also previously owned by the Swiss company Nestlé. It consists of a block of frozen dairy dessert containing small chocolate chips with one end covered in chocolate, and the other sandwiched between two biscuits.

== History ==
The Maxibon is an ice cream sandwich produced for the first time in Italy by Froneri in 1989 and then brought to international markets by Nestlé starting from 1993 when Nestlé acquired Italgel. Since 2016, the brand has been owned by Froneri, a joint venture between the English R&R Ice Cream and Nestlé itself.

The Maxibon bar is available in Europe, Canada, Australia, Chile, Egypt and New Zealand and can be purchased from 'Maxibon Zone' stands in European cities, such as Madrid. There are three available variations of Maxibon in Europe including vanilla, white chocolate and original flavour. There are also specials released from time to time, with unique flavors as well.

In 2022, Nestlé discontinued Maxibon in the UK.

== Varieties ==
There have been at least ten known varieties of Maxibon:

- Classic: (also called Vanilla) Made of vanilla ice cream with chocolate chips, with a half biscuit, half chocolate shell, together with hazelnuts and crumbs of biscuit.
- Honeycomb: A variant of the traditional Maxibon with honeycomb flavoured ice cream in place of vanilla.
- Caramel Rough Nut: the same shape as the original Maxibon, but with caramel ice cream instead of vanilla, and ripples of caramel sauce through the half of the ice cream that is encased in biscuit
- Monster Cookie: Cookies and cream flavoured ice cream with chocolate cookie bits, with half encased in the classic chocolate with crunchy cookie pieces and the other half sandwiched between two biscuits.
- Waffle: Vanilla ice cream with caramelised sugar pieces jammed between two honey-covered waffle biscuits on one side and dipped in caramel white choc with hazelnuts and cookie crumb on the other side.
- Peanut Butter and Jam: Peanut butter flavoured ice cream throughout with jam ripples in the biscuit section.
- Iced Coffee: Iced coffee flavoured ice cream with chocolate chips, with half encased in the classic chocolate and the other half sandwiched between two biscuits. Also sold as Maxi-Dare, made with Dare Iced Coffee.
- Cereal: With cereal and covered in white chocolate
- Mint: (also called That's Mint). Mint flavoured ice cream with chocolate chips between two traditional chocolate flavoured biscuits.
- Maxibon Stranger Things: White chocolate flavoured ice cream with two chocolate biscuits on one end and the other end dipped in red chocolate dye; promoting the Netflix series Stranger Things
- Maxibon Barney Banana: Banana flavoured ice cream with two chcolate biscuits on one end. The other end is dipped within the classic chocolate mixture. This variant was a limited time release, serving as a revival towards the popular Peters Ice Cream snack, Barney Banana.

=== Previous variants ===
- Cookie: Circular, with ice cream, chocolate chips and caramel sauce sandwiched between two chocolate chip 'cookies'.
- Snack: A half sized version of the original Maxibon, weighing 56g instead of the standard 102g.
- Risk: Regular size and shape however the flavour of ice cream, either vanilla, honeycomb or mint, was not known until the package was opened.
- Krispy Kreme: A collaboration with Krispy Kreme donuts with a flavour based on their original glazed doughnut. Available in Australia for a limited time.
- Pickle Rick Mint: Mint-flavoured ice cream with mint choc-chip ice cream, a limited-edition collaboration with the Rick and Morty cartoon in 2021.

== In popular culture ==
The Australian adventure game show Who Dares Wins, featured a segment called the "Maxibon Challenge". Usually involving Whitney who roams around in a mall finding strangers where if a contestant can manage to eat a Maxibon ice cream sandwich within 30 seconds. Then either he or she would be awarded AU$50.00 and be dubbed as a "Whitney Warrior" (an award named after its host Mike Whitney). The Maxibon featured in Pauline Hanson's YouTube cartoon series "Please Explain", Episode "Airbus Albo", where a parody of Australian Prime Minister Anthony Albanese exclaims that "Maxibons are two for $55!" (an exaggerated example of inflation).
