= Speelman's Ice Cream =

Manufacturer and distributor of ice cream

Speelman's Ice Cream was a manufacturer and distributor of ice cream and other frozen confections based in Cumberland, Maryland.

== History ==
The company was founded in 1850 by Rueben Taylor, who later sold it to his son-in-law Samuel Speelman. The business was sold to Carl A. Winfield, Sr in 1930.

Speelman's Ice Cream was primarily a wholesaler with distribution throughout western Maryland and surrounding areas in West Virginia and Pennsylvania. In addition to ice cream, Speelman's also sold frozen food between 1945-1955. The company also operated an ice cream parlor located in the front of the factory. The ice cream parlor closed in 1960.
