= Choctál =

US ice cream company

- Founded: 2007
- Headquarters: Pasadena, California
- Products: Pints, 4-oz Cups and Chocolate and Vanilla Tour Packs (4-4oz cups) of Single Origin Chocolate or Vanilla Ice Cream

Choctál LLC is a single-origin ice cream company that produces four varieties of chocolate and four varieties of vanilla in pints and 4-ounce single-serve cups. The 4-ounce cups are also packaged separately in Chocolate and Vanilla Tours (4 cups per package). Choctál is known for being the only single-origin ice cream company; each type of ice cream is made from a single variety of cacao or vanilla beans, creating more complex flavor than traditional ice cream. Single origin is a concept often found in coffee. Choctál is headquartered in Pasadena, California. The ice cream is produced in Cedarburg, Wisconsin, with no artificial additives, eggs, or gluten and rBST-free milk.

Choctál is a member of One Percent for the Planet.

== History ==
Choctál debuted at the Specialty Food Association's Winter Fancy Food Show 2007. The name Choctál is derived from the indigenous Aztec word Xocolatl, a sacred chocolate drink made from cacao.

Choctál's ownership changed in 2013 and the brand was relaunched at the Specialty Food Association's Winter Fancy Food Show in 2014. After four years in national distribution, the company announced its liquidation in December 2017.

== Origins ==
- Costa Rican Chocolate
- Ghana Chocolate
- Dominican Chocolate
- Kalimantan Chocolate
- Mexican Vanilla
- Papua New Guinea Vanilla
- Indonesian Vanilla
- Madagascar Vanilla

== Awards ==
In 2014, Choctál's Ghana Chocolate was named one of The Gourmet Retailer's Editor's Picks.

In 2015, Choctál's Kalimantan Chocolate was a finalist for a sofi Award in the "Ice Cream, Gelato, or Frozen Treats" category.

In 2016, Food & Wine named Choctál as one of their Top 10 Ice Creams and said, "Choctál focuses on two flavors, chocolate and vanilla, highlighting sustainable cacao and vanilla beans from different regions around the world."

== Reviews ==
San Jose Mercury News gave Choctál's Papua New Guinea Vanilla "4 Stars" and called it "perfection on a spoon" (2014). Choctál was featured in exclusive articles on Eat Something Sexy (2015), ForbesLife (2015) which called Choctál "the finest, most luscious and flavorful ice creams," and Pasadena Magazine (2015).

Sunset Magazine featured Choctál in July 2015 in an article entitled "Not Just Plain Vanilla"

Choctál's chocolate ice creams were mentioned by MarketWatch as one of "14 Valentine's Day chocolates better than a kiss" (2014).

Choctál was featured by The Wall Street Journal as one of America's best mail-order ice creams (2015).
