= Cauldron Ice Cream =

American ice cream parlor chain

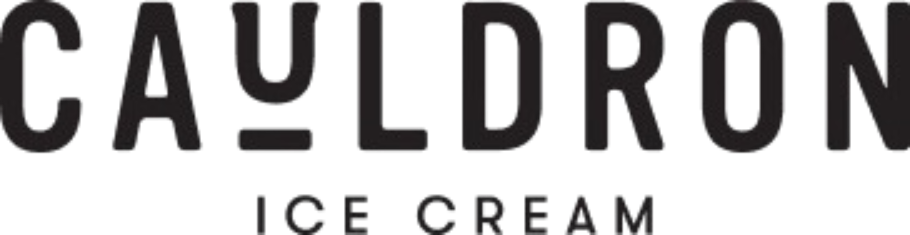

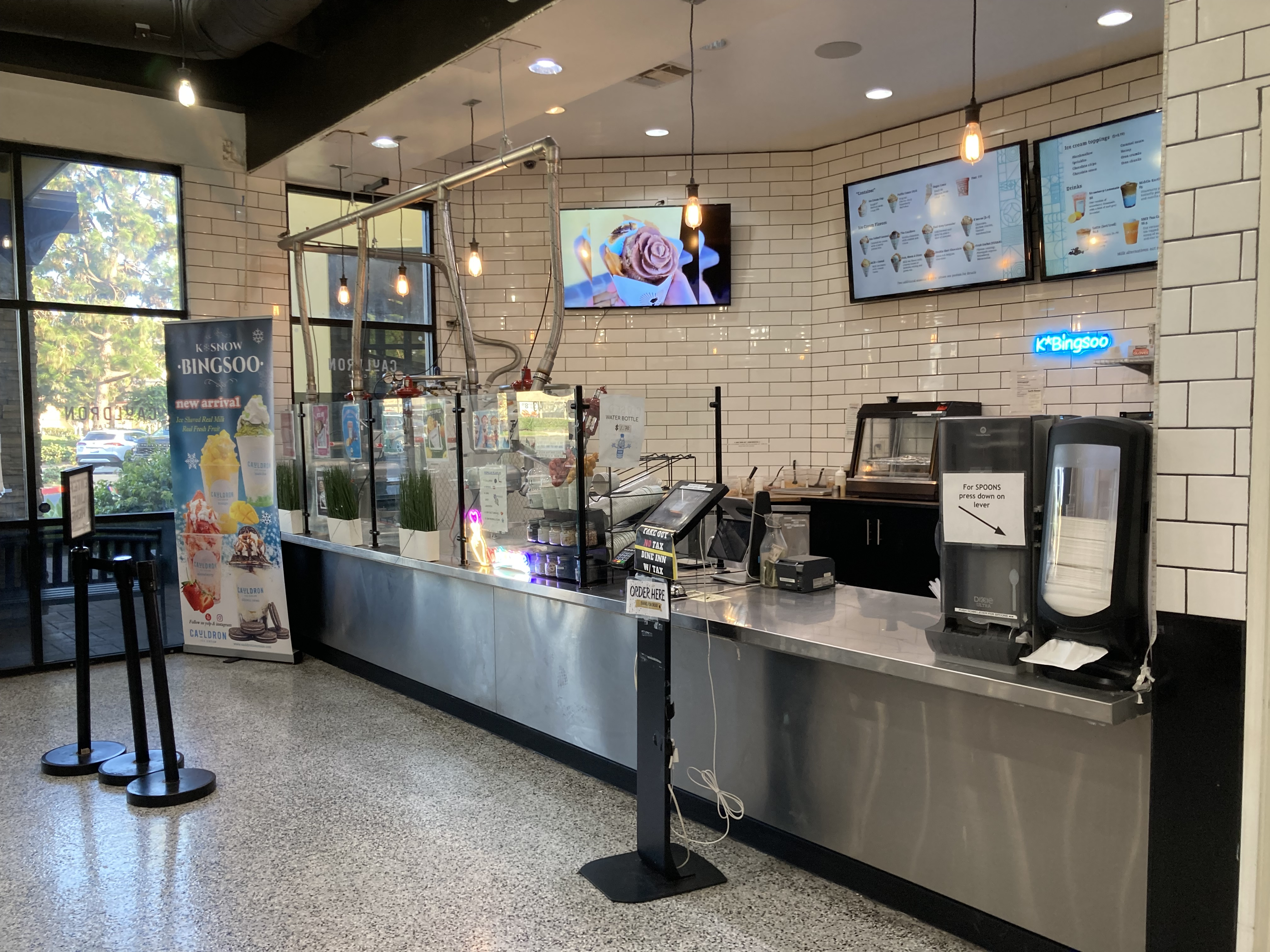
- Interior of the Santa Ana, California location
- Company type: Private
- Industry: Dessert
- Founded: May 2015
- Founder: Terence Lioe; Desiree Le
- Number of locations: 6 (2024)
- Area served: California; Texas
- Website: cauldronicecream.com

Cauldron Ice Cream is an American chain of ice cream parlors serving California and Texas. Founded in 2015, it is known for making its ice cream using liquid nitrogen.

== History ==
The chain was founded in May 2015, in Santa Ana, California, by the couple Terence Lioe and Desiree Le. Lioe had bought an ice cream machine for $16,000 in 2014, and wanted to open an ice cream shop with Le. They wanted to bring some flavors they had tasted in Singapore to the shop and experimented with the machine for six months. Its style of serving its ice cream, in egg waffles, started a trend amongst other, sometimes international, ice cream parlors. In 2017, it began franchising stores in the San Francisco Bay Area. It also started opening locations in Toronto in 2018, its first outside California. Locations in San Diego and Dallas were also conceived in that year. The Toronto parlor closed in 2020 due to the COVID-19 pandemic.

== Menu ==
Cauldron Ice Cream offers eight flavors of small-batch ice cream, which are rotated monthly. It also sells lattes, boba, and Middle Earth, a blend of boba, cream, and coffee. The ice cream is made using liquid nitrogen, speeding up the freezing process and creating a unique texture. The ice cream can be served as a rose instead of the typical scoop. It is also enveloped in an egg waffle, which the chain is also known for. The debut of this addition started a trend that carried over to many other dessert vendors, including ones in Canada, the United Kingdom, and Australia.

== Locations ==
As of 2024, Cauldron Ice Cream has six locations in California and Texas, with three in each state. In California, the chain has locations in Fremont, San Jose, and Santa Ana. Texas has parlors in Carrollton, Dallas, and Frisco.
