= Dewar's Candy Shop =

American ice cream shop

Dewar's Ice Cream and Fine Candies
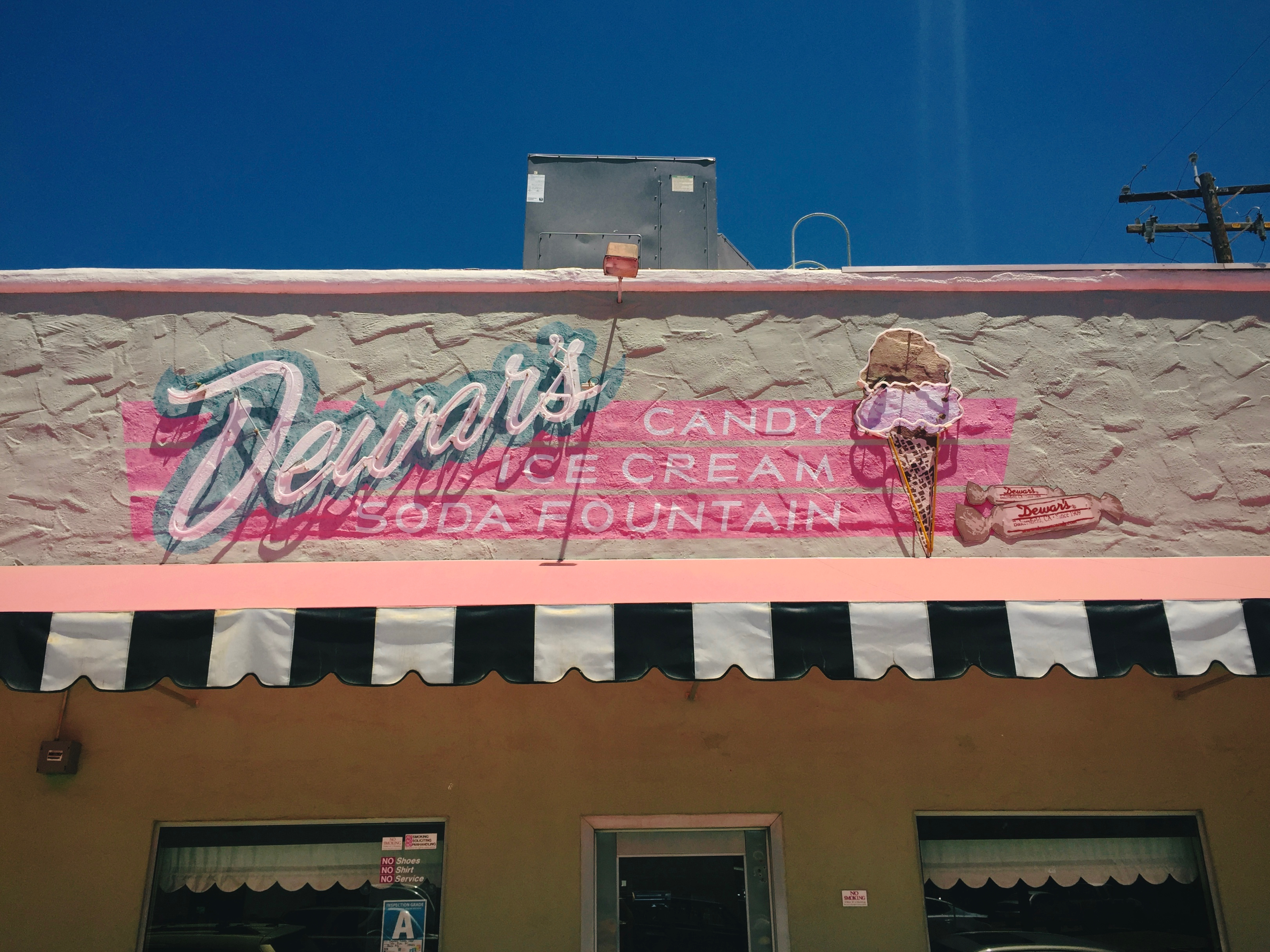
- Dewar's Candy Shop – 1120 Eye St.
- Trade name: Dewar's Candy Shop
- Industry: Restaurant
- Genre: ice cream parlor
- Founded: 1909; 117 years ago in Bakersfield, California, US
- Founders: James H. Dewar; George Dewar
- Headquarters: 1120 Eye St. Bakersfield, California, United States
- Number of locations: 3
- Website: dewarscandy.com

Dewar's Candy Shop is a family-operated ice cream parlor and candy shop in Bakersfield, California. Originally founded in 1909, it has occupied its location across from Bakersfield High School since 1930. The shop specializes in making ice cream, taffy chews, chocolates, and other products.

== History ==
James H. Dewar and his brother George Dewar, who were both from Kansas, founded the Chocolate Shop in 1909 which was located at 1665 Chester Avenue in Bakersfield, California. At the shop, they created the popular peanut butter taffy, and in 1911, added the peppermint version of the taffies. James, who bought George's part of the business, eventually moved the shop to 948 Baker Street. In 1928, the family moved to Ventura, California for a small period of time and started another shop there. They later moved back to Bakersfield and received an offer to help build the current location at 1120 Eye Street in 1930. Around this time James Dewar started creating and distributing ice cream at his shop. In 1947, James' son, James A. Dewar, took over the shop with his brother Joe Dewar.

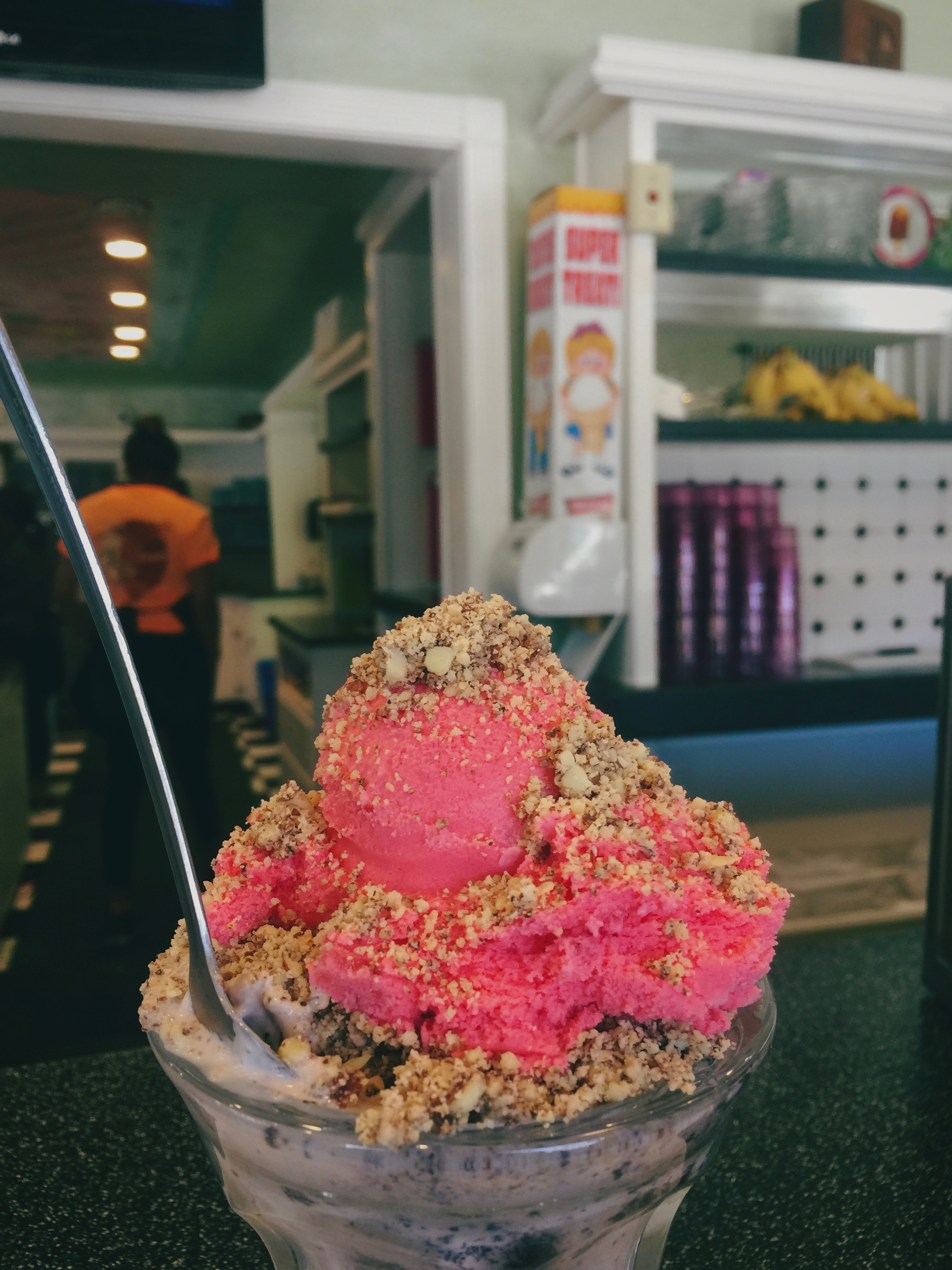
A bowl of Dewar's Ice Cream

In 1977, James A. Dewar's son, George, took over the shop. George's son, Michael, started working in the business by overseeing the manufacturing of the Dewar's taffies, and George's daughter, Heather Dewar Cook now runs day-to-day operations, alongside her father George and brother Michael..

=== Enlargement of the business ===
The family opened a new Dewar's location at 9530 Hageman Road, spearheaded by Heather, but it was eventually closed in 2011 to make way for a new location at 2700 Calloway Drive. 2012 saw the opening of the Dewar's Express, a drive-through version of Dewar's Ice Cream. In 2019, another flavor of Dewar's taffies, Almond Butter, was released. As of 2019, there are 23 flavors of ice cream served including English Toffee, maple nut, and peanut butter fudge,

Since the 2010s, Dewar's hosts the "Cupid's Challenge", an annual fundraiser for the Mendiburu Magic Foundation, a local charity.

== Recognition ==
As of 2005, Dewar's ice cream was sold at the Disney's Soda Fountain and Studio Store in Hollywood. Food critic Jonathan Gold said in 2011 that

"Dewar's is the best old soda fountain in the state, and even if it didn't make the world's best nut chews... I would still go there for the thrill of seeing the counterwoman tamping the ice cream into sundae goblets in a way that makes the marshmallow crème spurt out the sides."

Dewar's Candy Shop and their taffy chews have been featured on the Food Network, as well as in the "Highly Recommend" column of Bon Appetit. At the shop, a letter framed on the wall from football player Frank Gifford reads in one section, "I love my peanut butter chews."
