= Bonnie Doon Ice Cream =

American ice cream brand

Bonnie Doon Ice Cream was an American ice cream brand established in 1938 in the U.S. state of Indiana by three brothers by the last name of Muldoon. The brothers held a contest in the South Bend Tribune newspaper in 1937 to name the restaurant. The Muldoon family later named a daughter after the business, Bonnie Muldoon Witt. Bonnie Doon had many restaurants in the area, that had indoor dining as well as a car drive in and orders were taken over a speaker and delivered by a "car hop". One very popular flavor was Mint Chocolate Chip; they also sold a hamburger called the Bonnie Burger. The restaurants were quite popular and successful. The company was sold in 1990. One restaurant remains in business in Mishawaka.

Owner is Adam Carroll.

Bonnie Doon ice cream was made at a plant in Elkhart, Indiana and was sold at namesake carhop diners in Indiana and Michigan. The plant closed at the end of 2013. The remaining diner location has since used Valpo Velvet ice cream made in nearby Valparaiso.

Bonnie Doon drive-in locations have included:

- South Bend, Indiana: Lincolnway West, on the SE corner of Lincolnway West and Bendix Drive
- South Bend, Indiana: 52446 SR 933 north of Roseland
- South Bend, Indiana: 1600 block of South Michigan Street
- Mishawaka, Indiana: 109 E 4th Street
- Mishawaka, Indiana: 2704 Lincolnway West (as of 2021 the only remaining location)
