= List of restaurant chains in India =

The following is a list of notable restaurant chains in India, including fast food and casual dining restaurant chains.

== Fast food ==
=== Indian ===
- Adyar Anandha Bhavan – Indian vegetarian restaurant chain Restaurants, Snacks and Sweets
- Barista Lavazza – Indian coffee drink company
- Bikanervala – Indian food production company
- Burgs – Indian fast food chain
- Café Coffee Day – Coffeehouse chain
- California Burrito (India) – Indian fast casual restaurant chain
- Chai Point – Indian tea company and cafe chain
- Dindigul Thalappakatti Restaurant – Indian restaurant chain
- Darshini – Indian type of self-service restaurant
- Dosa plaza – Indian fast food restaurant chain
- Drunken Monkey – Smoothie bar chain in India
- Faasos – Indian "food on demand" service
- Flurys – Tea room and pastry shop in Kolkata, India
- Goli Vada Pav – Indian fast food restaurant chain
- Haldiram's – Vegetarian Indian restaurant and foodstuff manufacturer
- Indian Coffee House – Restaurant chain in India, run by co-operative societies
- Jumbo King – Indian fast-food restaurant chain
- K.C. Das Grandsons – Indian confectionery
- Karachi Bakery – Indian bakery retail company
- Kwality Wall's – Indian food company
- Mavalli Tiffin Room – Indian restaurant and catering company
- Monginis – Indian bakery chain
- Nirula's – Indian fast food restaurant chain
- Natural Ice Cream – Indian ice cream brand
- Parsa's – Indian fast food chain
- Pizza Corner – International franchise of pizzeria chains
- Rebel Foods – Indian cloud kitchen company
- Ratna Cafe – Indian fast food restaurant chain
- Saravana Bhavan – Restaurant chain
- Smokin' Joe's – Indian pizzeria chain
- Wow! Momo – Indian quick-service restaurant

=== International ===
- The Chocolate Room (cafe) – Australian chocolate cafe chain
- Au Bon Pain – American bakery and cafe chain
- Auntie Anne's – U.S. restaurant chain
- Baskin-Robbins – US international ice cream parlor chain
- Burger King – American fast food restaurant chain
- Carl's Jr. – American multinational fast food chain
- Cinnabon – American baked goods store chain
- Costa Coffee – British coffeehouse company
- Ichibanya – Japanese food services company
- IHOP – American restaurant chain
- Domino's Pizza – American multinational pizza restaurant chain
- Dunkin' Donuts – American multinational food company
- Johnny Rockets – American restaurant chain
- KFC – American fast food restaurant chain
- Krispy Kreme – US-based doughnut company and coffeehouse chain
- McDonald's – American multinational fast-food chain
- Papa John's – American pizza restaurant chain
- Pita Pit – Canadian restaurant franchise
- Pizza Hut – American multinational restaurant chain
- PizzaExpress – British restaurant group
- Popeyes – American multinational fast food chain
- Quiznos – American fast food chain
- Sal's Pizza – Pizzeria chain in New England
- Sbarro – American pizzeria chain
- Starbucks Coffee – Joint venture company
- Subway – American fast food chain
- Taco Bell – American fast-food chain
- Tim Hortons – Canadian multinational coffeehouse and restaurant chain
- Wendy's – American international fast food chain
- Wetzel's Pretzels – American restaurant chain

== Casual dining ==
=== Indian ===
- 6 Ballygunge Place
- Aminia – Restaurant chain in West Bengal(Kolkata), India
- Anjappar Chettinad Restaurant – Restaurants in India
- Dindigul Thalappakatti Restaurant – Restaurant chain in Tamil Nadu, India
- Karim's – International restaurant chain headquartered in Delhi, India
- Mainland China – Chinese restaurant chain
- Mainland China Asia Kitchen – Indian restaurant company
- Moshe's
- Moti Mahal Delux – Historic restaurant
- Oh! Calcutta – Indian restaurant company
- Subbayya Gari Hotel – Indian vegetarian restaurant chain

=== International ===
- California Pizza Kitchen – American restaurant chain
- Chili's – Casual dining restaurant chain
- Hard Rock Cafe – International restaurant chain
- Nando's – South African flame-grilled chicken chain
- Ruby Tuesday – American multinational foodservice retailer
- TGI Fridays – American restaurant chain
- Yauatcha – Chinese restaurant in London, England
