= Culture of Dhaka =

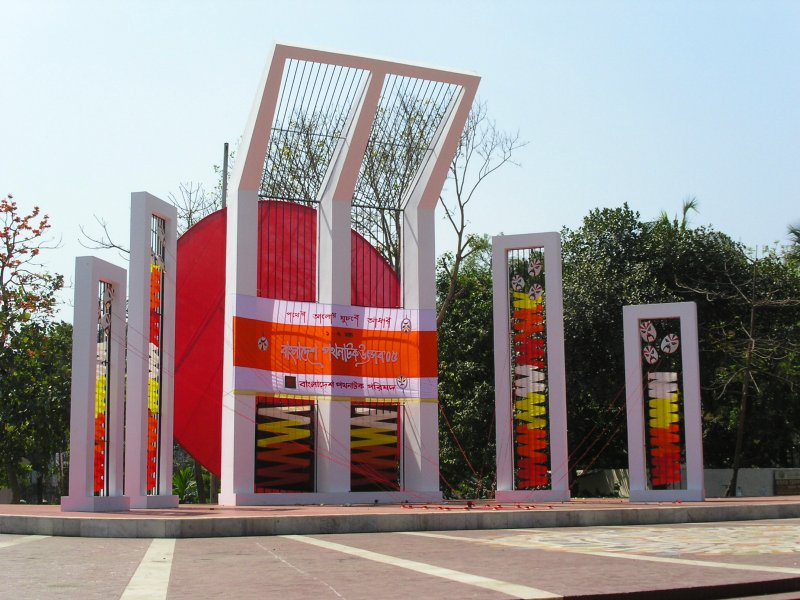
Shaheed Minar symbolises the Bengali language movement

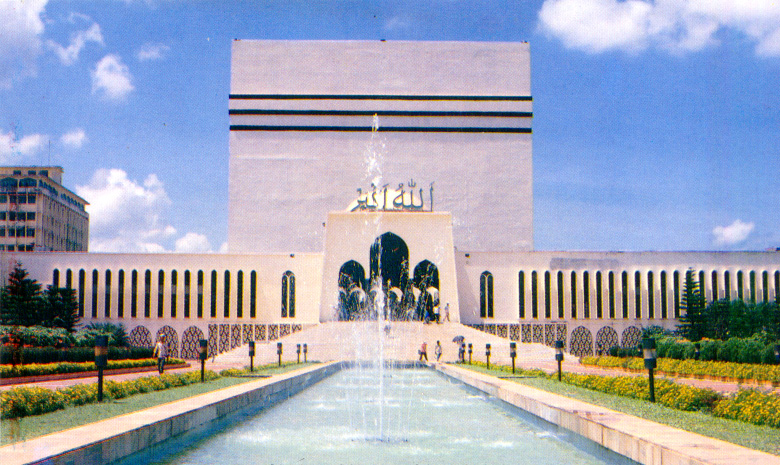
Baitul Mukarram, the national mosque of Bangladesh

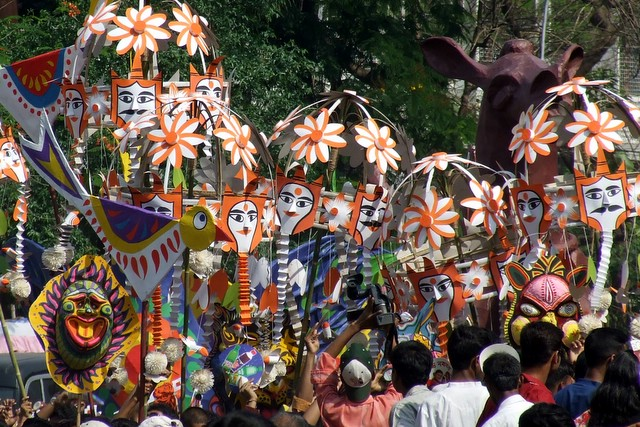
Boishakhi Shobhajatra

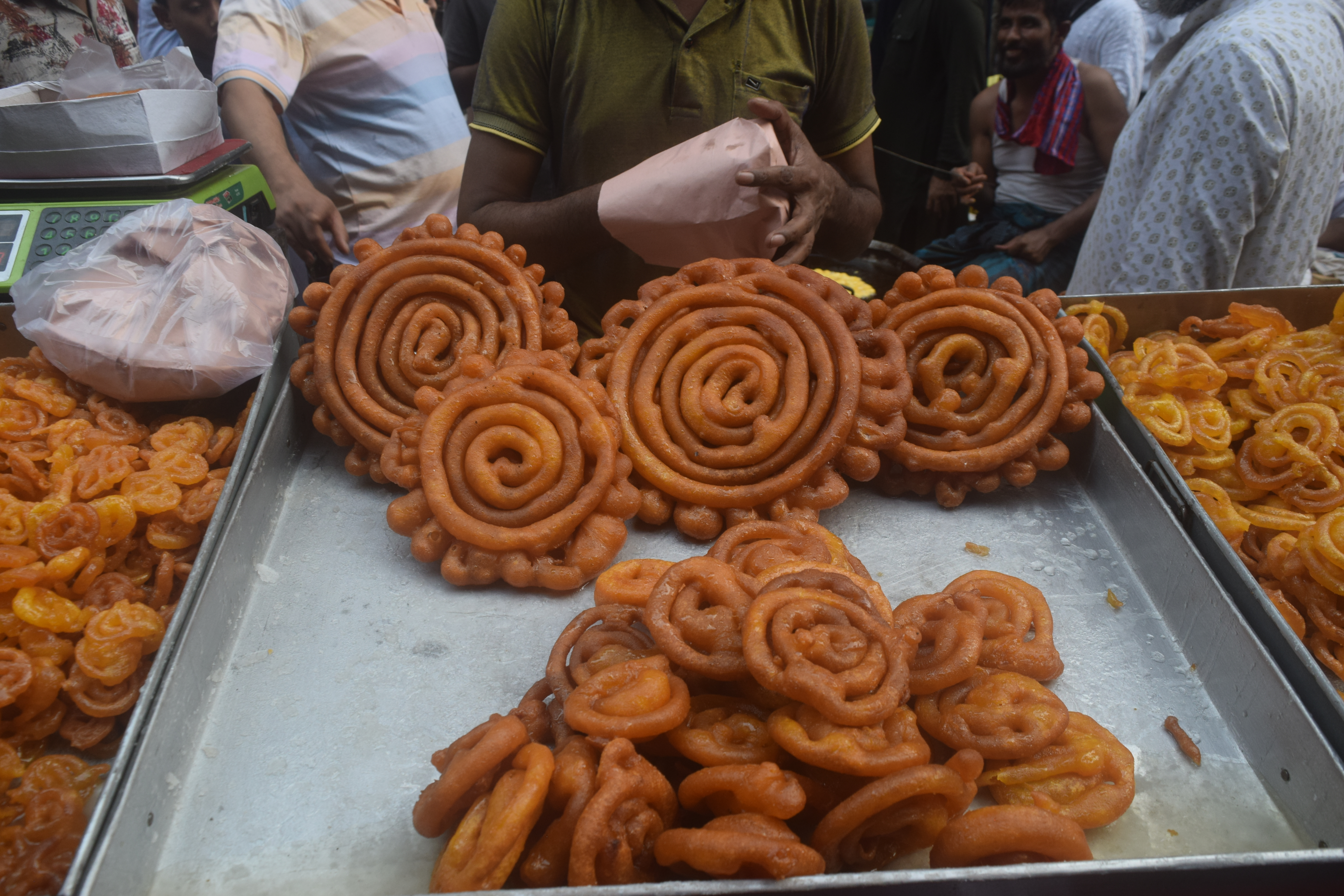
Shahi jilapi in Chawkbazar Iftar Market

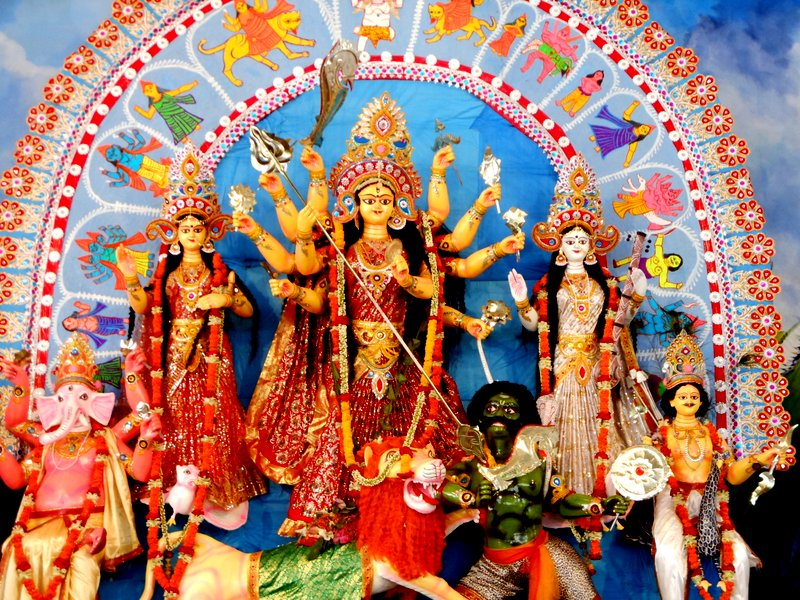
Durga Puja, main religious festival of Bangladeshi Hindus

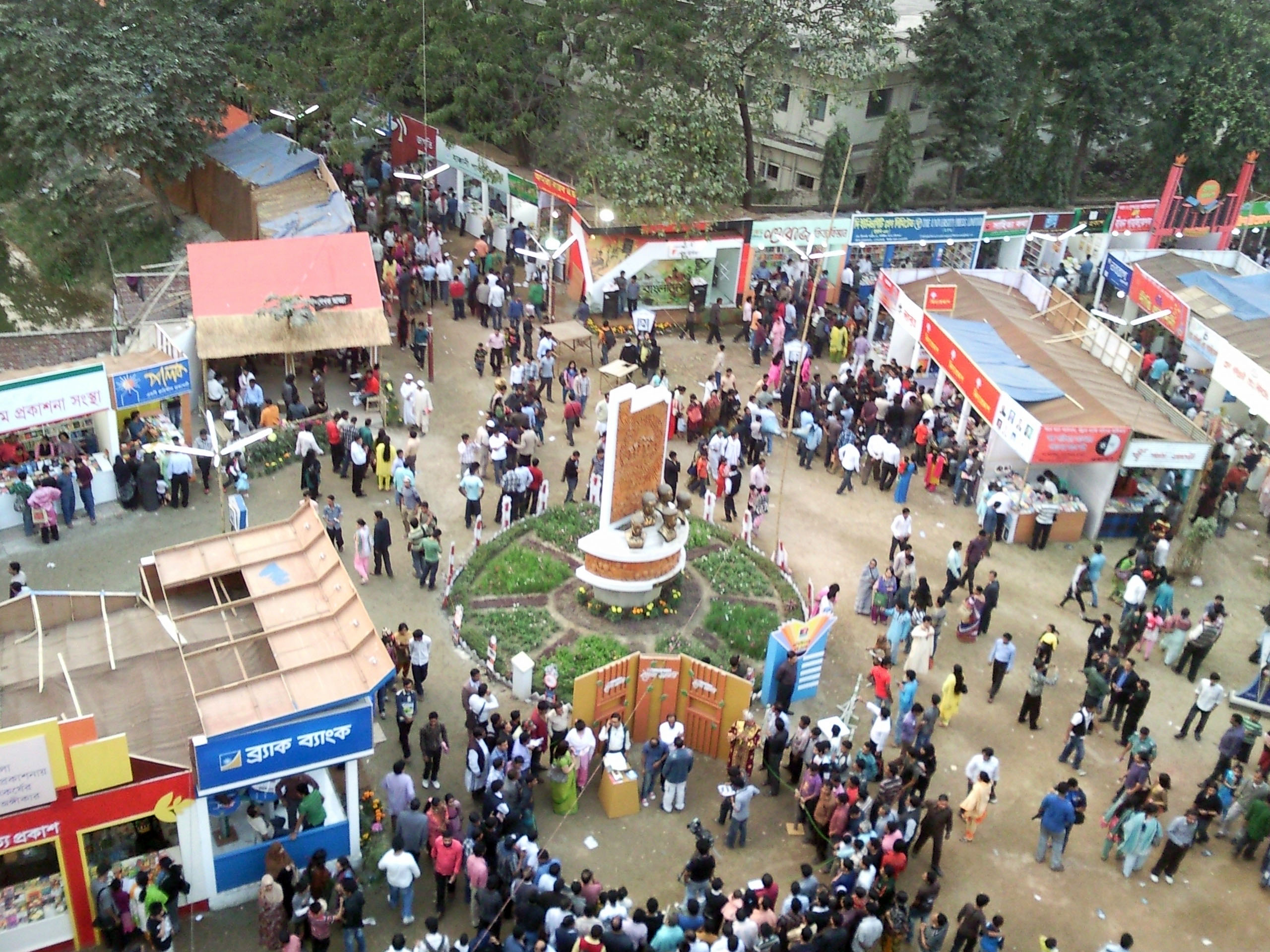
Ekushey Book Fair

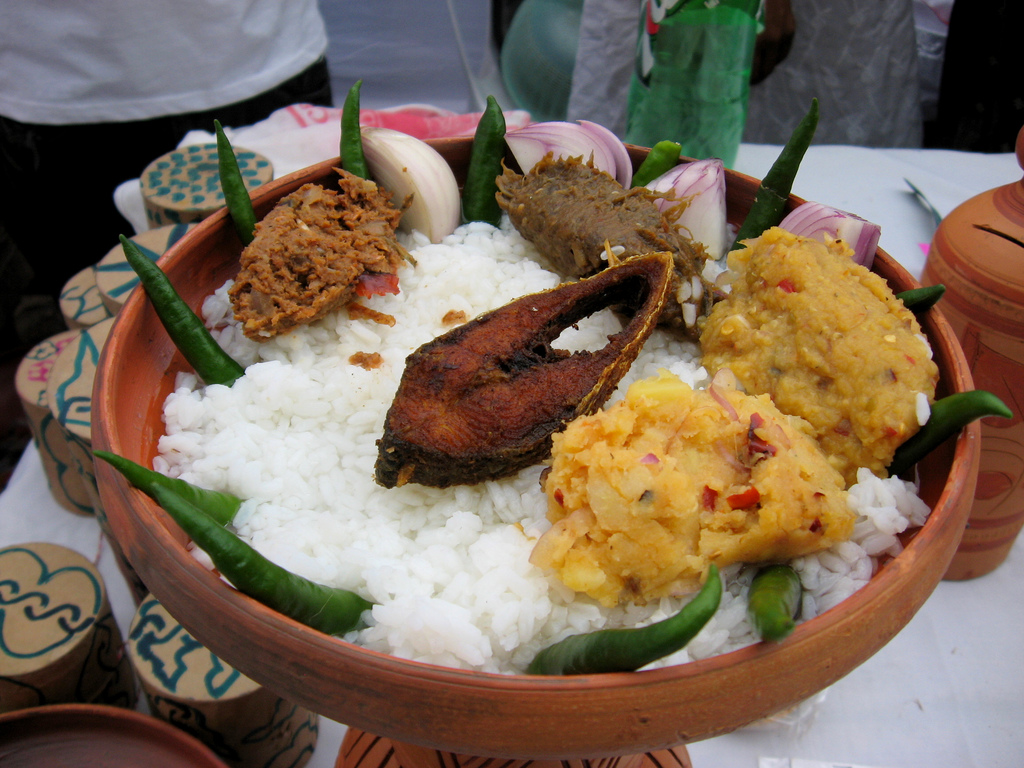
Panta Ilish – a traditional platter of Panta bhat, with fried ilish slice

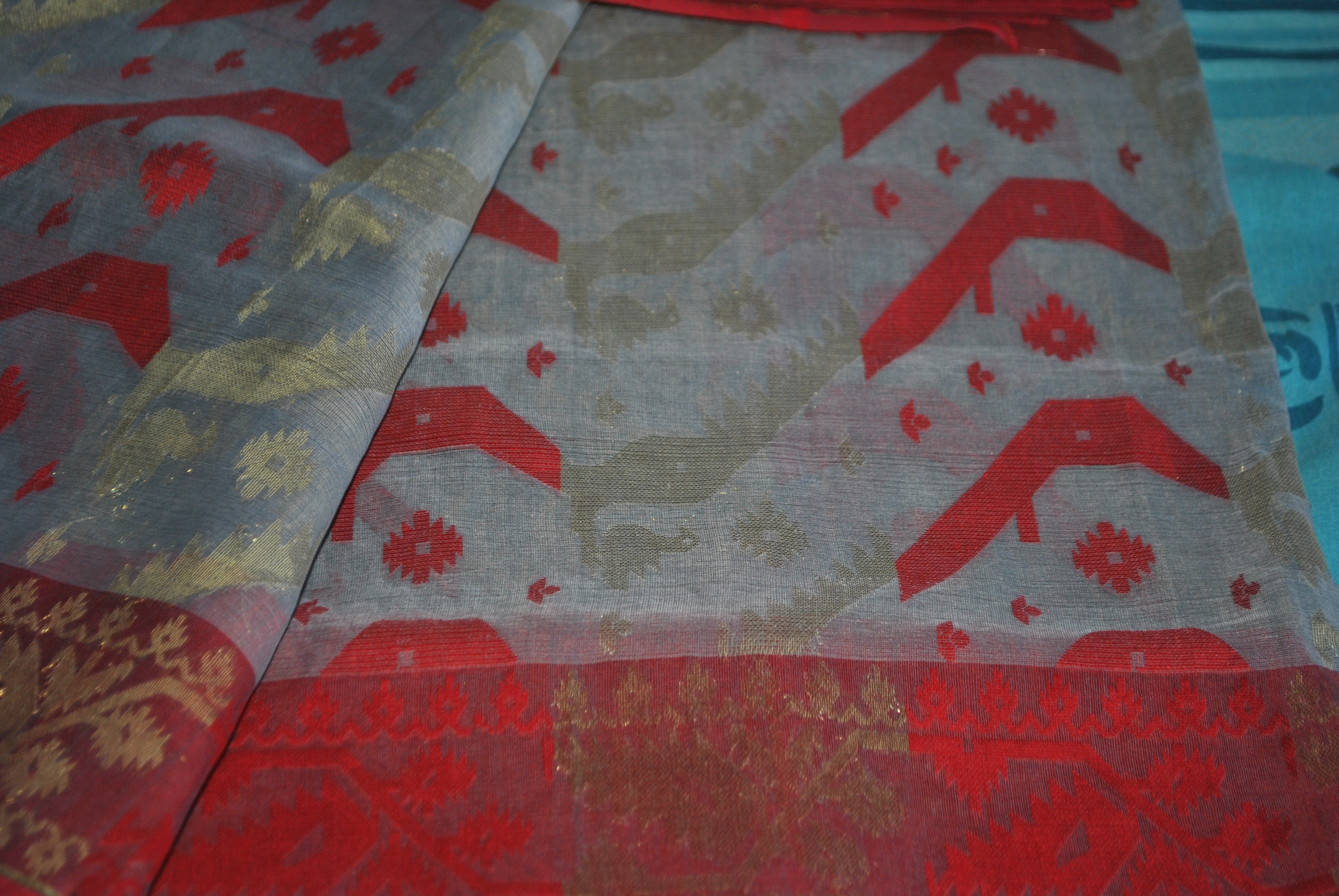
Islamic motifs of Jamdani weaved on Muslin

Dhaka is the capital and the most populous city of Bangladesh and is characterised by its busy urban life and a variety of cultural experiences, including festivals, cuisine, entertainment, shopping, and sites of interest. The nature of these activities mirrors the secular character of the city's population. Important holidays include Language Movement Day, Independence Day, Victory Day, and Pohela Boishakh. Religious festivals include Eid al-Fitr, Eid al-Adha, Durga Puja, Buddha Purnima, Christmas etc. The culture of Dhaka is based on the culture of Bengal.

== Festivals ==
Dhaka's annual cultural events, festivals, and celebrations are Independence Day (26 March), the International Mother language Day (21 February), Victory Day, Pohela Boishakh, Ekushey Book Fair, Dhaka Art Summit, Rabindra Joyonti, and Nazrul Joyonti; the Hindu festivals including the Durga Puja, Janmashtami, and Rathayatra; the Muslim festivals of Eid ul-Fitr, Eid ul-Adha, Milad-un-Nabi, Shab-e-Baraat, and Muharram; the Buddhist festival of Buddha Purnima, and the Christian festival of Christmas.

Many of Dhaka's artworks and museums, as well as public ceremonies and rallies, serve to commemorate the war crimes committed by Pakistan and It's collaborators against the Bangladeshi people. People congregate at the Shaheed Minar and the Jatiyo Smriti Soudho to remember the national heroes of the Bengali language movement and the Bangladesh Liberation War. Many schools and colleges organize fairs, festivals, and concerts, in which citizens from all levels of society participate.

Pohela Boishakh, the Bengali New Year, falls annually on 14 April, marking the first day of the harvest season, and is popularly celebrated across the country. Usually on Pohela Boishakh, homes are thoroughly cleaned and people wake up early, they wear new and elaborate clothes for this occasion. It is customary to visit relatives, friends, and neighbors and attend local fairs. Fairs are arranged in many parts of the country where various agricultural products, traditional handicrafts, toys, cosmetics, as well as various kinds of food and sweets are sold. The fairs also provide entertainment, with singers, dancers and traditional plays and songs. Horse races, bull races, bullfights, cockfights, flying pigeons, and boat racing were also popular. In Dhaka, large crowds of people gather on the streets of Shahbag, Ramna Park, and the campus of the University of Dhaka for celebrations.

Other festivities include the Bengali Spring Festival, Nazrul Joyonti, the birthday of Kazi Nazrul Islam, Rabindra Jayanti, the birthday of Rabindranath Tagore, Hay Festival Dhaka, and Bengal-ITC SRA Classical Music Festival. The students of the University of Dhaka also celebrate Basanta Utsav during spring at Pohela Falgun with a vibrant procession that begins at the Fine Arts Faculty, travels to the TSC, and returns to the Fine Arts Faculty.

== Performing arts and media ==
Despite the growing popularity of modern music groups and rock bands, traditional folk music remains popular. The works of the national poet Kazi Nazrul Islam and national anthem writer Rabindranath Tagore have a widespread following across Dhaka. The Baily Road area, known as Natok Para (Theater Neighborhood), is the center of Dhaka's theater movement.

Bangladesh Betar is the state-run primary provider of radio services and broadcasts a variety of programs in Bengali and English. In recent years, many private radio networks, especially FM radio services, have been established in the city, such as Radio Foorti FM 88.0, Radio Today FM 89.6, Radio Amar FM 88.4, ABC Radio FM 89.2, DHAKA FM 90.4, etc. Bangladesh Television is the state-run broadcasting network, providing a wide variety of programs in Bengali and English since its establishment on 25 December 1964. It has two TV channels: BTV and BTV World. BTV telecasts via terrestrial and satellite networks. while BTV World telecasts via satellite only. Sangsad Bangladesh Television is another state-run TV channel, which was launched on 25 January 2011, and broadcasts the parliamentary activities of Bangladesh. Cable and satellite TV networks, such as Ekushey Television, Channel I, ATN Bangla, Desh TV, RTV, NTV, Banglavision, Channel 9 Bangladesh, and Independent TV, are amongst the most popular channels.

The main offices of most publishing houses in Bangladesh are based in Dhaka. The Prothom Alo and The Daily Ittefaq are the most popular amongst the large number of Bengali language daily newspapers, periodicals, and other publications in the city. The Daily Star and The Independent are among the English-language daily newspapers published.

Fixed-line tele-density in Bangladesh is less than 1%. Mobile penetration is 82 telephone subscriptions per 100 inhabitants.

Dhaka is home to Dhaka Art Summit and Dhaka World Music Festival.

== Media and cinema ==
The Bangladeshi press is diverse, outspoken, and privately owned. Over 200 newspapers are published in the country. Bangladesh Betar is the state-run radio service. The British Broadcasting Corporation operates the popular BBC Bangla news and current affairs service. Bengali broadcasts from Voice of America are also very popular. Bangladesh Television (BTV) is the state-owned television network. There are more than 20 privately owned television networks, including several news channels. Freedom of the media remains a major concern due to government attempts at censorship and harassment of journalists.

The cinema of Bangladesh dates back to 1898, when films began screening at the Crown Theatre in Dhaka. The first bioscope in the subcontinent was established in Dhaka that year. The Dhaka Nawab Family patronized the production of several silent films in the 1920s and 30s. In 1931, the East Bengal Cinematograph Society released the first full-length feature film in Bangladesh, titled The Last Kiss. The first feature film in East Pakistan, Mukh O Mukhosh, was released in 1956. During the 1960s, 25–30 films were produced annually in Dhaka. By the 2000s, Bangladesh produced 80–100 films a year. While the Bangladeshi film industry has achieved limited commercial success, the country has produced notable independent film makers. Zahir Raihan was a prominent documentary-maker until his assassination in 1971. Tareque Masud (1956–2011) is regarded as one of Bangladesh's outstanding directors due to his numerous productions on historical and social issues. Masud was honored by FIPRESCI at the Cannes Film Festival in 2002 for his film The Clay Bird. Other prominent directors of Bangladesh cinema include Tanvir Mokammel, Mostofa Sarwar Farooki, Humayun Ahmed, Alamgir Kabir, and Chashi Nazrul Islam.

== Cuisine ==
In Dhaka, meals consumed at home generally include rice as a staple with fish, meat, or vegetable curries as a side. Dal (a lentil soup) is a common accompaniment. Rice can be replaced by roti or porota. Most restaurant cuisines in Dhaka are different from these meals. Kachchi biryani, chicken biryani, tehari, polao, and khichuri are the most common courses in restaurants. For snacks, mughlai porota, halim, shingara, and samosa are common. Borhani and lacchhi are amongst the most popular drinks. Street carts in parks offer snacks like chotpoti, jhalmuri, and fuchka.

Some restaurants are famous for their specialized recipes and culinary experience. These include Nannar Biryani, Haji Biryani, Mutton Glassey, and Laban, found in Old Dhaka. Other specialties of Dhaka's cuisine include jali kabab, reshmi kabab, shuti kabab, shik kabab, gurda kabab, khiri kabab, reshmi jilapi, shahi jilapi, rumali ruti, tandoor ruti, naan, bakorkhani, ilish polao, and morog polao.

People of the city consume a varied diet. In addition to the popular Bangladeshi cuisine and South Asian variants, a large variety of international cuisine is available in Dhaka. There are restaurants specializing in Chinese, Thai, Japanese, Mexican, Italian, and other cuisines. Local and international fast food shops and chains serve burgers, fries and other readily available foods. Often, many restaurants will customize foreign cuisine to meet the taste of local people. For instance, most Chinese restaurants in Dhaka use recipes different from authentic Chinese food.

The following international foreign-owned restaurant chains are currently operating in the country:

- A&W
- Baba Rafi
- Barista Lavazza
- Baskin Robbins
- Bbq
- Burger King
- Butler's Chocolate Cafe
- Chatime
- Ci Gusta!
- Coffee World
- Cold Stone Creamery
- Cookie Man
- Cream & Fudge Factory
- Crimson Cup Coffee & Tea
- Dipsydo's
- Fish & Co
- Gloria Jean's Coffee
- Johnny Rocket's
- Kenny Rogers Roasters
- KFC
- Krispy Kreme
- Mainland China
- Manhattan Fish Market
- Mövenpick
- Nando's
- New Zealand Natural
- Papparoti
- Pizza Hut
- Pizza Inn
- Pizza Roma
- Popeyes
- Sbarro
- Starbucks
- Subway
- Second Cup Coffee
- Sigree
- Suzuki Coffee
- The Coffee Bean & Tea Leaf
- The Great Kabab Factory
- Yo Berries

== Shopping ==
There are markets in almost every part of Dhaka, where household commodities are available. Shopping malls are also found in every major avenue; some of the malls are Dhaka New Market, Basundhara City, Jamuna Future Park, Shimanto Square, Rapa Plaza, Metro Shopping Mall, Concord Twin Towers, BCS Computer City, Navana Tower, Pink City Shopping Mall, Mouchak Market, Eastern Plaza, Fortune Mall, Eastern Plus, Banga Bazar, Razdhani Market, Gausia Complex, Holland Centre, Suvastu Nazar Valley, Confidence Tower, Mollah Tower, Lutfun Tower, Eastern Mallika, Muskut Plaza, North Tower, Razlaksmi Complex, and Multiplan Center. Kudrat-E-Khuda Avenue (formerly known as New Elephant Road) and its surrounding areas are popular shopping destinations. Jamuna Future Park is the 12th largest shopping mall in the world, with a gross leasable area of 4.1 million sq ft, and total area of 5.45 million sq ft.

Chain stores like Shopno, Agora, Meena Bazar, Nondon, and PQS are also found in most of the residential areas of the city. There are many branches of Aarong around the city, where local products including clothing, handicrafts, groceries and home decor are available.

Bangla Bazar is the largest hawker's market in Dhaka. The market is situated near Chankharpul, behind the campus of the University of Dhaka. It is favored by foreigners visiting Bangladesh, and is famed for its reasonably priced cloth. Basundhara City is the second largest mall in the country, and has more than 2,300 shops and 21 stories.

== Dress ==
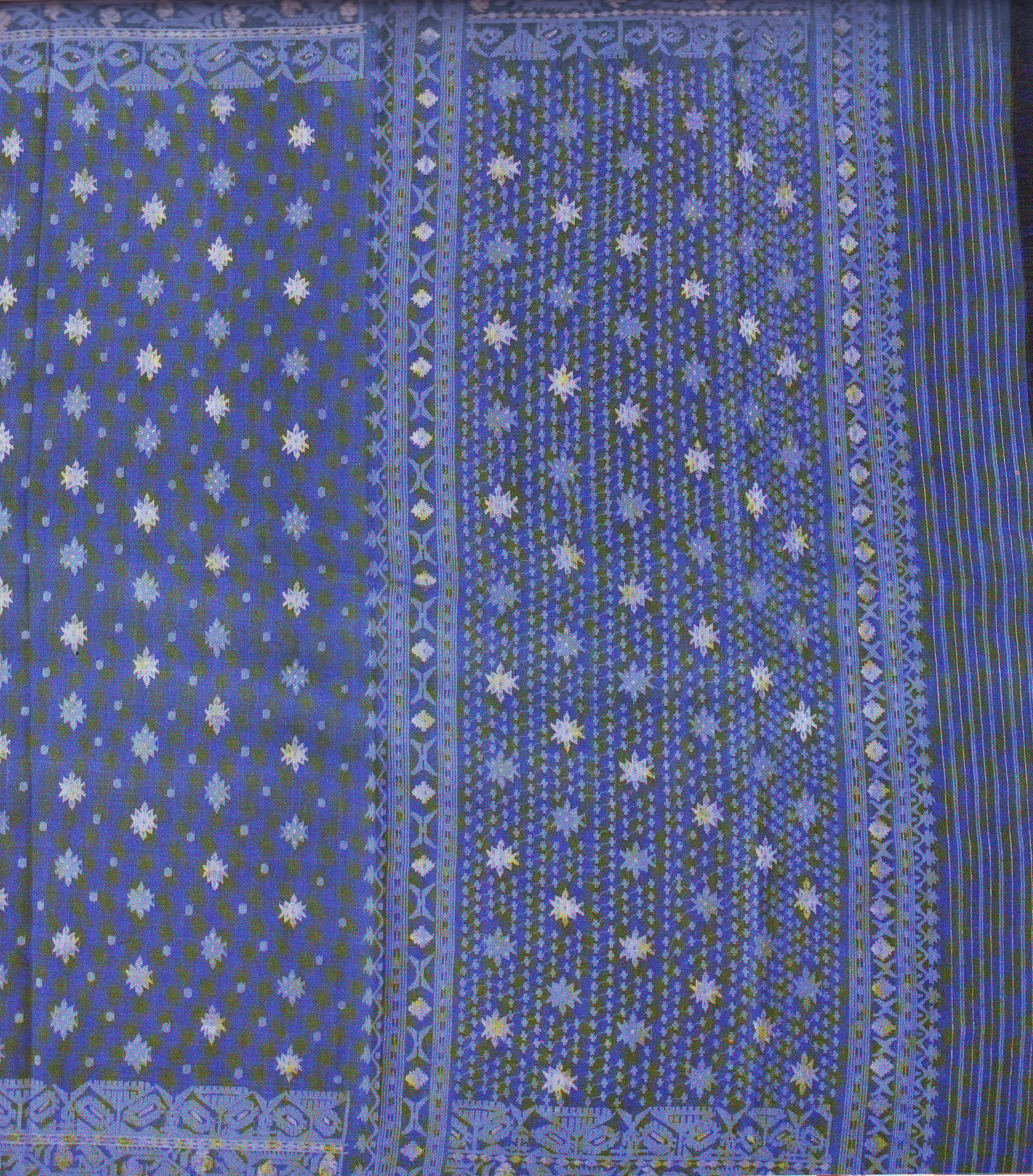
A jamdani-muslin sari in a traditional design

The most popular dressing styles for women are sari or shalwar kameez, while men usually prefer western clothing instead of the traditional lungi. Dhaka is credited for the revival of the jamdani sari, due to the many local sari stores selling and promoting these locally hand-made traditional Bengali saris of fine patterned muslin. Jamdanis are entirely hand woven and originate from the Mughal era. Jamdanis are produced by a traditional high quality cottage industry, which is slowly dying out due to the slow production process. A single medium-range Jamdani sari may take as long as 3 months to complete.

== Heritage ==
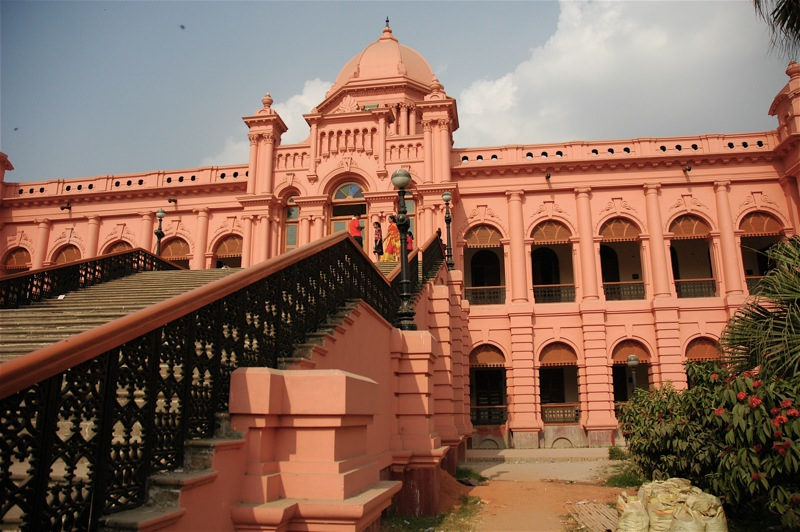
Ahsan Manzil, also known as the Pink Palace. It is located in Kumartoli

The Old City of Dhaka is home to over 2,000 buildings built between the 16th and 19th centuries, which form an integral part of Dhaka's cultural heritage.

- Lalbagh Fort
- Ahsan Manzil
- Dhaka University
- Star Mosque
- Chowk Bazaar
- Dhakeshwari Temple
- Shankhari Bazaar
- Swami Bagh Temple
- Ramna Kali Mandir
- Dhaka Sadarghat
- Armanitola, Armenian quarter
- Farashganj, French quarter

== Academies ==
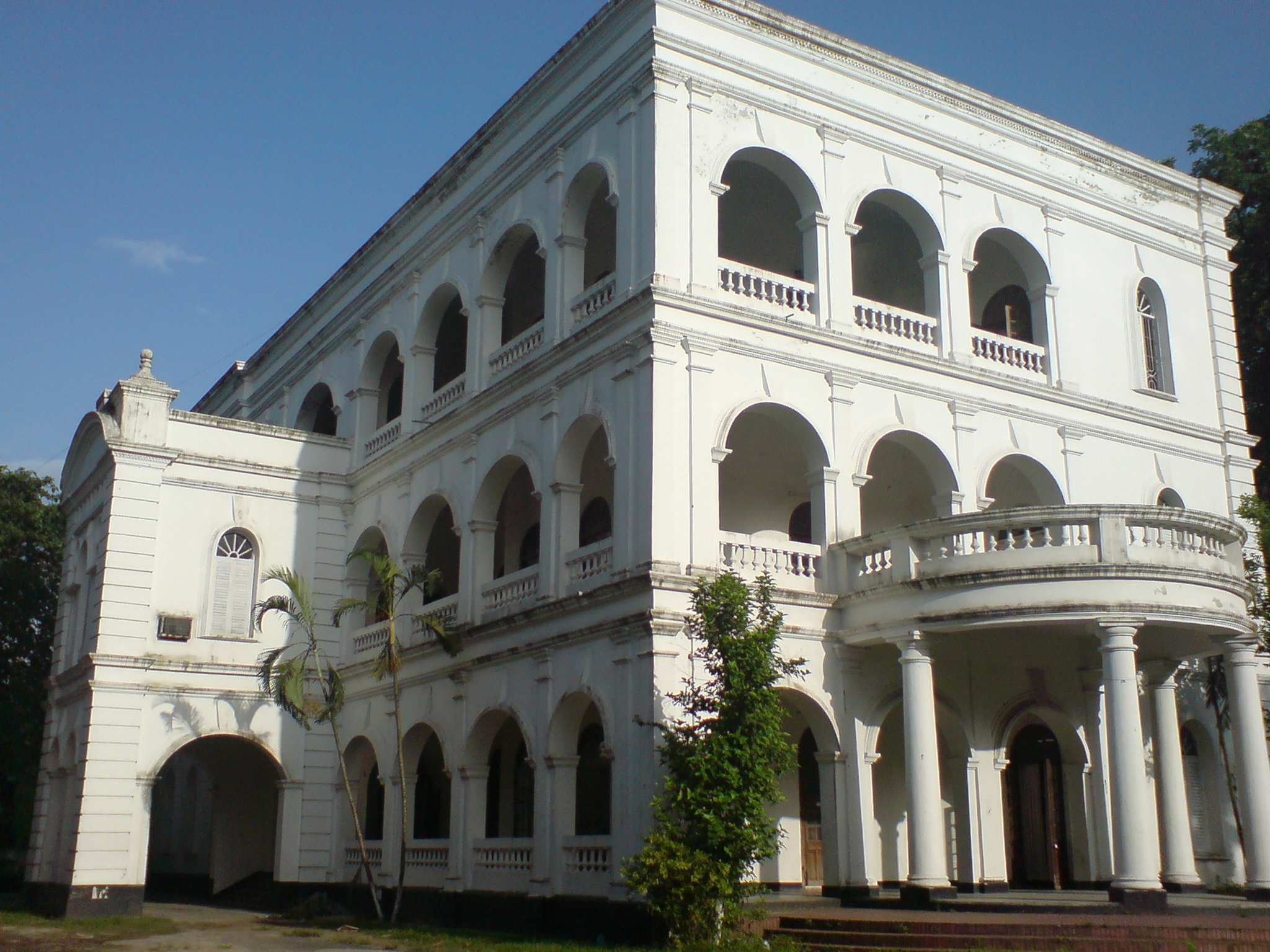
Burdwan House is home to the Bangla Academy.

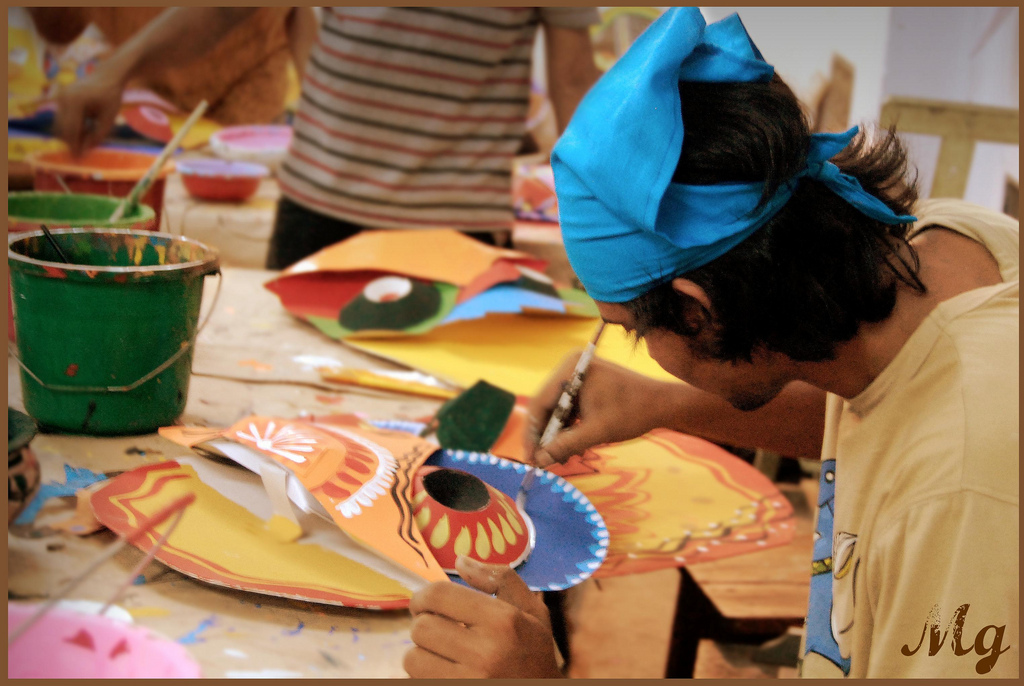
University of Dhaka students prepare for Bengali New Year celebrations at the Faculty of Fine Arts

- Bangla Academy
- Asiatic Society of Bangladesh
- Faculty of Fine Arts
- National Performing Arts Academy
- Pathshala
- Islamic Foundation of Bangladesh
- Bishwo Shahitto Kendro (World Literature Center)

== Museums and art galleries ==
- Bangladesh National Museum
- Liberation War Museum
- Drik Picture Library
- Ahsan Manzil
- Bangladesh Military Museum
- Bangladesh Air Force Museum

== Major parks, lakes and gardens ==
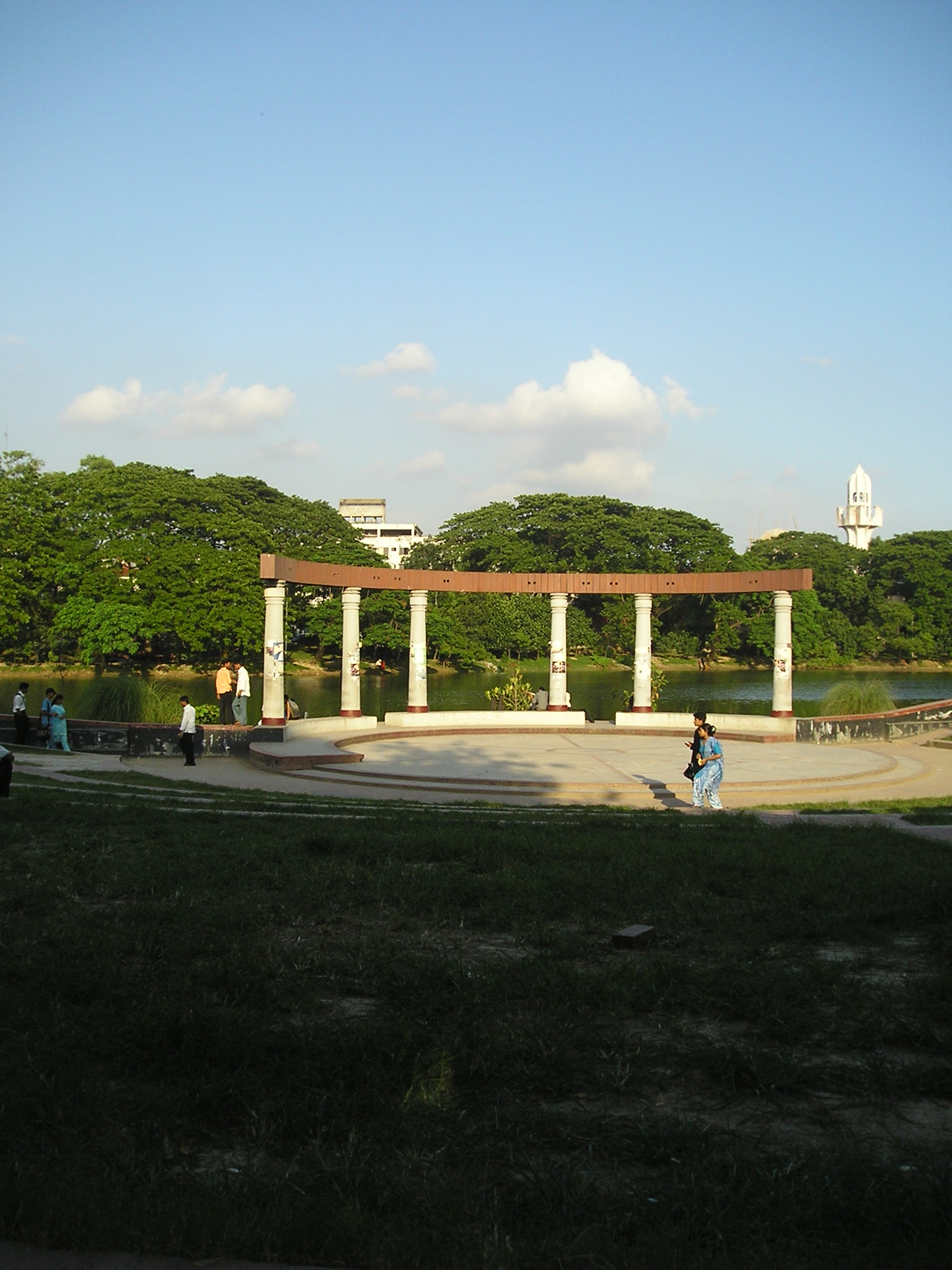
An amphitheater in Dhanmondi lake

- Ramna Park
- Hatirjheel
- Suhrawardy Udyan
- Zia Udyan
- Baldha Garden
- Dhaka Zoo
- National Botanical Garden of Bangladesh
- Justice Shahabuddin Ahmed Park
- Shahid Dr. Fazle Rabbi Park
- Dhanmondi Lake
- Gulshan Lake
- Fantasy Kingdom Theme Park

== Religious and Cultural Festival ==
- Eid al-Fitr
- Eid al-Adha
- Muharram
- Shab-e-Barat
- Durga Puja
- Krishna Janmastami
- Diwali or Kali Puja
- Ratha-Yatra
- Shakrain
- Holi
- Bengali New Year
- Bohonto Utshob, Bengali Spring Festival
- Nazrul Joyonti, the birthday of Kazi Nazrul Islam
- Rabindra Joyonti, the birthday of Rabindranath Tagore
- Ekushey Book Fair
- Hay Festival Dhaka
- Bengal-ITC SRA Classical Music Festival
- Dhaka Art Summit
- Dhaka World Music Festival

== Official religious holidays ==
- Eid al-Fitr
- Eid al-Adha
- Muharram
- Mawlid
- Shab-e-Barat
- Durga Puja
- Krishna Janmastami
- Buddha Purnima
- Christmas

== See also ==
- Culture of Bangladesh
- Culture of Chittagong
- Culture of Kolkata
