= Hoppipola =

Hoppipola may refer to:

- "Hoppípolla", a song by Icelandic post-rock band Sigur Rós
- Hoppipolla, a chain of bars owned by Speciality Restaurants Limited
