= Ketan Kadam =

Indian entrepreneur and restaurateur

- Born: Mumbai
- Education: University of Mumbai
- Occupations: Entrepreneur; Restaurateur
- Known for: Founder of Maroosh; Founder of Fire n Ice; Founder of Two One Two Bar and Grill; Victoria e-Carriages
- Spouse: Punita Kadam
- Children: Nyra Kadam

Ketan Kadam is an Indian entrepreneur and restaurateur. He is the chairman and managing director of Impresa Hospitality Management Pvt. Ltd and has owned and co-owned a number of successful businesses, including the Fire n Ice nightclub, the quick-service Maroosh restaurant chain, and the Two One Two Bar and Grill. He owns restaurants across India and in Sri Lanka, Singapore, and Hong Kong and won an award from People for the Ethical Treatment of Animals (PETA) for a non-restaurant tourist business.

== Education ==
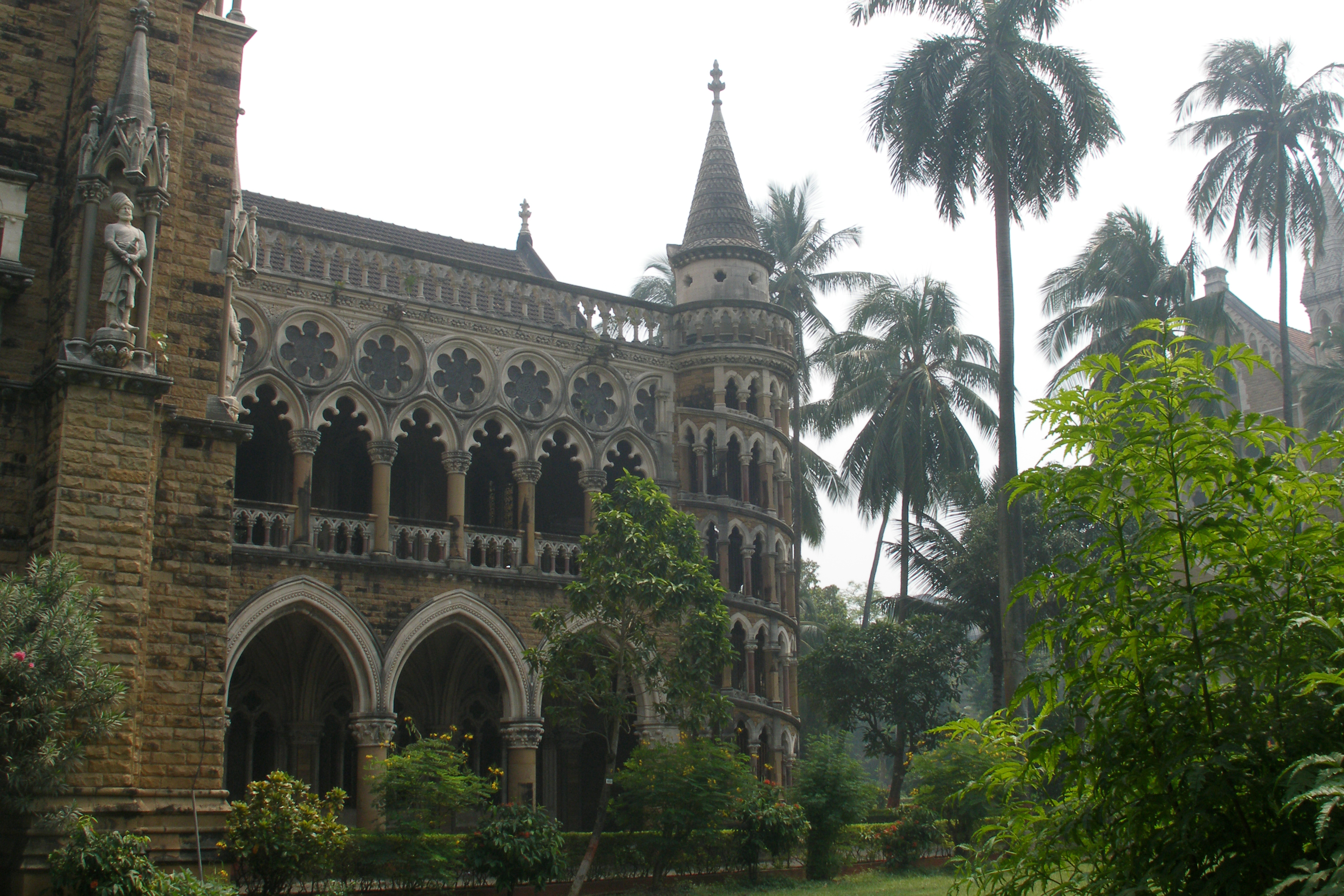
University of Mumbai

Kadam, who grew up in Mumbai, has a Bachelor of Arts degree from the University of Mumbai and a Diploma in Hotel and Catering Technology.

== Career ==
=== 1990s ===
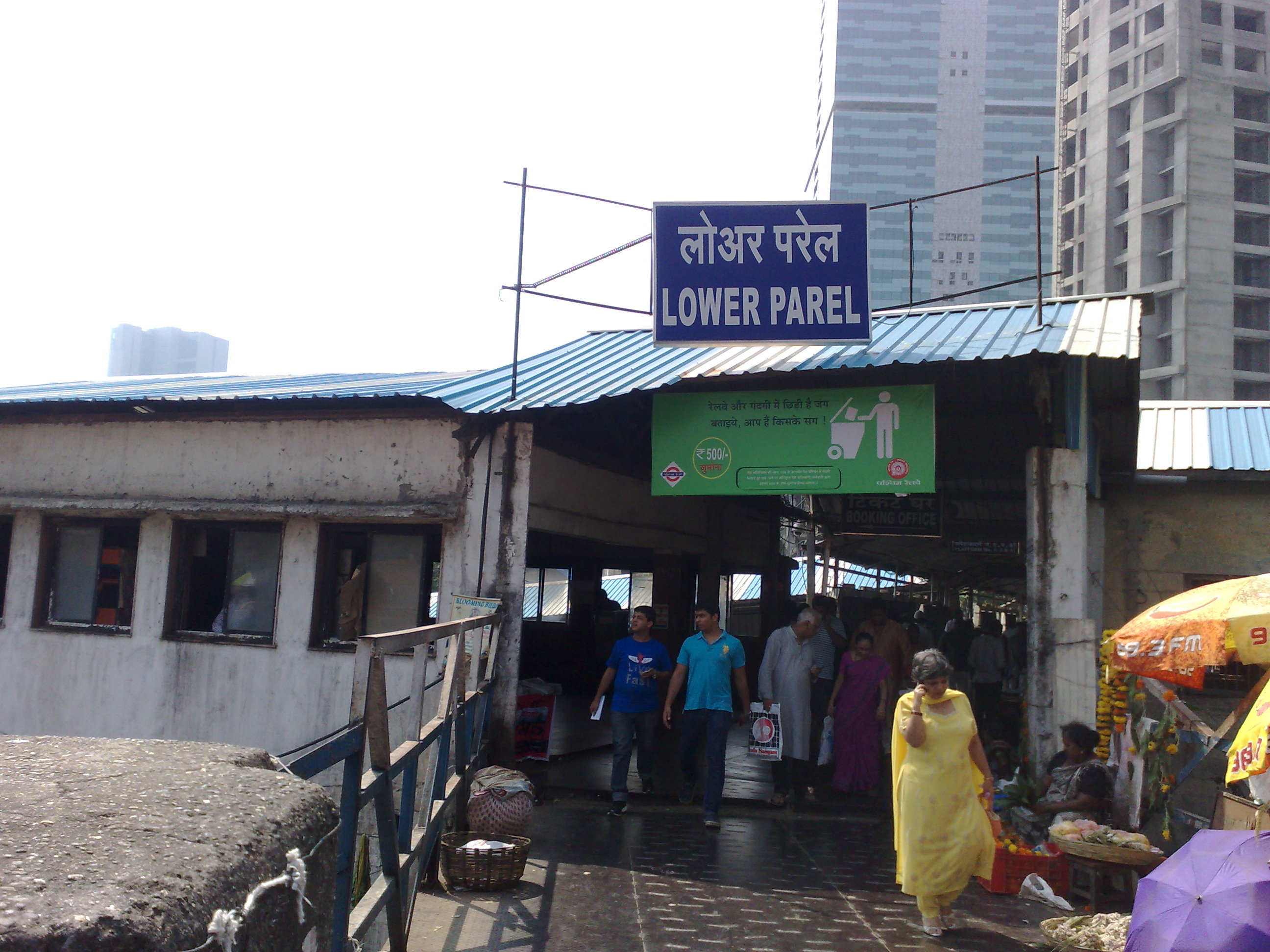
Lower Parel, India

In an early venture, Kadam launched the successful Fire n Ice nightclub in 1999 in Lower Parel along with partners Vishal Shetty, Rajiv Shah, and Neeraj Rungta. The nightclub was one of the first in Mumbai and one of the most popular, with a strong draw from the junior college and college crowd. In April 2014, Kadam and Shetty threw a reunion party on the 15th anniversary of the launching of Fire n Ice, which closed in 2004.

=== 2000s ===
At 22 or 23 years of age, Kadam mortgaged his home in 2000 to help launch the Lebanese restaurant Maroosh. The restaurant expanded into a quick-service chain. In 2014, Kadam sold 43% of the chain's shares to UTV founder Ronnie Screwvala.

=== 2010s ===
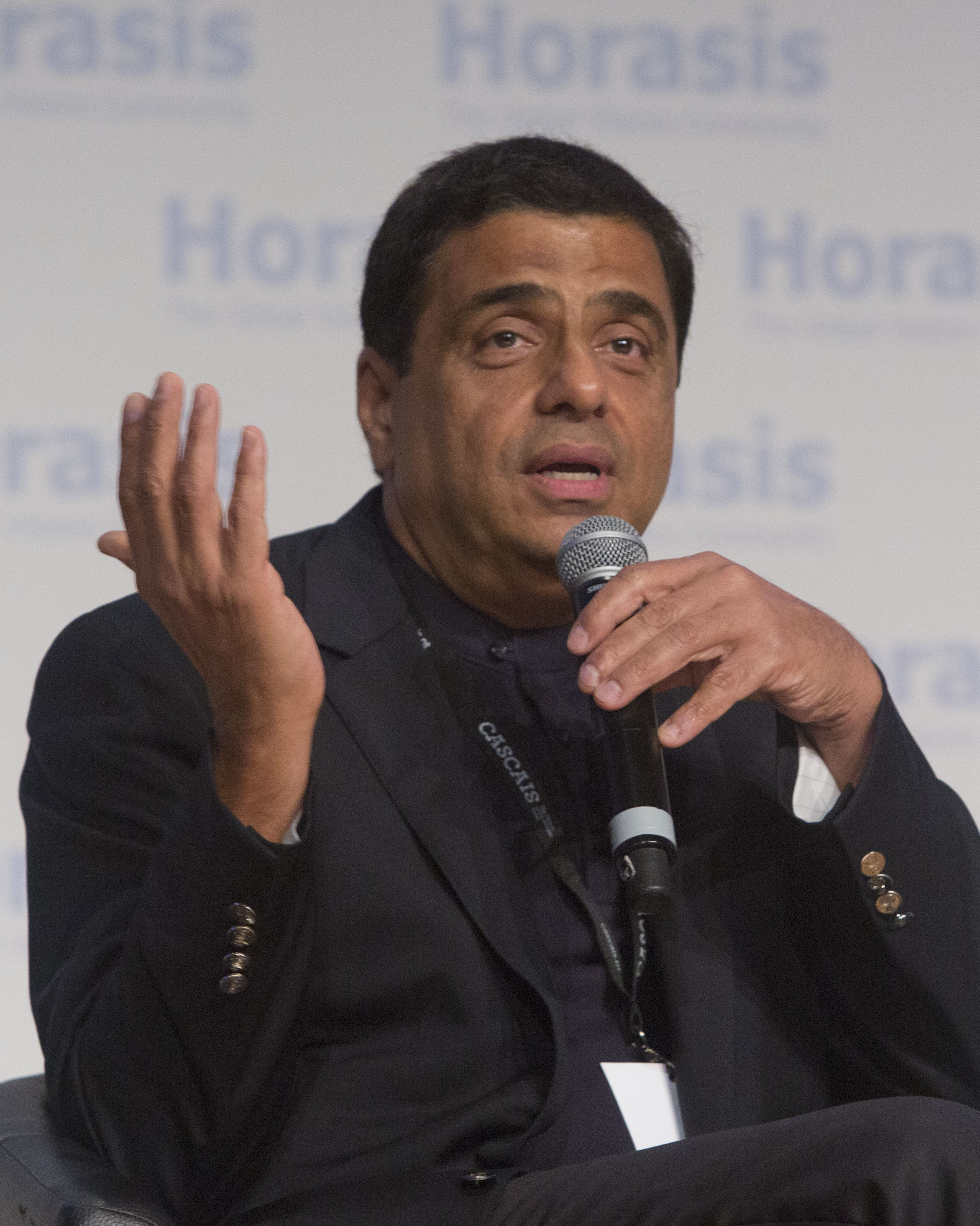
Ronnie Screwvala, who bought 43% of Maroosh’s shares in 2014

In 2010, Kadam and partners Arish Khajotia, Gaurav Kapur, and Jay Makhijani opened the fine dining Italian restaurant Two One Two Bar and Grill in Worli. In its review of the restaurant, The New York Times wrote that it was frequented by the "glamour set." Khajotia and Kadam had a public falling out in 2012 when the former disputed the fairness of share-holding agreements related to their business ventures.

In 2012, Kadam opened the first in a planned series of budget restaurants, the Cafe Sundance in Churchgate. In 2014, he opened quick-service restaurant "Sliders" in Bandra, the first in a planned chain.

As of 2013, he was working towards opening bars in Colaba, Bandra, and Malad.

Although he started his career with nightclubs, by 2015 he started leaving the alcohol business. He made this decision partly because he saw more opportunity for growth in restaurants and partly because of the "headache" involved in a business that primarily sells alcoholic beverages.

== Awards ==
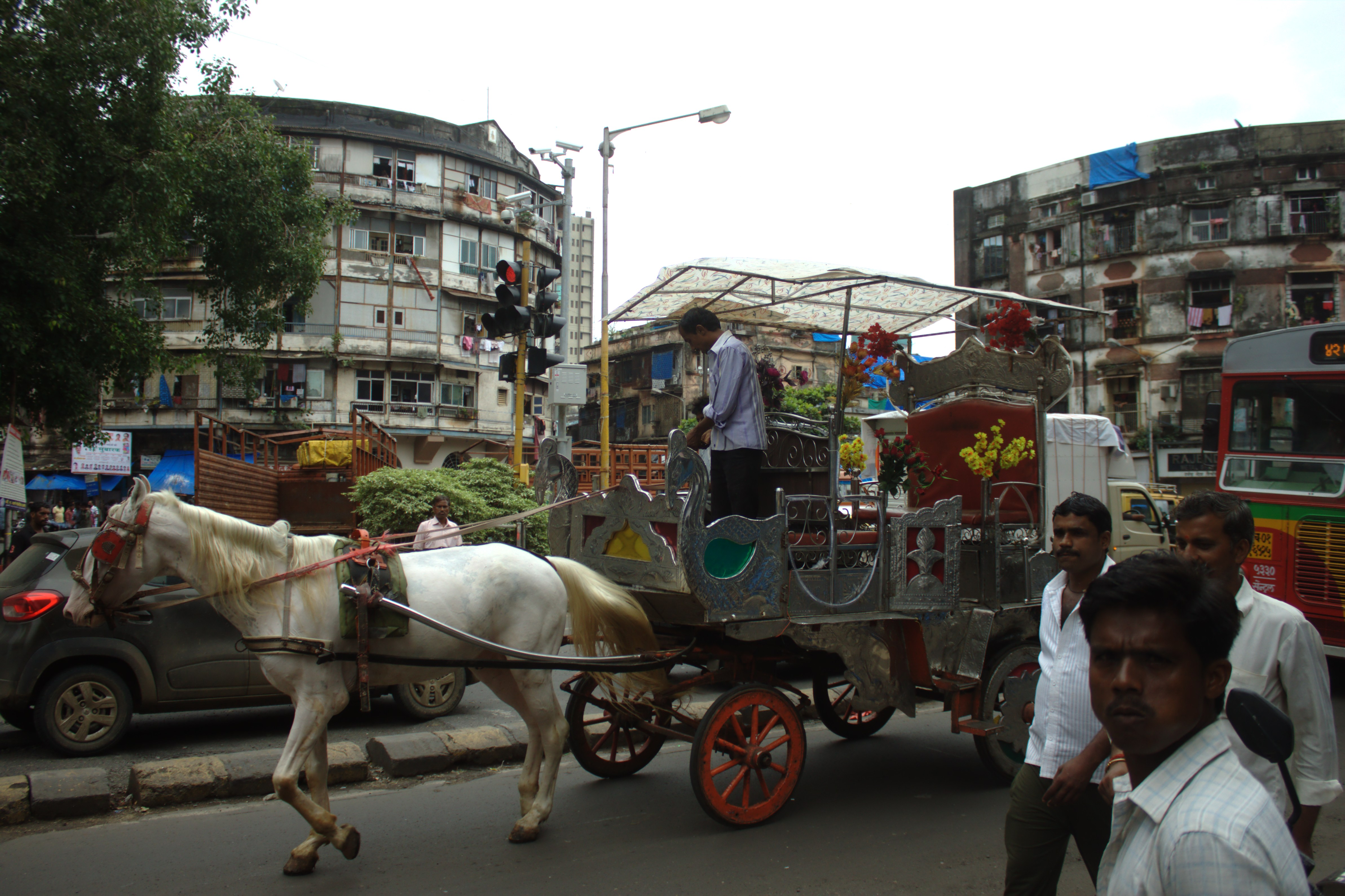
A horse-drawn cartridge in Mumbai

In 2019, Kadam and actor Dino Morea jointly received the "Innovative Business Award" from People for the Ethical Treatment of Animals for a business venture that would replace horse-drawn carriages for tourists in Mumbai with battery-powered electric carriages. He tested a prototype of the carriage by driving his daughter to her school bus stop each morning.

== Invention ==
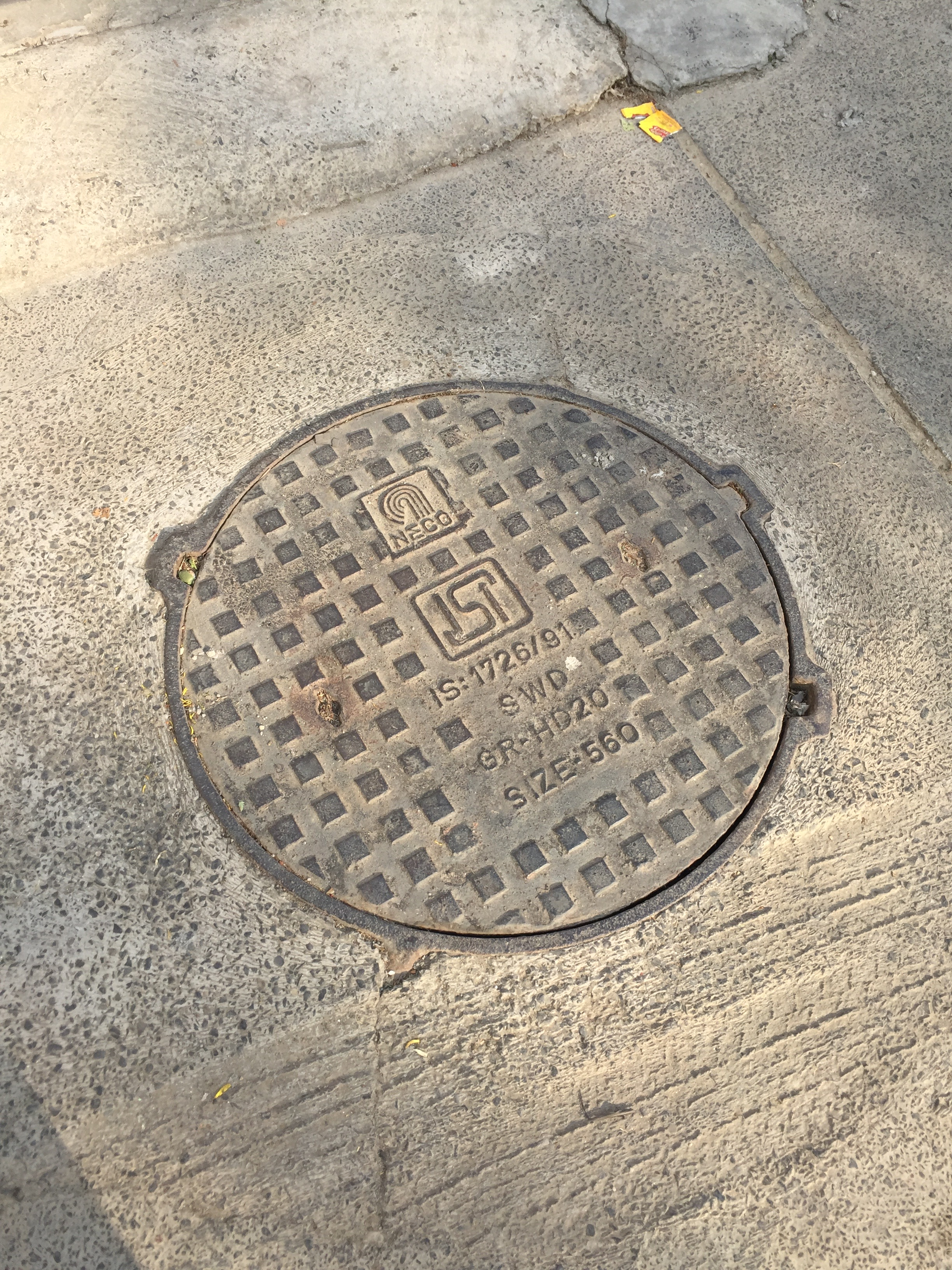
Round manhole cover

In 2017, Kadam invented an anti-theft device for manhole covers. The heavy metal safety devices are sometimes stolen for their value as scrap metal. “I am planning to get clamps that can be locked from inside and can be opened with key-like tools that can be operated only by an authorised person. I also want to put sensor lights on the grid cover, which can light up on contact with water. This would be helpful for warning people if the main cover is missing or unlocked,” Kadam said.

== Personal life ==
Kadam is married and has a daughter.
