= DhakaFM 90.4 =

Dhaka FM 90.4
- Dhaka; Bangladesh
- Frequency: 90.4 MHz

Programming
- Format: Music radio

History
- First air date: 1 January 2012

Technical information
- Transmitter coordinates: 23.7807°N 90.4163°E

Links
- Website: www.dhakafm904.com

Dhaka FM is a Bengali-language FM radio station in Dhaka, Bangladesh. DhakaFM began broadcasting on 1 January 2012. Dhaka FM is 24-hour broadcast radio station running 19+ hours of live programs.

== Frequent programs ==
Shows like Wake Up Bangladesh, Canteen 90.4, My City My Tune, Be Cool and Flight Number 904 air 6 days a week from Saturday beginning at 8 am.

== Special popular shows ==
These shows are aired once a week

- Ondhokarer Golpo
- Account No 90.4
- Bhalobashar Diary with Guru Ehtesham
- Akash Choyar Golpo
- Bhalobashar Bangladesh with Guru Ehtesham
- Therapy
- FM Dosti with FM Guru Ehtesham
- Cut Uncut
- Super Tunes
- Rongin Dhaka
- Music Buzz
- Jibon Golpo with RJ Kebria
- Secrets with RJ Kebria

== Technical facts ==
Frequency: 90.4 MHz

Capacity: 10KW

Antenna gain: 6 dB

Polarization: Circular (8 bay)

Data service: RDS and DARC transmission
