= Anjan Chatterjee =

Indian hotelier (born 1960)

Anjan Chatterjee অঞ্জন চট্টোপাধ্যায়
- Born: 16 February 1960 (age 66); New Delhi, India
- Occupation: Hotelier
- Known for: Establishing the Mainland China
- Spouse: Suchhanda Chatterjee
- Children: Avik Chatterjee (Son) Harshita Chatterjee Deshpande (Daughter)

Anjan Chatterjee (Bengali: অঞ্জন চট্টোপাধ্যায়) (born 16 February 1960) is an Indian hotelier and founder of Speciality Restaurants Limited.

== Biography ==
Anjan was born on 16 Feb 1960 and he grew up in many places in India. He went to Modern School in Delhi and completed graduation from Ravenshaw College, Cuttack. Then he did his hotel management degree from Institute of Hotel Management and Catering Technology, Kolkata. His father Snehamoy Chatterjee was director in Jute Agricultural Research Institute near Kolkata. Anjan spent around 6 years (from 1978 to 1984) in the staff quarter of this Institute Shaheb Bagan.

After graduating from Institute of Hotel Management and Catering Technology, Kolkata, in 1982, Anjan joined Taj Group of Hotels in Mumbai. Then he joined ABP Group in the marketing department. In 1985, he started his own advertising agency, Situations Advertising.

In 1992, Anjan started his first restaurant named Only Fish (now Oh! Calcutta) in Mumbai. In 1995, he started the speciality Chinese restaurant brand Mainland China in Sakinaka area in Mumbai.

Anjan Chatterjee started the companies Mainland China, Mainland China Asia Kitchen, Oh! Calcutta, Sigree, Sigree Global Grill – Powai & Malad in Mumbai, Pune & Bangalore & Kolkata, Cafe Mezzuna, Haka, Flame & Grill, Machaan, Sweet Bengal, and Mobifeast.

In 2012, his holding company Specialty Restaurant Limited went public.
