= Radio Aamar =

Coordinates: 23.7811°N 90.4169°E

- Dhaka, Bangladesh; Bangladesh
- Broadcast area: Bangladesh
- Frequency: 88.4 FM

Programming
- Language: Bengali
- Format: Music radio

History
- First air date: December 11, 2007

Links
- Website: www.radioaamar.com

Radio Aamar (88.4 FM) is a commercial broadcast radio station in Dhaka, Bangladesh. It has a relay station in Chittagong on 101.4 MHz. The station carries a music, news, and talk format, and has produced original radio dramas. It was launched on 11 December 2007.

== History ==
Radio Aamar began broadcasting from Dhaka on 11 December 2007, on 101 MHz. It provided music and news programming, but Srabonti Narmeen Ali, writing for The Daily Star, stated that interactive shows and in house serial radio dramas were the station's real strength. One of the phone-in shows was Amar Bhalobasha, in which listeners talked about their love lives.

Radio Aamar avoided playing Hindi music except during its international music programmes, and even then played an average of only three or four Hindi songs a day. It had a program for underground bands.

In March 2008, it became a Voice of America affiliate. It broadcast VOA's weekly call-in show Hello Washington and, six days a week, the first 30 minutes of VOA's one-hour Bengali-language program.

By 2009, it had a relay station in Chittagong on 101.4 MHz. Around early 2010, its broadcasting in Dhaka moved to 88.4 MHz.

The station preferred that its radio jockeys use accurate Bengali on air, but also encouraged them to be themselves, which led to frequent use of a more youth-oriented Banglish.
