= The Chocolate Room (cafe) =

Australian chocolate cafe chain

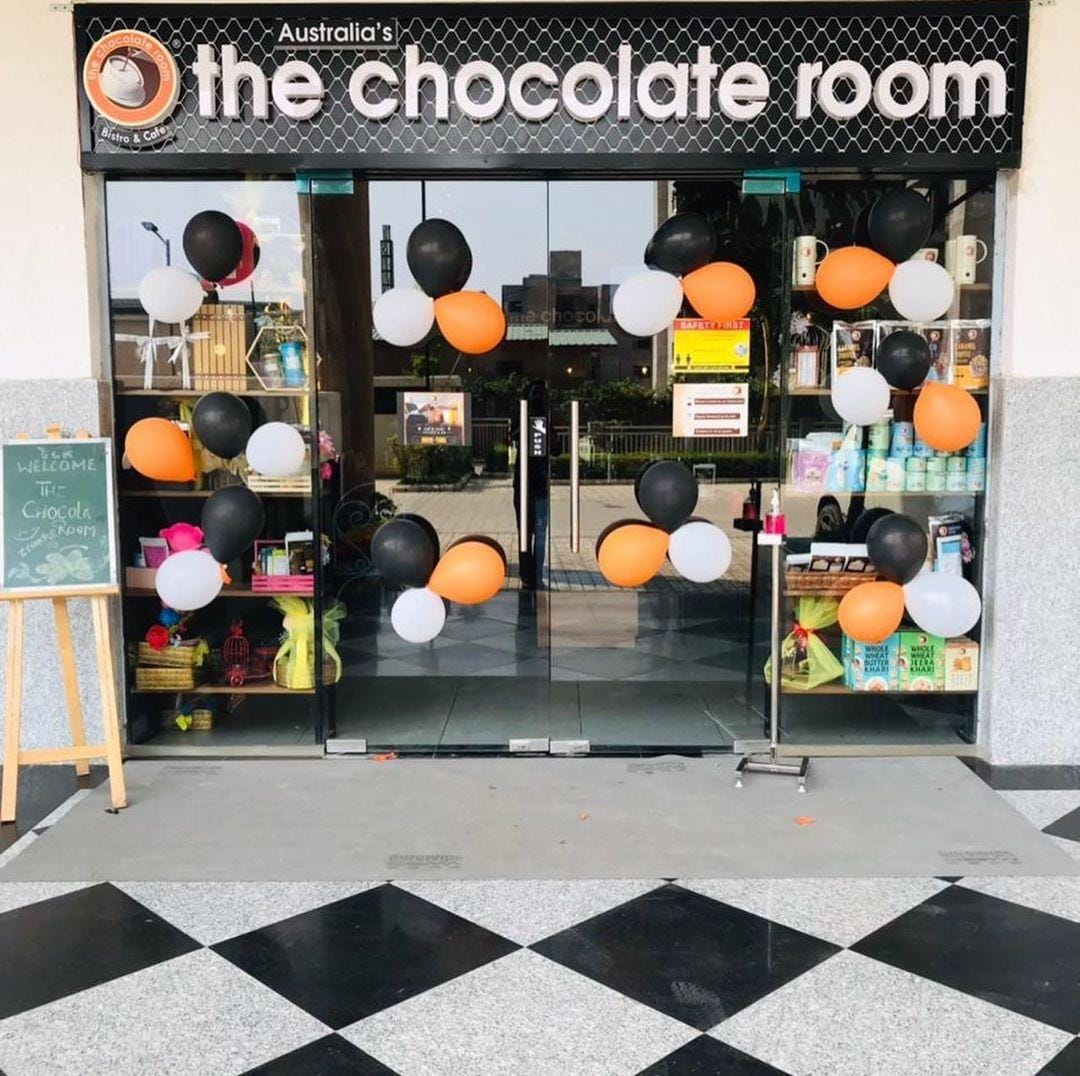
- Storefront of store
- Trade name: The Chocolate Room
- Type: Subsidiary of TCR International Food Group
- Industry: Cafe
- Founded: 2006; 20 years ago
- Headquarters: Sydney, Australia
- Number of locations: 235 stores (2017–2021) (2021)
- Area served: Worldwide
- Key people: Yaju Vaghela (CMD) Aus; Koshish Shah (Director); Chaitanya Kumar Lingamallu (CMD) India; Vikas Panjabi (Director)
- Products: Hot chocolate; Tea; Coffee; Pastries; Chocolate Ice Cream
- Revenue: 100 crores ($150 million)
- Number of employees: 3000 (2018)
- Parent: TCR International Food Group
- Website: www.thechocolateroom.com.au

The Chocolate Room (TCR Cafe) is a chocolate cafe chain founded in Geelong, Australia, by Yaju Vaghela and Koshish Shah in 2006 and acquired by the TCR International Food Group in 2007.

== History ==
The Chocolate Room opened its branches in Colombo, Sri Lanka, in the year 2013. The Chocolate Room opened its Outlet in M.M.Alam Road, Lahore, Pakistan, in the year 2016.

The Chocolate Room opened its 5th Outlet store in Bengaluru, India, in the year 2017. The Chocolate Room opens its branches in Dhaka, Bangladesh, in the year 2019. The Chocolate Room's 299th outlet is opened in Nepal in June 2019. The Chocolate Room has its outlet in Abu Dhabi, UAE.

The Chocolate Room Decided to open the co-working lounge in Hyderabad, India, in the year 2019.

Among the total outlets of the Chocolate Room 180 are in India and rest of them in other countries like Oman, China and others.

The Chocolate Room is started in 2007 and now it is grown to 235 stores across India with the turnover of over ₹100 crore.

== See also ==
- Café Coffee Day
- Tata Starbucks
- Costa Coffee
