= Flurys =

Tea room and pastry shop in Kolkata, India

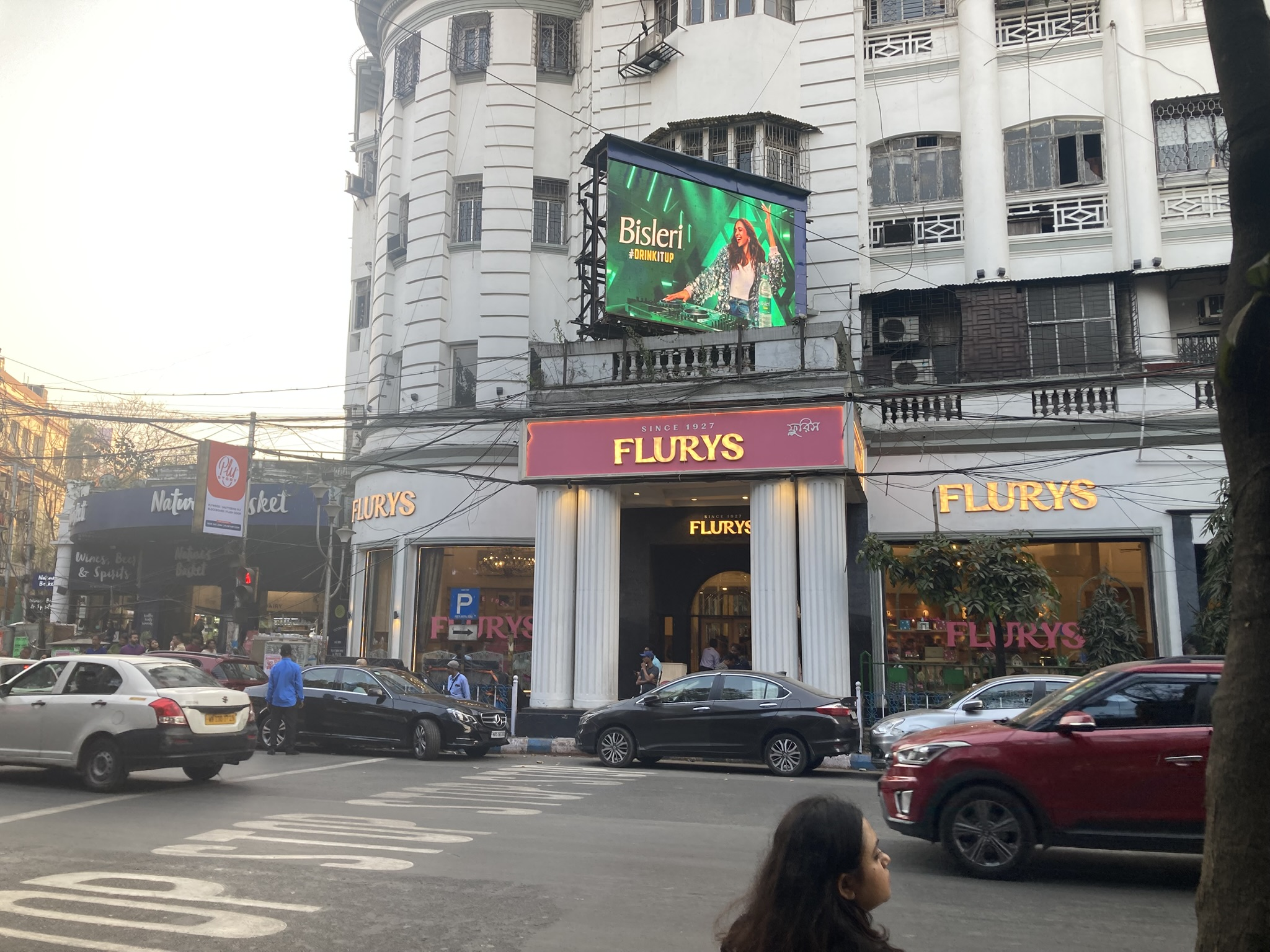
Street view of Flury's pastry shop at the Park Street in Kolkata

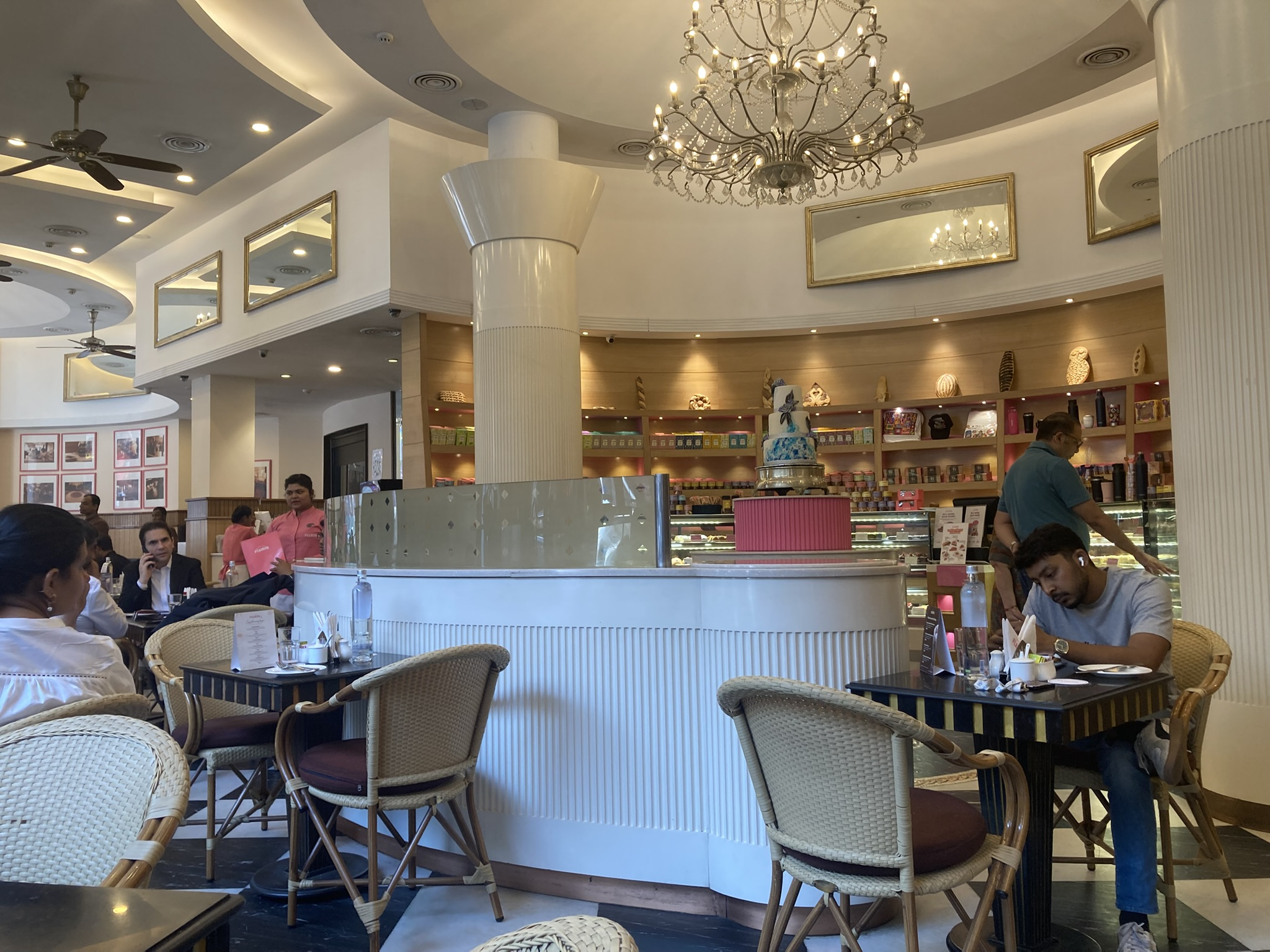
Interior view of Flury's confectionery shop with sales counter at the Park Street in Kolkata

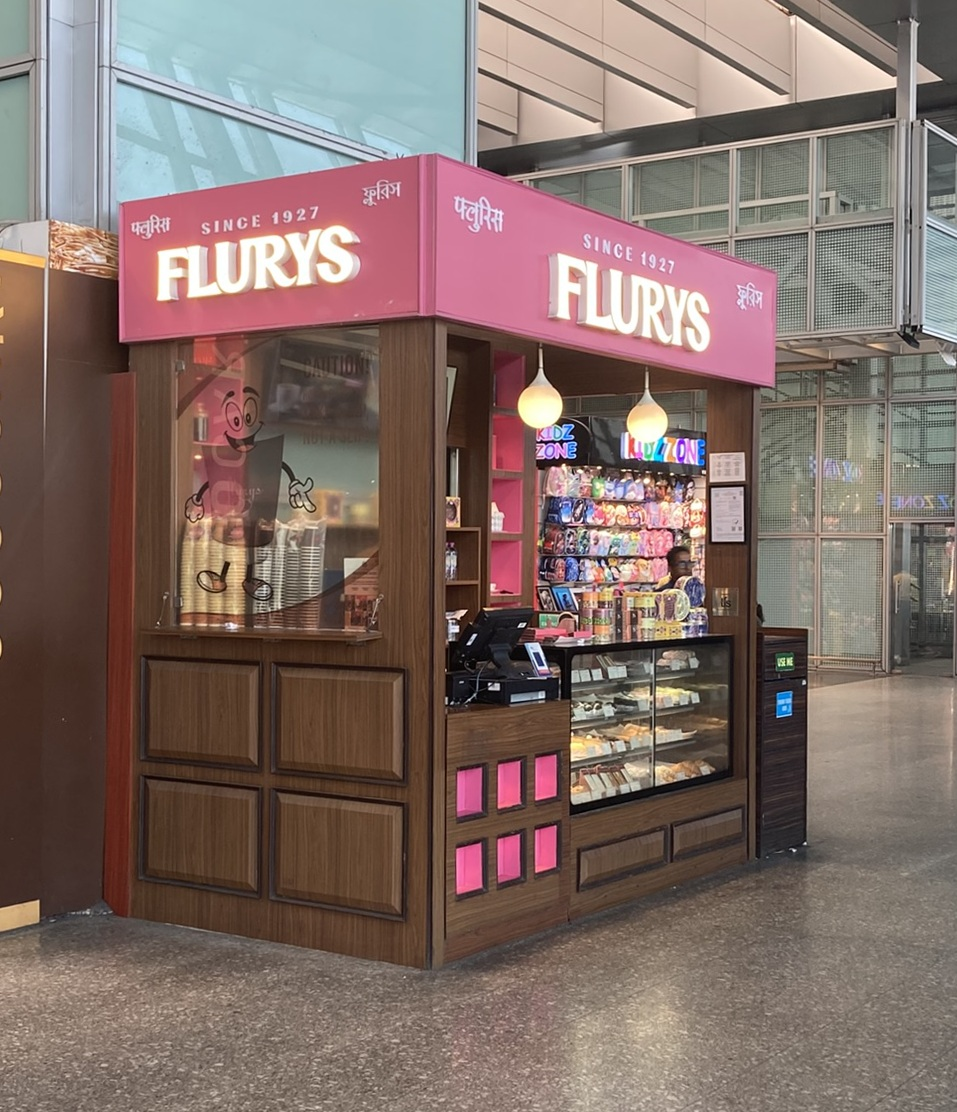
Flurys sales kiosk at the Netaji Subhas Chandra Bose International Airport in Kolkata

Flurys is a tearoom and pastry shop primarily based in Kolkata with various locations in India. The oldest store was established in Park Street. Today Flurys serves pastries, chocolates, puddings and cakes specialized to cuisines from around the world. Flurys is regarded as one of the finest places for dining in all of Kolkata.

The establishment was first opened in 1927 by the two Swiss business partners Joseph Flury and Quinto Cinzio Trinca. The name was at the beginning Flury & Trinca. The partnership lasted until 1939, when it was dissolved for unknown reasons. Cinzio Trinca opened another tea room called Trincas, located diagonally opposite Flurys at 17 Park Street. Ten years later, in 1965, Joseph Flury wanted to return to Switzerland, so he sold his tea room to Jit Paul, who had started the Park Hotel across the street by then. Paul integrated Flurys in the Kolkata-based Apeejay Surrendra Group, a conglomerate founded by his father.

In 2013, Flurys expanded to several locations in Kolkata and opened its first location outside the city in Mumbai at the Navi Mumbai Airport. In 2016, the franchise announced that it would sell tea bags in neighborhood grocery stores. By summer 2025, the brand had around 15 outlets in Mumbai, and several in Chennai, as well as two each in Hyderabad and Bhubaneswar and one in Delhi, Indore, and Gangtok. In the rest of Bengal, Flurys has locations in Durgapur, Serampore, and Chandannagar in southern Bengal, and six locations in northern Bengal, including two in Siliguri and one in Darjeeling.
