= Drunken Monkey (smoothie bar chain) =

Smoothie bar chain in India

- Company type: LLP
- Industry: Smoothies
- Founded: 2016; 10 years ago in Hyderabad
- Founder: Samrat Reddy
- Headquarters: Hyderabad, India
- Number of locations: 100+ India
- Key people: Mithun Nataraj, Anand Kumar
- Products: Smoothies, Smoothie Bowls, milkshakes, coffee, protein food
- Website: thedrunkenmonkey.in

Drunken Monkey is a chain of smoothie bars headquartered in Hyderabad, India. It was founded by Samrat Reddy in February 2016 with the registered company name "White Monkey F&B LLP". As of November 2020, the chain has over 97 outlets across 43 Indian cities. Its outlets range from quick-service café style locations to smaller kiosks.

The company sells blended fresh-fruit smoothies, smoothie bowls, Açaí na tigela and juices in over 170 combinations. Secondary products include coffee blends, and, milkshakes.

== Locations ==
Currently, the brand has outlets in Hyderabad, Chennai, Agra, Bangalore, Coimbatore, Tiruchirappalli, Pune, Pondicherry, Delhi NCR, Kolkata, Nellore, Vijayawada, Rajahmundry, Visakhapatnam, Indore, Ahmedabad, Surat, Guwahati, Jalandhar, Jabalpur, Vellore, Nagpur, Thiruvananthapuram, Palakkad, Bhubaneshwar, Warangal, Noida, Kochi, Madurai, Nizamabad, Thrissur, Mangalore, Mysore, Bhilai, Kozhikode, Salem, Kadapa, Pondicherry, Karur, Perinthalmanna, Tiruvannamalai, Kakinada, Guntur, Raipur, as well as other cities.

== Expansion ==
After opening its first four outlets in Hyderabad, the company began offering outlet franchises, expanding to include more than 50 outlets by December 2018. As of December 2021, the company has 120+ outlets across India and aims to increase the number of its outlets to 200 by the end of 2022, while growing its employee base from 50 to 100 employees over the same period. The company then plans to expand internationally.

== Founder ==
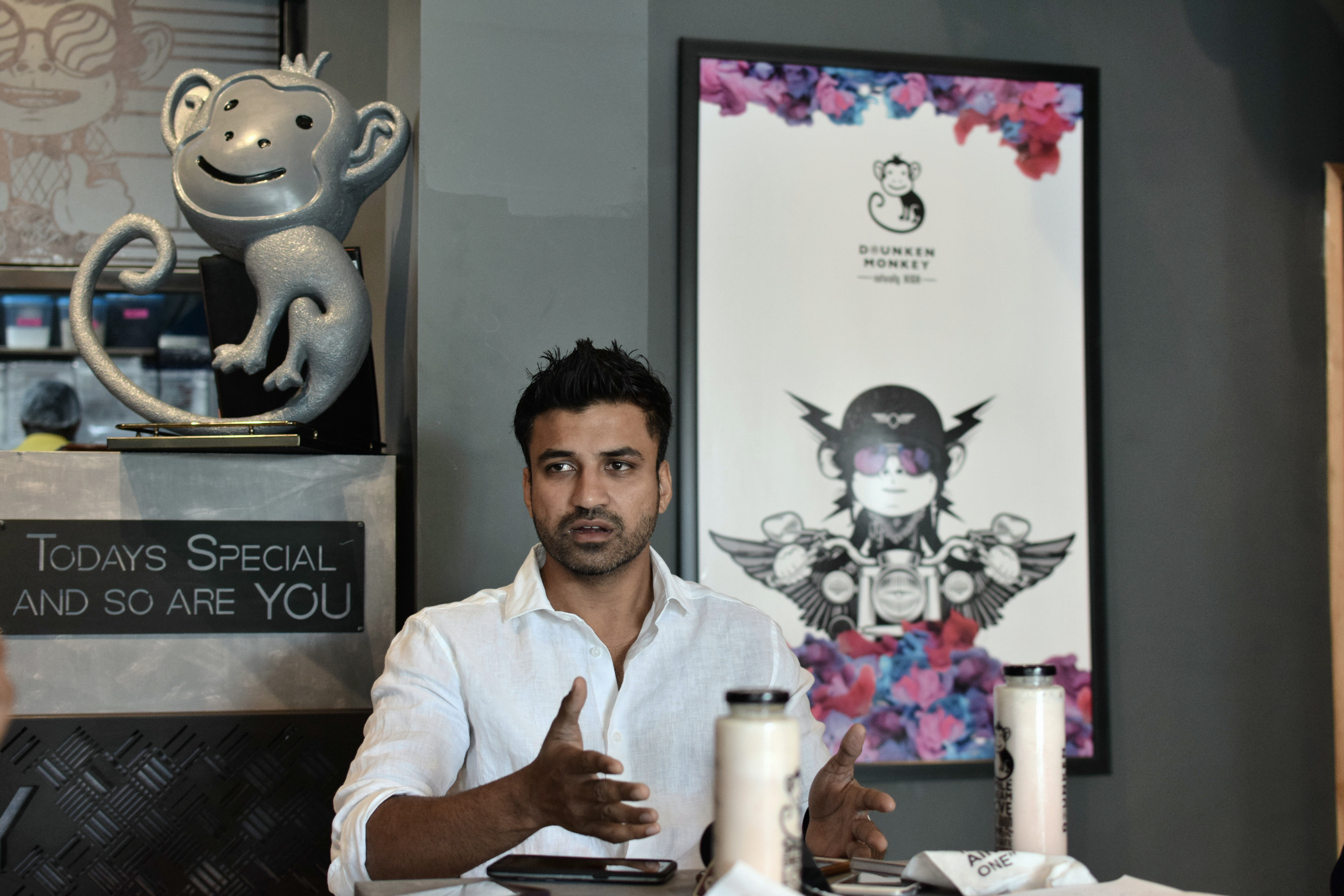
Samrat Reddy, Founder, Drunken Monkey (smoothie bar chain)

Samrat Reddy (born 15 April 1985) is an Indian entrepreneur who founded Drunken Monkey (White Monkey F&B LLP) in 2016. He created the tagline 'Naturally High' for the brand.

Reddy studied electrical engineering at Easwari Engineering College, Chennai, earning a Bachelor's degree in 2006. He then worked at the Melbourne office of Infosys as a test engineer from July 2006 to August 2007. He attended the University of Strathclyde, Scotland, for a one-year MBA program, where he wrote a thesis on smoothies. He earned an MBA in Marketing in 2008.

He served as the Director of Operations and Marketing at Hestia Studios from 2008 to 2012, as the Director at SVS International (a leather manufacturer) from 2008 to 2014, as the General Manager of Operations at Delta Steel Structures Pvt. Ltd. from 2012 through 2013, and as Business Strategy and HR specialist at Sindhan Designs PVT Ltd from 2013 to 2014.

In 2015, Reddy started experimenting with smoothie recipes, developing standard formulas for each of the company's signature smoothie blends. He founded Drunken Monkey in January 2016.
