= Dindigul Thalappakatti Restaurant =

Restaurant chain in Tamil Nadu, India

Coordinates: 10.3641416°N 77.9388289°E

- Type: Private
- Industry: Restaurant
- Genre: Biryani Focused Casual Dining Restaurant Chain
- Founded: 1957; 69 years ago
- Founder: Nagasamy Naidu
- Headquarters: Chennai, Tamil Nadu, India
- Number of locations: 90 (in India), 15 (outside India)
- Area served: Tamil Nadu, Karnataka, Kerala, Sri Lanka, UAE, Malaysia, France, Singapore, United States
- Key people: Nagasamy Dhanabalan (Executive Chairman)
- Services: Casual Dining, Take Away, Home Delivery and Outdoor Catering.
- Number of employees: 2800+ (2022)
- Website: www.thalappakatti.com

Dindigul Thalappakatti Restaurant (also known as Thalappakatti Biriyani) is a restaurant chain that operates primarily in the Indian state of Tamil Nadu. The first outlet was opened in 1957 at Dindigul. Since then, it operates with over 105+ outlets globally with 90 outlets in India, and 15 outlets overseas. The Thalappakatti restaurants focus on biryani as the core product.

== History ==
The founder, Nagasamy Naidu, started Dindigul Thalappakatti restaurant by the name of Anandha Vilas Biriyani Hotel in Dindigul, Tamil Nadu. In 2013 the chain won a trademark lawsuit about the use of the word "thalappakatti" (meaning "turban" in Tamil).

== Locations ==
Dindigul Thalappakatti Restaurant has 80+restaurants, with 92 outlets in India & 9 overseas outlets in countries like Sri Lanka, the United Arab Emirates, Malaysia, France, Singapore and the United States.
