= Golam Kebria Sarkar =

Bangladeshi YouTuber

- Born: March 30, 1983 (age 43); Khulna District
- Other name: RJ Kebria
- Education: University of Dhaka
- Occupations: Television presenter; Media personality; Content creator
- Years active: 2007–present

YouTube information
- Channels: Kebria RJ; Studio of Creative Arts Ltd
- Years active: 2007–present
- Genres: Interview; Podcast; story; vlog
- Subscribers: 2.88 million
- Views: 356 million
- Last updated: November 11, 2026

Md. Golam Kebria Sarkar (born 30 March 1983) popularly known as RJ Kebria, is a Bangladeshi radio jockey (RJ), television presenter and content creator. He is known for his radio programmes and social media content, particularly the YouTube programme Apan Thikana, which helps reunite people with their separated family members. He is the founder of Studio of Creative Arts. Sarkar became first Bangladeshi content creator to be featured on YouTube's official blog.

== Early life and education ==
Sarkar was born on 30 March 1983 in Khulna District and grew up in Bogura District. His father was Md. Abdul Hannan Sarkar and his mother is Rabeya Begum. He has one brother and one sister. He began his education at Bathia Bhanga Primary School. He later studied at Thakurgaon BDR School in Ramchandrapur and completed his secondary education at Cantonment Board School and Higher Secondary Certificate examination from Cantonment Public College. He studied public administration at University of Dhaka, where he completed both his bachelor's and master's degrees with first-class results. He later completed an MPhil degree in the same field.

== Career ==
He began his broadcasting career at MM Radio. He worked in radio broadcasting for approximately 11 years and became known as RJ Kebria. He later worked as a media professional and held the position of Deputy Executive Producer. One of his popular radio programmes was Hello 8920, which received UNICEF awards in 2013 and 2015. Another programme, Jaha Bolibo Sotto Bolibo, received a UNICEF award in 2014. These programmes helped establish his reputation as a radio presenter.

In addition to radio, Sarkar worked in television for approximately five years. He became a presenter of Ranga Sokal, a morning television programme broadcast by Maasranga Television.

He has also been involved in media education. He works as a Radio Adviser Faculty at University of Liberal Arts Bangladesh (ULAB), where he is associated with radio and broadcasting activities.

In December 2023, he became first Bangladeshi content creator to be featured on YouTube's official blog. The feature, titled Championing Reunions: How One Creator in APAC Helped Nearly 350 Estranged Families Reconnect, highlighted his work through the YouTube series Apan Thikana. He started the programme in 2020 during the COVID-19 pandemic to help people find family members from whom they had been separated. According to YouTube, more than 400 episodes of the programme had been produced over three years, helping nearly 350 families reunite. The series was inspired by ''Lost and Found'', a programme he had previously presented on radio.

== Awards and achievements ==
- UNICEF Award for the radio programme Hello 8920, 2013
- UNICEF Award for the radio programme Jaha Bolibo Sotto Bolibo, 2014
- UNICEF Award for the radio programme Hello 8920, 2015
