= Ratna Cafe =

Indian fast food restaurant chain

- Type: Fast food chain
- Industry: Food
- Founded: 1948
- Founder: TrilokNath Gupta
- Headquarters: Chennai, India
- Key people: Rajendra Gupta
- Products: South Indian food, sweets

Ratna Cafe is a South Indian fast food restaurant chain and F&B services firm headquartered in Chennai, India. It operates restaurants and food courts in Tamil Nadu. It was initially named Ratna Cafe, it was rebranded as Triplicane Ratna Cafe after the brand started expanding to various parts of Chennai City. Ratna Cafe is one of the longest-standing restaurants in Chennai, popular for its sambar-idly and unique taste maintained over the years.

== History ==
Ratna Cafe or Triplicane Ratna Cafe was founded and established in 1948 by Mr. Jaggilal Gupta, originally hailing from Mathura, Uttar Pradesh.

Rajendra Gupta, the current promoter of the group, acquired it from his uncle Mr. Trilok Nath Gupta in 2002 and continued developing the business by expanding outside its flagship store in Triplicane. The group is currently headed by Lokesh Gupta, the fourth generation successor who took over the reins of the restaurant business from Rajendra Gupta in 2012.

In 2006, Ratna Cafe established itself in the field of Corporate and Institutional catering.

== See also ==
- South Indian cuisine
