= Subbayya Gari Hotel =

Indian vegetarian restaurant chain

- Company type: Privately held company
- Industry: Restaurant
- Genre: Telugu cuisine
- Founded: 1950
- Founder: G. Subbayya
- Headquarters: Subbayya Gari Junction, Kakinada, Andhra Pradesh, India
- Area served: India
- Key people: G. Srikanth
- Products: Meals; Sweets; Pickles; Vadiyalu
- Services: Take Away; Home Delivery; Outdoor Catering
- Owner: G. Srikanth
- Website: subbayyagarihotel.com

Subbayya Gari Hotel (also known as Kakinada Vaari Subbayya Gari Hotel) is an Indian chain of vegetarian restaurants headquartered in Kakinada, Andhra Pradesh. Founded in 1950 by G. Subbayya, the establishment is renowned for its traditional Andhra cuisine, particularly its signature "Butta Bhojanam" served on banana leaves.

== History ==
In 1950, G. Subbayya established a modest hotel mess with ten employees, serving meals for just 50 paisa. Subbayya had migrated from Prakasam district to East Godavari district after Indian Independence, driven by his passion for bringing delicious and hygienic food at affordable costs.

In 1955, Subbayya relocated his operation to Kakinada and established a hotel originally named Sri Krishna Villas at what is now known as Subbayya Gari Junction. The restaurant quickly gained popularity throughout the Telugu states for its authentic Andhra bhojanam, particularly the "Butta Bhojanam".

In 2018, Subbayya Gari Hotel opened its first branch in Hyderabad, marking the beginning of its expansion beyond Kakinada. The chain subsequently established multiple locations across Indian cities, including Visakhapatnam, Bengaluru, Chennai, and Suryapet.

In 2018, the chain opened its first restaurant in Hyderabad and later spread throughout other Indian cities.

== Cuisine ==
=== Signature Dish: Butta Bhojanam ===
The restaurant's flagship offering is the "Butta Bhojanam," which translates to "Basket Bhojanam" in Telugu. This traditional Andhra meal is served in baskets made with banana leaves and includes plain rice, pappu (dal), sambar, vegetable fry, majjiga pulusu (buttermilk curry), pickles, sweets, podi (powders), pulihora (tamarind rice), vegetable curries, curd, appadams, and ghee.

=== Other Menu Items ===
The restaurant offers over 90 varieties of vegetarian dishes, including:

- Vadiyalu
- Single meals
- Panasakaya Biryani (jackfruit biryani)
- Dry Podis (dry powders)
- Andhra sweets
- Vegetable curries (5-8 varieties)
- Andhra pickles (2-3 varieties)
- Jedipappu Boori
- Guthivankaya Kura
- Muntha Perugu
