= New Zealand Natural =

New Zealand ice cream franchise

New Zealand Natural Pty Ltd
- Type: Private
- Industry: Ice Cream production
- Founded: 1984; 42 years ago
- Founder: Rael Polivnick
- Headquarters: Australia; New Zealand (Main); Hong Kong; Indonesia; Ireland; Malaysia; Singapore; South Korea; United Kingdom; Bangladesh; Thailand
- Products: Ice Cream, Smoothies, Juice, Sorbet, Chillos, Shakes

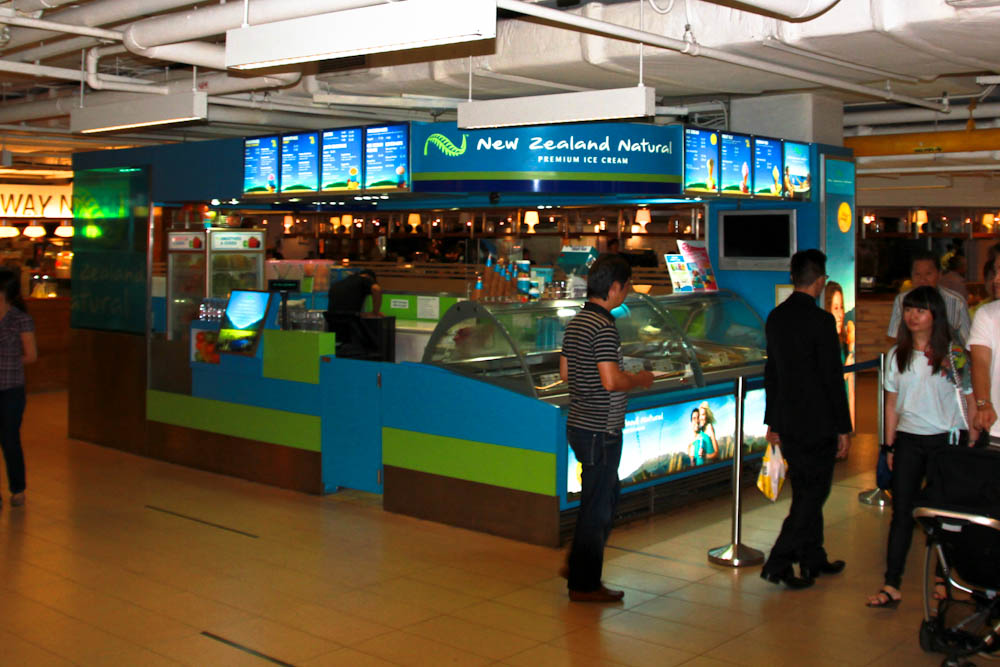
New Zealand Natural location in Singapore, 2011

New Zealand Natural Premium Ice Cream is a global franchise network based in Auckland, New Zealand. It operates as an international franchisor of ice cream, frozen yoghurt, smoothie, juice parlours and mini-parlours, which can be found in shopping centres in Australia, New Zealand, Thailand and other countries. The ice cream is also available at supermarkets throughout New Zealand and Australia.

== Company history ==
New Zealand Natural began as a small ice creamery in Christchurch, New Zealand in 1984 that specialized in ice cream with no artificial colours or flavours. Then by chance, Rael Polivnick, who founded the company, met the owner on a flight crossing the Tasman Sea. Polivnick, seeing the potential, purchased the rights to open a New Zealand Natural store at Bondi Beach in Sydney in 1985.

== Recognition ==
New Zealand Natural has won the Export Award at the Westpac New Zealand Franchise Awards and the SIAL D'Or Award in France.

The company's Gold Pure Vanilla was named best in Category at the 14th New Zealand Ice Cream Awards in 2010.
