= Bengal Classical Music Festival =

Bengal-ITC SRA Classical Music Festival
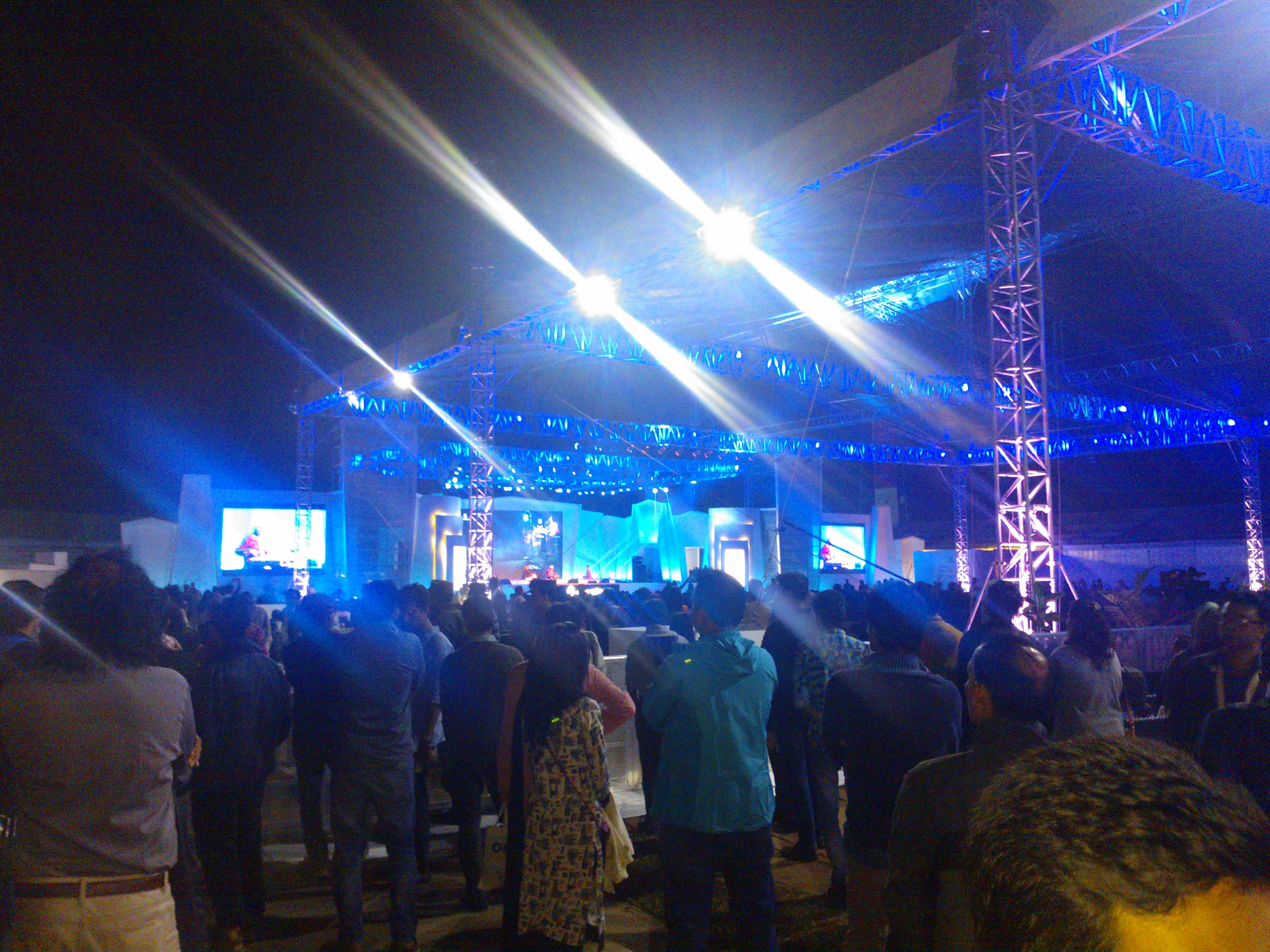
- Genre: South Asian classical music
- Dates: November
- Locations: Dhaka, Bangladesh
- Patrons: Bengal Foundation, ITC Sangeet Research Academy
- Website: bengalfoundation.org

The Bengal-ITC SRA Classical Music Festival is a major South Asian classical music festival held in Dhaka, the capital of Bangladesh. It is one of the world's largest music festivals devoted to South Asian classical music and draws leading musicians from Bangladesh and India.
