= Faasos =

Indian "food on demand" service

- Type: Private
- Industry: Online Food Ordering
- Founded: 2011
- Founder: Jaydeep Barman, Kallol Banerjee
- Headquarters: Mumbai, India
- Parent: Rebel Foods
- Website: https://www.faasos.com/

Faasos is an Indian "food on demand" service that was incorporated in 2004. It is one of the brands owned by the online restaurant company, Rebel Foods.

== History ==
Faasos was founded by Jaydeep Barman and Kallol Banerjee in 2004 and incorporated as it is today, in 2011. The company operates ghost kitchens in 35 cities in India, investing US$50 million into its ghost kitchen network. Faasos launched its mobile app in 2014.

== Funding ==
Faasos raised its first round of funding of US$5 million (Rs. 30 crore) from Sequoia capital in November 2011, a second round of funding of US$20 million in February 2015 from Lightbox Ventures and Sequoia Capital, and a third round of funding of US$30 million in December 2015 from Russian Internet-focused Investment firm ru-Net, Sequoia Capital and Lightbox Ventures. Rebel foods, the parent company of Fassos has received a series D $125 million of funding in June 2019.
