= Rebel Foods =

Indian cloud kitchen company

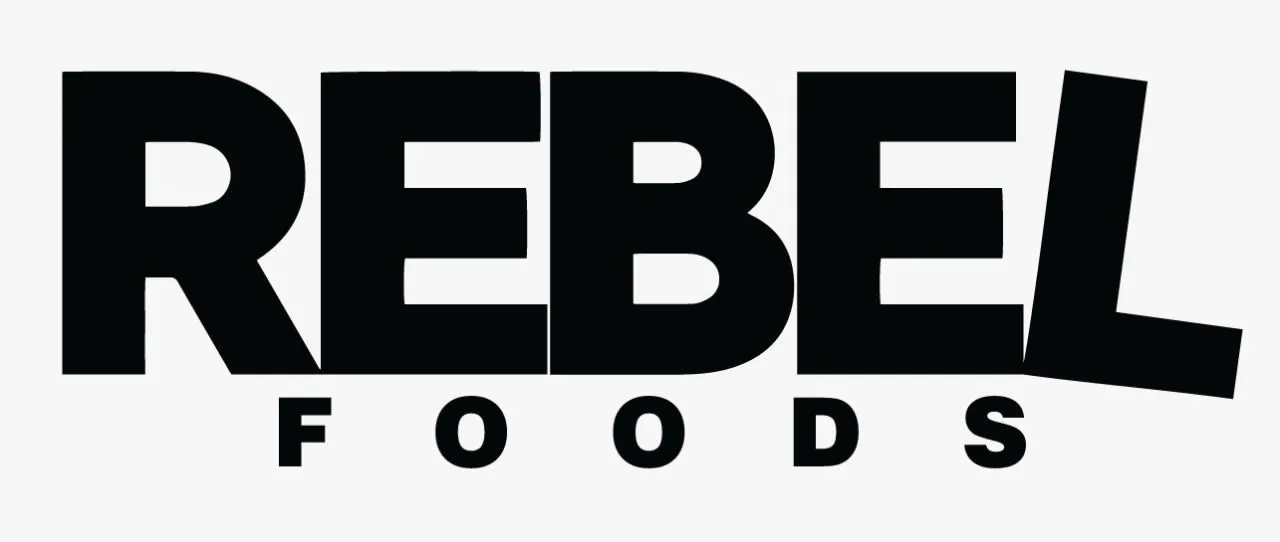
- Type: Private
- Industry: Restaurants; Food and beverage
- Founded: 2011
- Founders: Jaydeep Barman; Kallol Banerjee, Sagar Kochhar, Ankur Sharma, Ankush Grover, Raghav Joshi, Soumyadeep Barman S
- Headquarters: Mumbai, Maharashtra, India
- Area served: Worldwide
- Brands: Faasos, Behrouz Biryani, Oven Story, Mandarin Oak, Lunch Box, The Good Bowl, Sweet Truth, Firangi Bake, The Brooklyn Creamery, The Biryani Life
- Revenue: ▲₹1,195 crore (US$130 million) (FY23)
- Net income: ▲₹−656 crore (US$−70 million) (FY23)
- Number of employees: 6,000 (2020)
- Subsidiaries: Smoor
- Website: rebelfoods.com

Rebel Foods is an Indian online restaurant company which operates 11 cloud kitchen brands including Faasos, Behrouz Biryani and Oven Story. It is the largest cloud kitchen restaurant chain in the world, operating more than 450 cloud kitchens in 10 countries, as of April 2022.

Among the company's biggest stakeholders are Sequoia Capital, Coatue Management, Lightbox Ventures, and Qatar Investment Authority. After its Series F round of funding in 2021, the company's valuation was reported at US$1.4 billion.

== History ==
Rebel Foods was founded in 2011 by Jaydeep Barman and Kallol Banerjee as a physical restaurant chain with an online ordering facility. It launched its first cloud kitchen in 2015, and became a cloud kitchen-only business in 2016.

In 2018, the company started the Rebel Launcher Program for outsourcing its cloud kitchen platform to other restaurant chains.

In 2020, Rebel Foods launched EatSure, a consolidated food delivery service for its brands and partner restaurant chains. It also started operating food trucks known as EatSure Express.

In December 2020, Rebel Foods entered into a partnership with American fast food restaurant chain Wendy's, under which Rebel Foods will start and operate 250 cloud kitchens for the latter in India. In February 2022, Rebel Foods acquired the exclusive master franchise rights for Wendy's offline business in India from Sierra Nevada, to develop and expand the burger chain's brick-and-mortar chain, including the existing commitment to also develop approximately 150 traditional locations over the next decade, in addition to its commitment to open the delivery-only kitchens across the country.

In April 2022, Rebel Foods acquired a majority stake in the luxury chocolate brand Smoor.

== Operations ==
Rebel Foods owns and operates over 450 cloud kitchens in 75 cities in India, Indonesia, United Arab Emirates, United Kingdom, Singapore, Malaysia, Thailand, Bangladesh, Hong Kong, and the Philippines. It also outsources its cloud kitchen facility to third-party food and beverage chains such as Wendy's, Natural Ice Cream, Slay Coffee and Anand Sweets through the Rebel Launcher Program, along with its technology stack called the Rebel Operating System. The company processes orders on its online food ordering platform called EatSure, as well as other online food aggregator and ordering services. It also sells at its cafeterias, lounges and kiosks.

== See also ==
- CloudKitchens
- Postmates
- OrderUp
