= Swami Bagh Temple =

Hindu temple in Dhaka, Bangladesh

Coordinates: 23.7138°N 90.4230°E

- স্বামীবাগ মন্দির
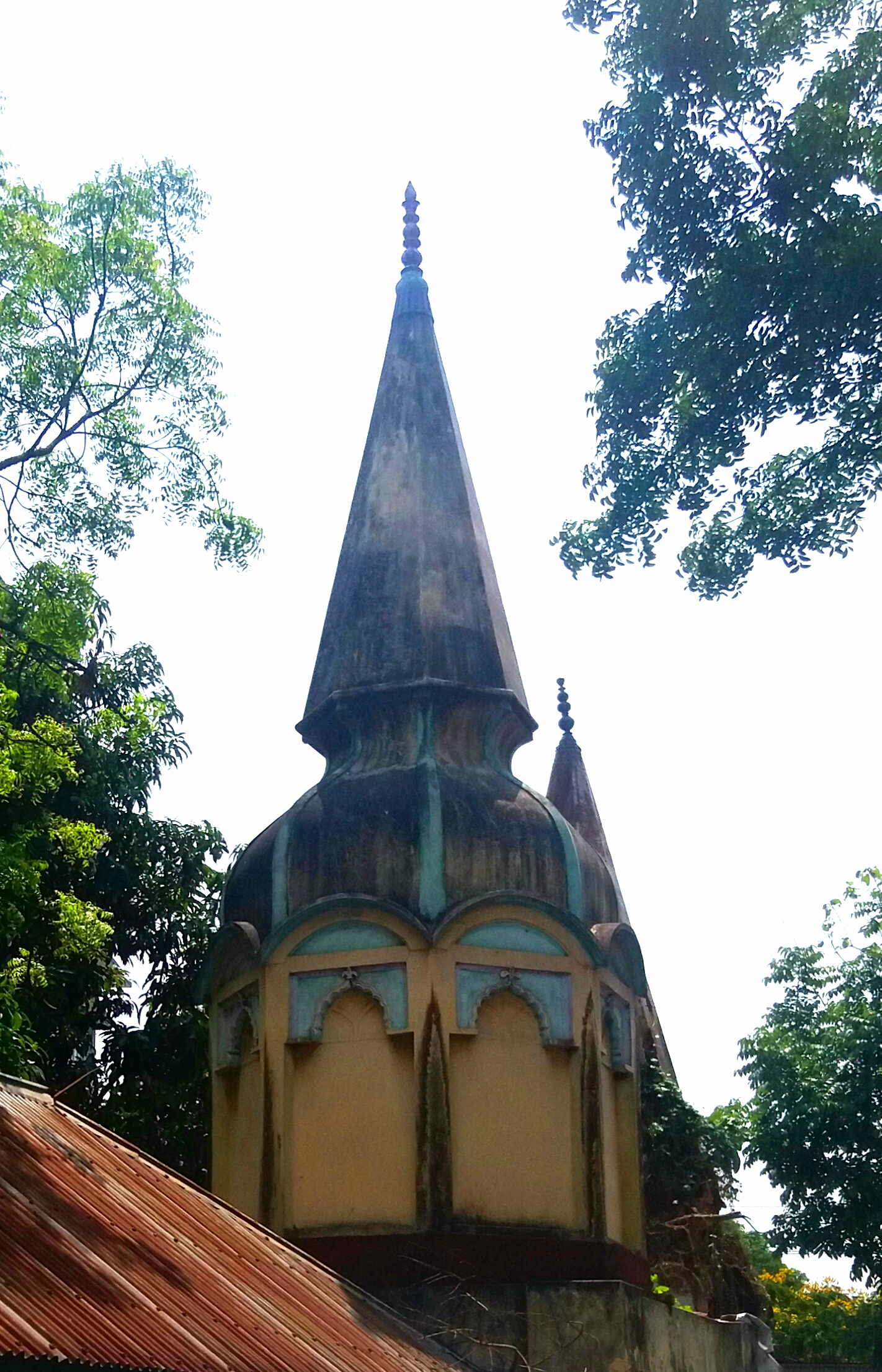
- Shiva temple and Kali temple

Religion
- Affiliation: Hinduism
- District: Dhaka
- Governing body: ISKCON

Location
- Country: Bangladesh
- Interactive map of Swami Bagh Temple

Architecture
- Established: 1902 AD

Swamibagh Temple is a prominent Hindu temple of the Vaishnav culture in Dhaka, the capital of Bangladesh. There are many temples and an ashram managed by ISKCON, of which Swamibagh temple in Bangladesh is prominent. Every year the annual Jagannath Rath Yatra starts from here and proceeds till the Dhakeshwari National Temple.
