= Parsa's =

Indian fast food chain

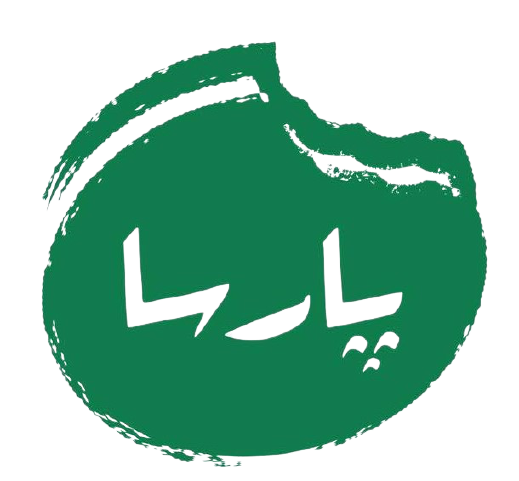
- Parsa's Logo

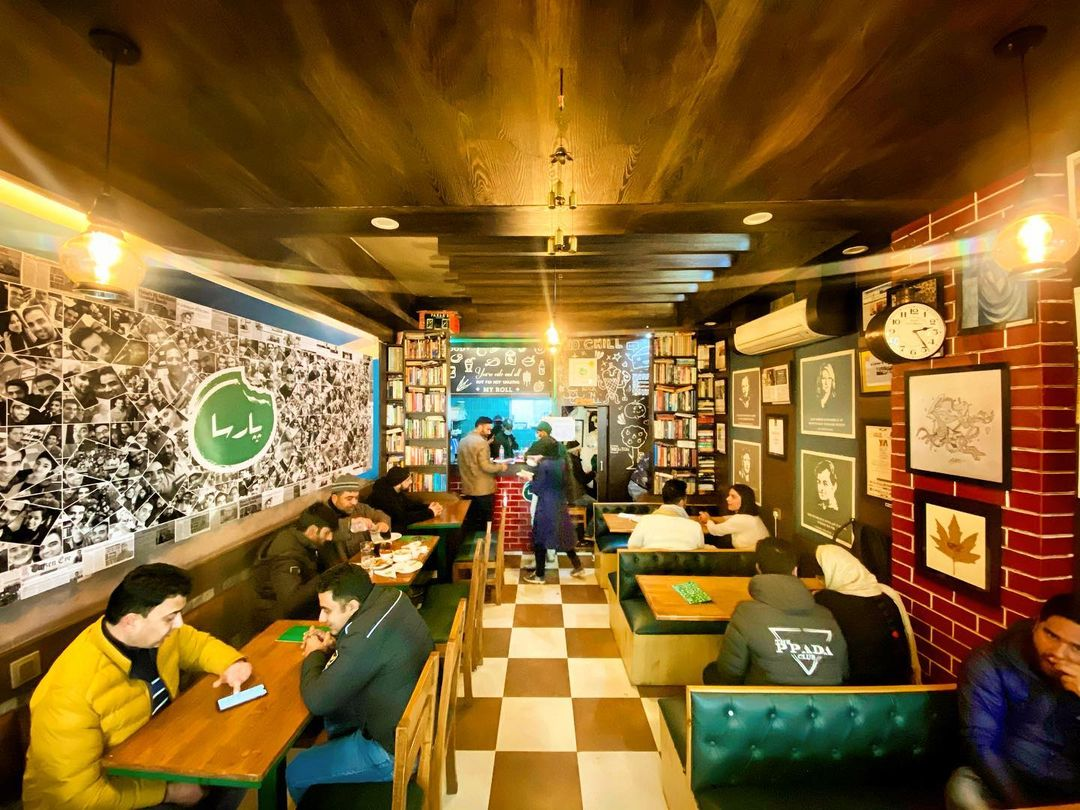
- Parsa's Sara City Centre Srinagar
- Trade name: Parsa's - Food For All
- Native name: پارسا
- Industry: Fast food
- Founded: October 2017; 8 years ago
- Founder: Javid Parsa
- Headquarters: Srinagar, Kashmir
- Number of locations: 35 outlets (2023)
- Parent: Parsa Foods and Beverages Private Ltd
- Website: www.parsafoods.com

Parsa's (Kashmiri and Urdu: پارسا; trading as Parsa's - Food For All) is a Kashmiri fast food chain headquartered in Srinagar, Kashmir. It was founded in 2017 by Javid Parsa. Parsa's currently operates a number of locations across Jammu & Kashmir and Ladakh as well as in few major cities in India. It has 34 outlets throughout India.

Parsa's is the largest food chain in Jammu & Kashmir. It is multi-cuisine and primarily sells Kathi rolls. The menu features both vegetarian and non- vegetarian products. It also serves Biryani, pulao, desserts, salads, and beverages. Besides that, it also serves Wazwan at its selected outlets.

== History ==
The restaurant chain opened its first outlet in Srinagar, Jammu and Kashmir in October 2017. Parsa's headquarters are located in the Sarah City Centre, Srinagar.

== Outlets ==
Parsa's outlets can be found in Srinagar as well as other regions of India's Jammu and Kashmir, such as Kupwara, Baramulla, Budgam, Ganderbal, Pulwama, Bhaderwah, Jammu, Shopian, Kargil, Awantipora, Sopore, Pampore, Tral, Handwara. as well as in Leh, Delhi, Bangalore, Pune. Parsa's recently opened its outlet in Handwara, J&K. Parsa's also plans to expand in other regions of India.

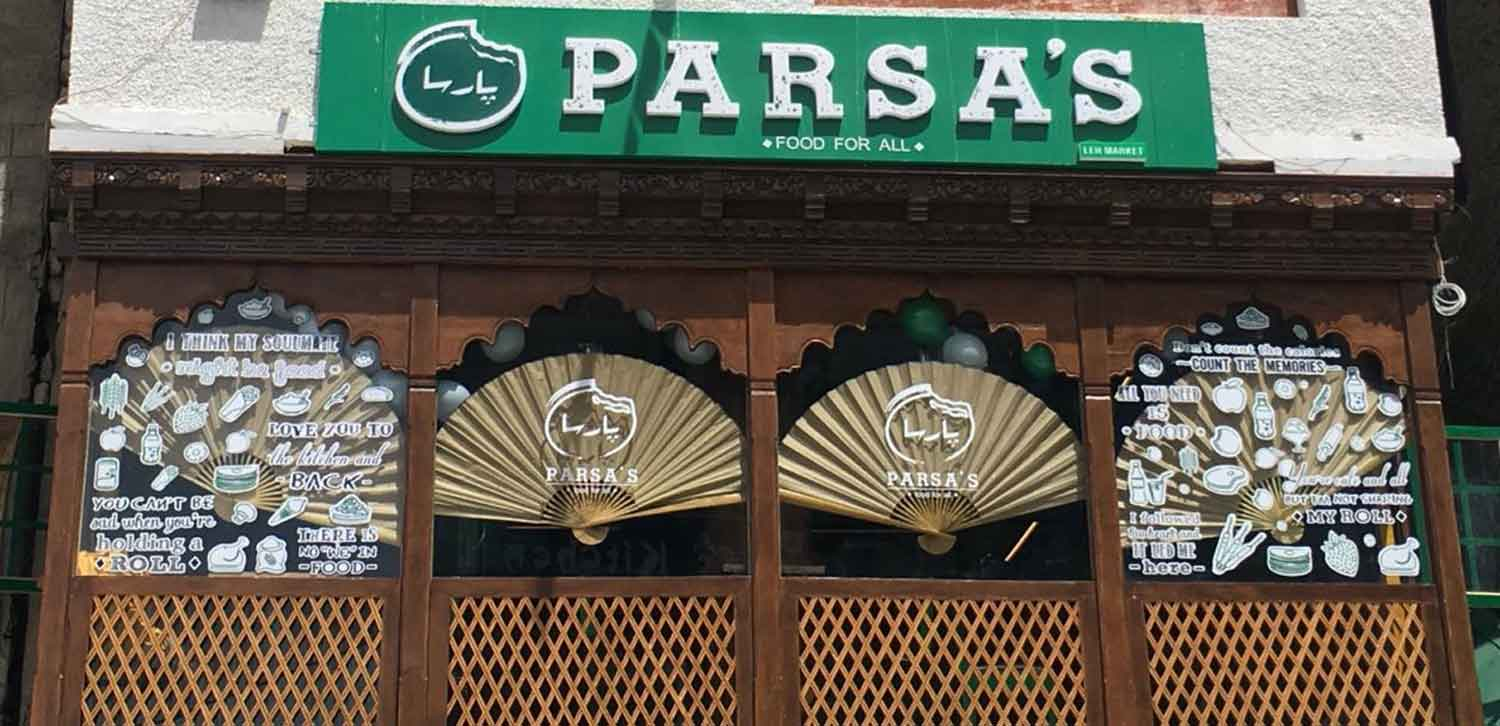
Parsa's Leh

== Book Bank ==
Parsa's hosts a collection of books of different genres donated by readers. Javid Parsa, in order to promote the reading culture across the valley, started Parsa Book Bank in 2015 to help the youth to inculcate reading habits in the times of internet and social media. Visitors to the Parsa outlets can read and borrow the books from the bank. Apart from it, Parsa Book Bank also hosts book launches of indigenous authors.

== See also ==
- Indian fast food
- Indian cuisine
- Kashmiri cuisine
- List of fast food restaurant chains
- Fast food restaurant
