= Speciality Restaurants Limited =

Indian restaurant company

- Type: Public
- Traded as: BSE: 534425, NSE: SPECIALITY
- ISIN: INE247M01014
- Industry: Food and Beverage
- Founded: 1992 in Mumbai, India
- Founder: Anjan Chatterjee
- Headquarters: Kolkata, India
- Number of locations: 25 (Mar 2015)
- Area served: India; Bangladesh; Dar es Salaam
- Key people: Anjan Chatterjee (MD); Susim Mukul Datta (Chairman)
- Production output: 135+ outlets (Feb 2020)
- Brands: Mainland China; Mainland China Asia Kitchen; Oh! Calcutta; Sigree Global Grill; Cafe Mezzuna; Sweet Bengal; Hoppipola; Sigree; Machaan; Haka; Flame & Grill; Mobifeast
- Revenue: ▲INR 307.1 crores (2014–15)
- Net income: ▼INR 9.452 crores (2014–15)
- Total equity: INR 46.96 crores (2014–15)
- Number of employees: 4,412 (Mar 2015)
- Website: www.speciality.co.in

Speciality Restaurants Limited is an Indian restaurant company that owns multiple chains of fine and casual dining restaurants in India, Bangladesh and Tanzania. Speciality Restaurants Limited also owns and operates confectionery stores. The company has its registered office in Kolkata and head office in Mumbai with presence in twenty-five cities across three countries. Speciality Restaurants Limited is listed on BSE and NSE stock exchanges of India.

== History ==
The operational history of Speciality Restaurants Limited began in 1992 when founder Anjan Chatterjee entered the restaurant industry by launching "Only Fish" in Mumbai, a boutique dining spot dedicated to Calcutta-style Bengali cuisine. This foundational restaurant was later rebranded and expanded under the "Oh! Calcutta" banner. Following the initial success, Chatterjee expanded the portfolio in 1994 by establishing "Mainland China" in Saki Naka, Mumbai. The parent company was formally incorporated as Speciality Restaurants Private Limited in 1999 before eventually going public in 2012.

In 2012, the company got listed on BSE and NSE stock exchanges of India.

== Restaurants and brands ==
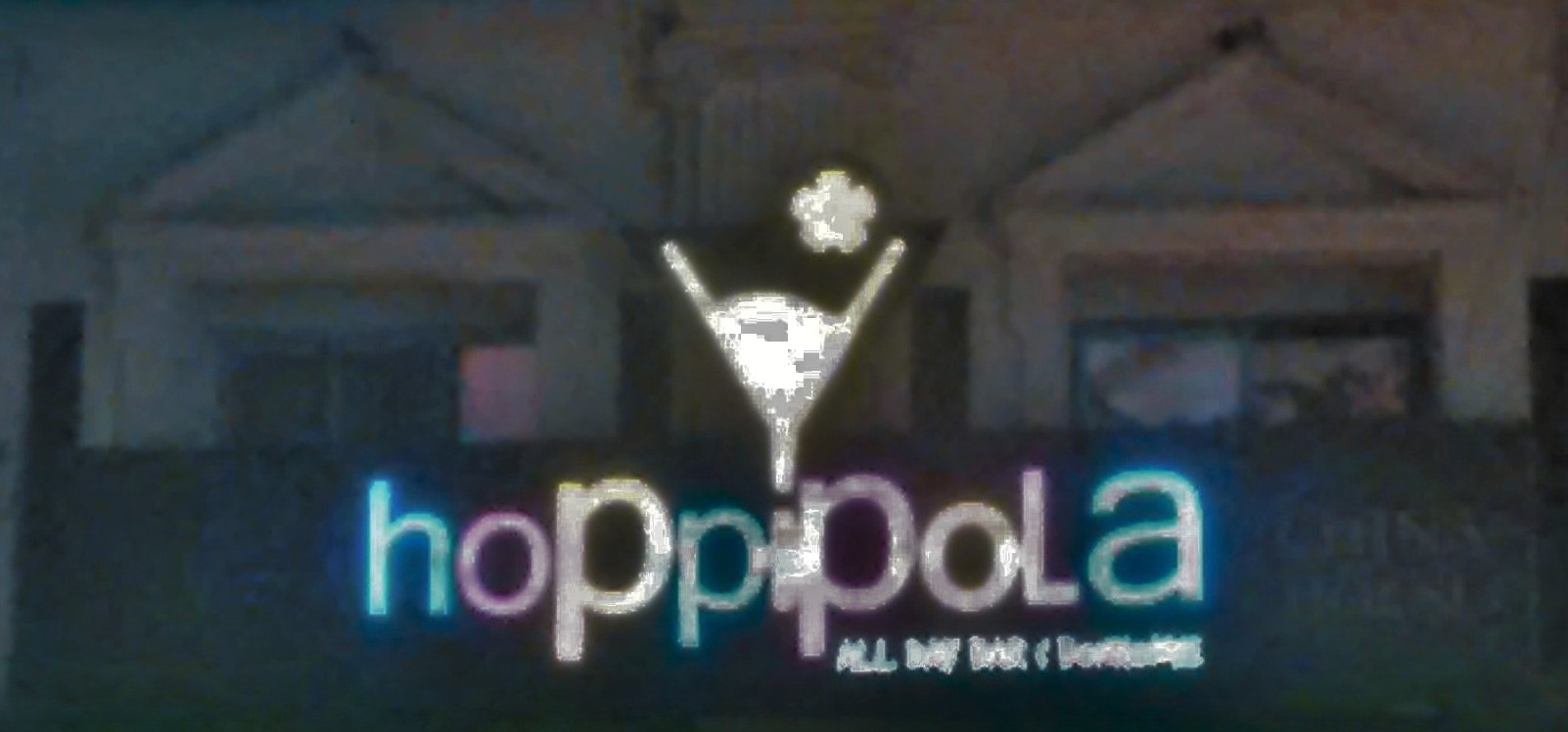
Hoppipola logo at its outlet in Galleria

Speciality Restaurants Limited owns and operates the following chains of restaurants and brands across multiple locations:

- Cafe Mezzuna: Semi-casual dining restaurant and specializes in Mediterranean, Moroccan, Spanish, French and Italian cuisines.
- Flame & Grill: Restaurant specializes in Kebabs.
- Haka: Restaurant specializes in Dim sum; a style of Cantonese cuisine.
- Hoppipola: Bar offering mostly finger food.
- Mainland China: Flagship restaurant. Restaurant offers Chinese food and has over 52 outlets.
- Mainland China Asia Kitchen: Offers cuisines from Asia, beyond Chinese.
- Mobifeast:
- Oh! Calcutta
- Sigree
- Sigree Global Grill
- Gong
- Zoodles
- Dariole
- Riyasat
- Episode One
- Hay
- Progressive Oriental House (POH)
- Sweet Bengal: Confectionery.
- Jungle Safari : Casual eatery, featuring North Indian fare plus some pizzas, and decorated in a jungle theme.
