= Screwball (disambiguation) =

A screwball is a baseball and fastpitch softball pitch.

Screwball or Screwballs may also refer to:

- Screwball (group), an American hip-hop group
- Screwball, nickname of George Beurling (1921–1948), Canada's top flying ace of the Second World War
- Screwball (ice cream), a frozen dessert
- The Screwball, a Woody Woodpecker animated cartoon short subject
- Screwballs, a 1983 Canadian comedy film
- Screwy Squirrel, also known as Screwball Squirrel, an MGM cartoon character of the 1940s
- Screwball (character), an enemy of Spider-Man in the Marvel Comics universe

== See also ==
- Screwball comedy, a film genre
- Ball screw, a mechanical linear actuator
- Ball screw or ball puller, an accessory for a musket
