= Bungalow Bar =

Former New York City ice cream brand

Bungalow Bar was a brand of ice cream sold from ice cream trucks and mini markets to consumers on the streets in the New York City boroughs of Brooklyn and Queens, Staten Island and the Bronx, as well as Washington Heights in Manhattan, in Yonkers Westchester County, Nassau County and in Deer Park (Suffolk County) during the 1950s and 1960s and early 1970's. Bungalow Bar trucks serviced the Bushwick section of Brooklyn during the 1940s. Bungalow Bar trucks had a distinctive look: white, with rounded corners, and made to look like a small, mobile bungalow topped with a dark brown shingle roof.

Bungalow Bar's competitors included the national chain Good Humor. Good Humor's ice cream on a stick sold for 10 cents, while Bungalow Bar's price was 5 cents.

Bungalow Bar inspired folklorist songs among neighborhood children, with lyrics of various iterations that included:

Bungalow Bar
Tastes like tar
Put it in a jar
And throw it far

Bungalow Bar
Tastes like tar
The more you eat
The sicker you are

Bungalow Bar
Tastes like tar
Take a bite
And spit it far

Popular in Throggs Neck:

Bungalow Bar
Tastes like tar.
They've got monkeys
In their car.

== References in popular culture ==
- In The Sopranos episode "A Hit Is a Hit", Tony Soprano, being joshed by non-Mafia individuals, asked if he ever met John Gotti, replies that he did meet Gotti once at an auction when Bungalow Bar declared bankruptcy and was auctioning off their trucks. Tony said he bid on the very last truck, but was outbid by Gotti. However Gotti was a good sport about it and gave Tony a ride home in the truck, and rang the bell the whole ride home.
