= Procrastinators' Club of America =

Club founded by Les Waas 1956

- Formation: 1956
- Founder: Les Waas
- Founded at: Philadelphia, Pennsylvania, U.S.
- Type: Club
- Location: PO Box 712, Bryn Athyn, PA 19009, USA
- Secretary-treasurer: Joseph Weiss

The Procrastinators' Club of America is based in Philadelphia, Pennsylvania, and describes its purpose as promoting "the philosophy of relaxation through putting off until later those things that needn't be done today." It was established in 1956 as a joke by Les Waas who eventually registered it as a business in Philadelphia in 1966. Waas remained the organization's president until at least 2011. Waas also worked in advertising, where he wrote the Mister Softee jingle played by its ice cream trucks as well as more than 970 other jingles.

== Membership ==
In 1987, Waas joked the club had "about a half-million members in the United States, although only about 5,000 have gotten around to joining." The club had an international membership of about 6,000 people in 1995 and 12,000 as of 2011.

The club does not appear to have a webpage. As of 1995, members could join by sending a $20 membership fee to a Philadelphia post office box, and would receive a newsletter called "Last Month's Newsletter".

== Events and protests ==
The club crowned Beth Swinand its 1956 Miss Procrastinator in November 1957. At the meeting, the club decided its Christmas party would be held in April, although it postponed choosing the exact date.

In 1966, the club held an anti-war demonstration, against the War of 1812, with signs saying "Procrastinators protest the War of 1812!" and "Dolly Bird - Tell Pres. Madison We Want Peace!". The club's newsletter announced that the protest was a success because "a treaty has now been signed."

During the United States Bicentennial, the club vowed to picket the Whitechapel Bell Foundry, who cast the Liberty Bell, with signs "We got a lemon" and "What about the warranty?" The foundry told the protesters that it would be glad to replace the bell—so long as it was returned in the original packaging.

In 1976, the club awarded the Betsy Ross Bridge in Philadelphia the "Award to Come Later" award for its long delayed opening.

In 1991, the club picketed a seafood restaurant because of its early bird special. Waas held a blank sign because he hadn't gotten around to writing anything on it.

Lester Morton "Les" Waas, the founder of the club, died in 2016 aged 94 years.

== See also ==
- National Procrastination Week
