= Jack and Jill Ice Cream =

Ice-cream company known for its trucks

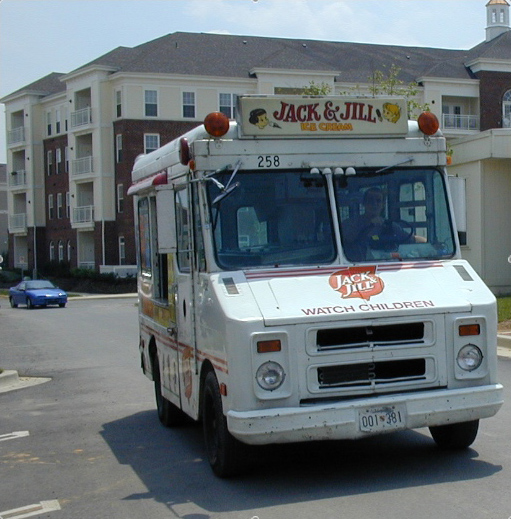
Jack and Jill Ice Cream Truck in Kentlands, Maryland

Jack and Jill Ice Cream Company was founded by Max Schwartz in 1929 in Philadelphia, Pennsylvania. Schwartz sold ice cream he carried through the streets of Philadelphia. In 1936, the company purchased its first ice cream truck for selling ice cream. In addition to trucks, the company also sells ice cream to restaurants and catering services, in stores, and in vending machines throughout the Mid-Atlantic United States. Jack and Jill is credited with creating and launching the Choco Taco in the early 1980s, which it later sold to Good Humor-Breyers.

The company is named after the "Jack and Jill" nursery rhyme and is headquartered in Moorestown, New Jersey.

== Competitors ==
- Good Humor
- Mister Softee
