= Mobile Softee =

Ice cream vendor in Hong Kong

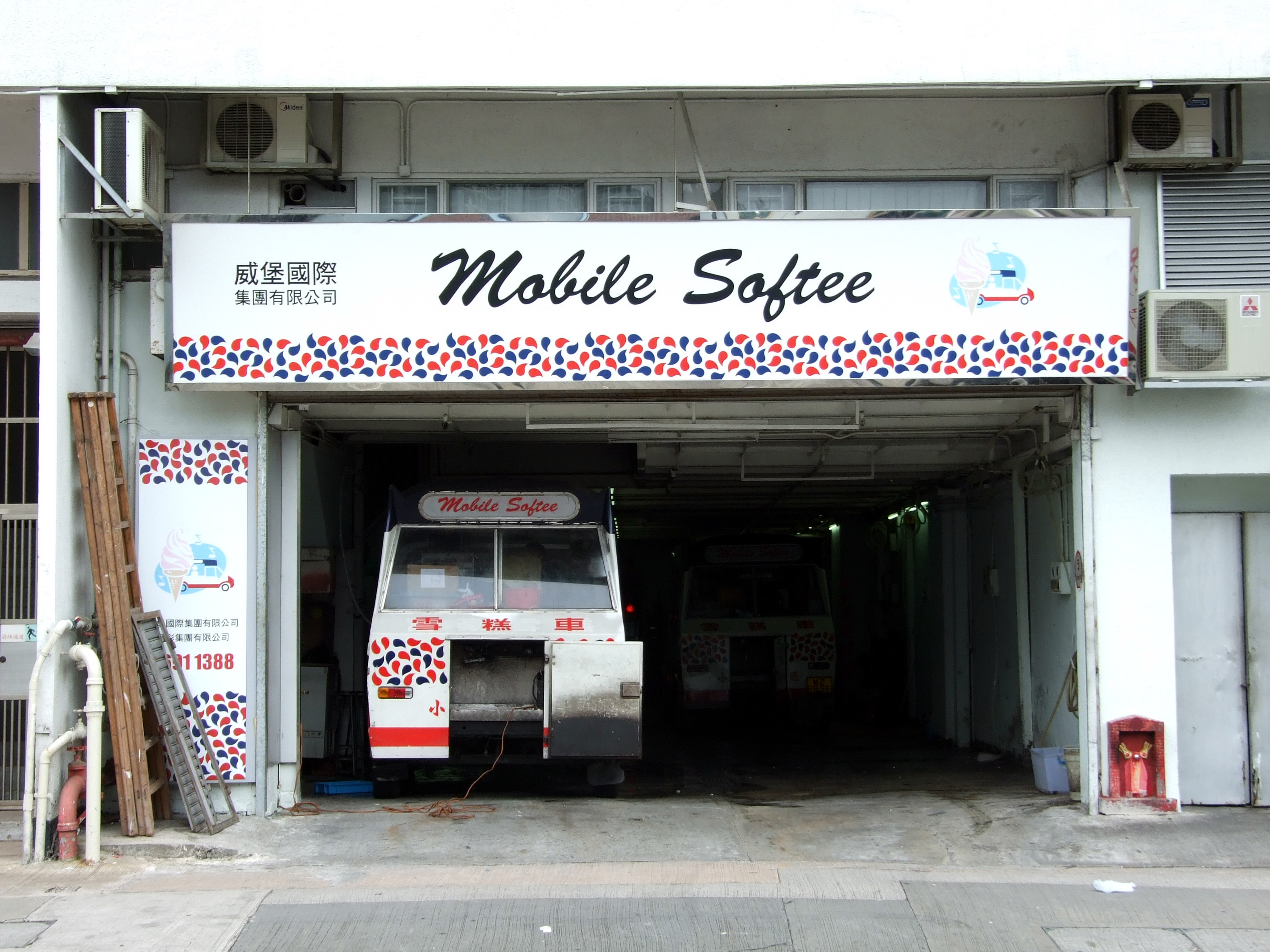
The Mobile Softee headquarters in Fo Tan

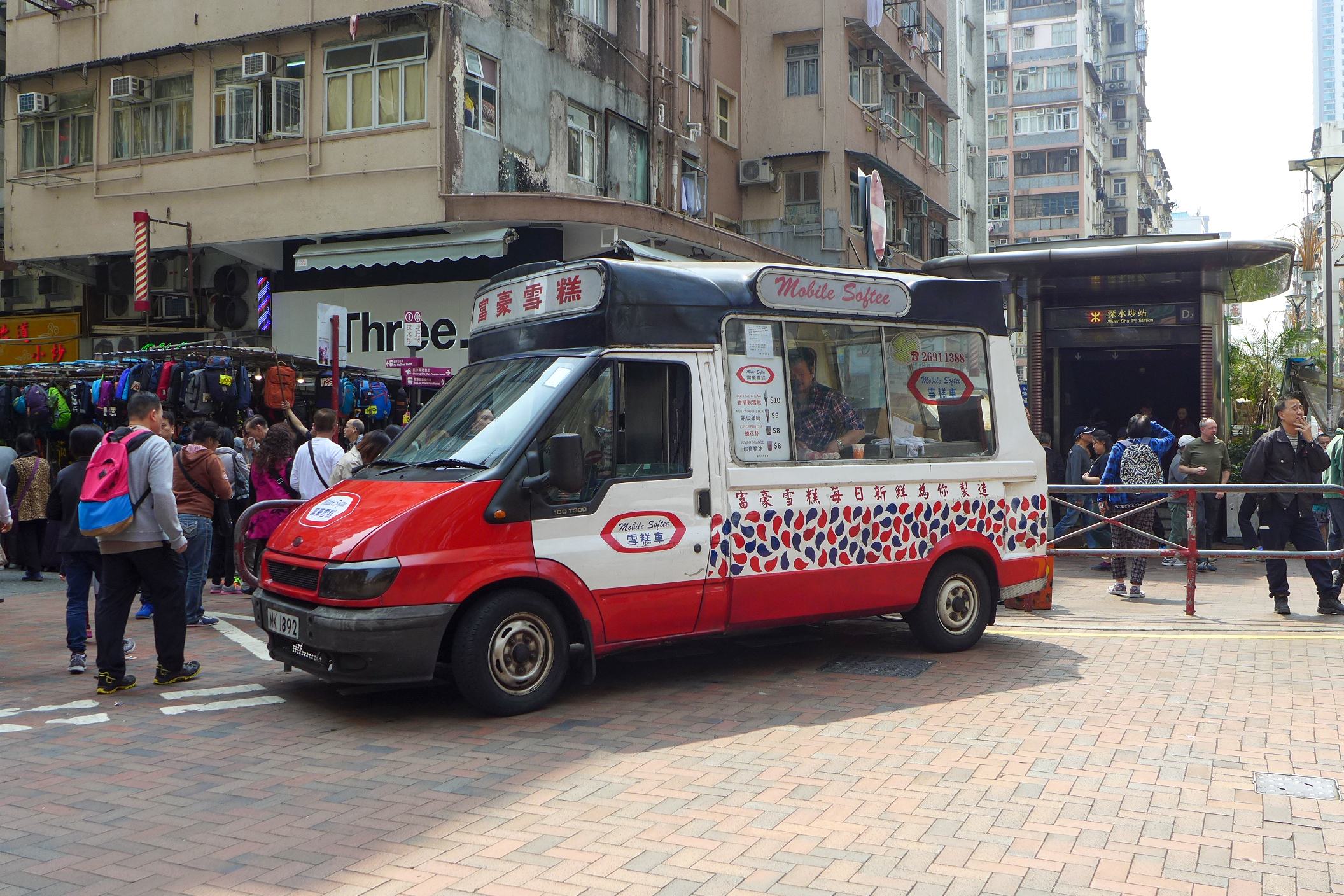
The Mobile Softee in Sham Shui Po

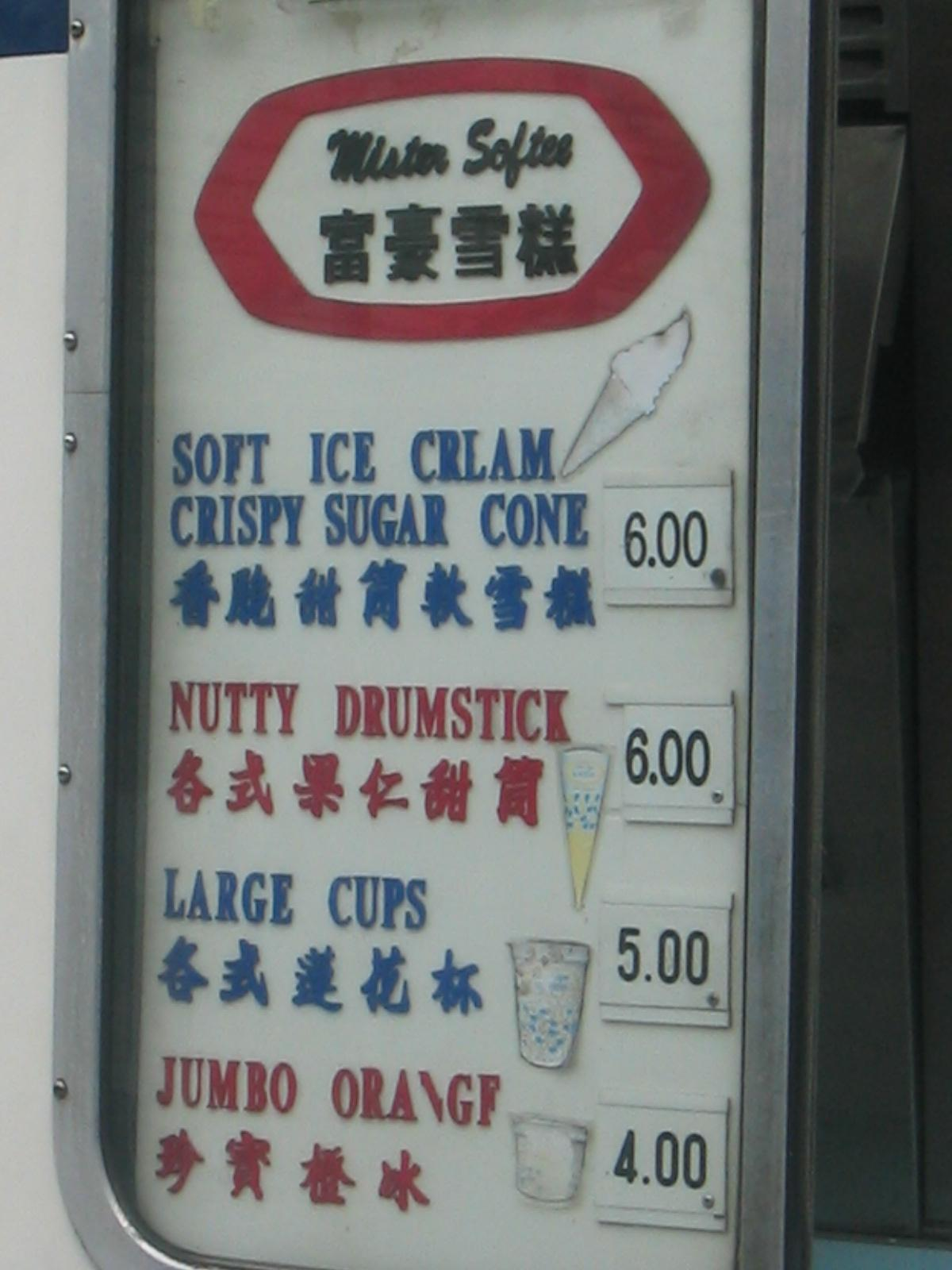
The somewhat faded menu of Mister Softee

Mobile Softee (Chinese: 雪糕車) is an ice cream vendor in Hong Kong which uses ice cream trucks. The brand is owned by Ng Enterprises Ltd.

== History ==
Ho King-yuen was inspired by the Mister Softee (富豪雪糕) trucks he saw while visiting London. When he returned from his trip, he made a plan with two of his friends to bring the brand to Hong Kong. The first truck was imported from England and began to operate in 1970 on the eve of Chinese New Year. Ho transferred the business to Ng Enterprises and immigrated to Perth, Australia, where he lived until his death on January 23, 2025 at the age of 98.

The ice cream was very cheap, with a soft serve cone selling for $0.05 when the business first opened.

The red-white-blue vans also began to be seen in Shanghai in 1994, and numbered 18 as of August 2005.

Mister Softee's Hong Kong operation was renamed to Mobile Softee in 2010 after the rights to the Mister Softee name were retracted.

== Organization ==
The headquarters of the company is located in Fo Tan.

== Vans ==
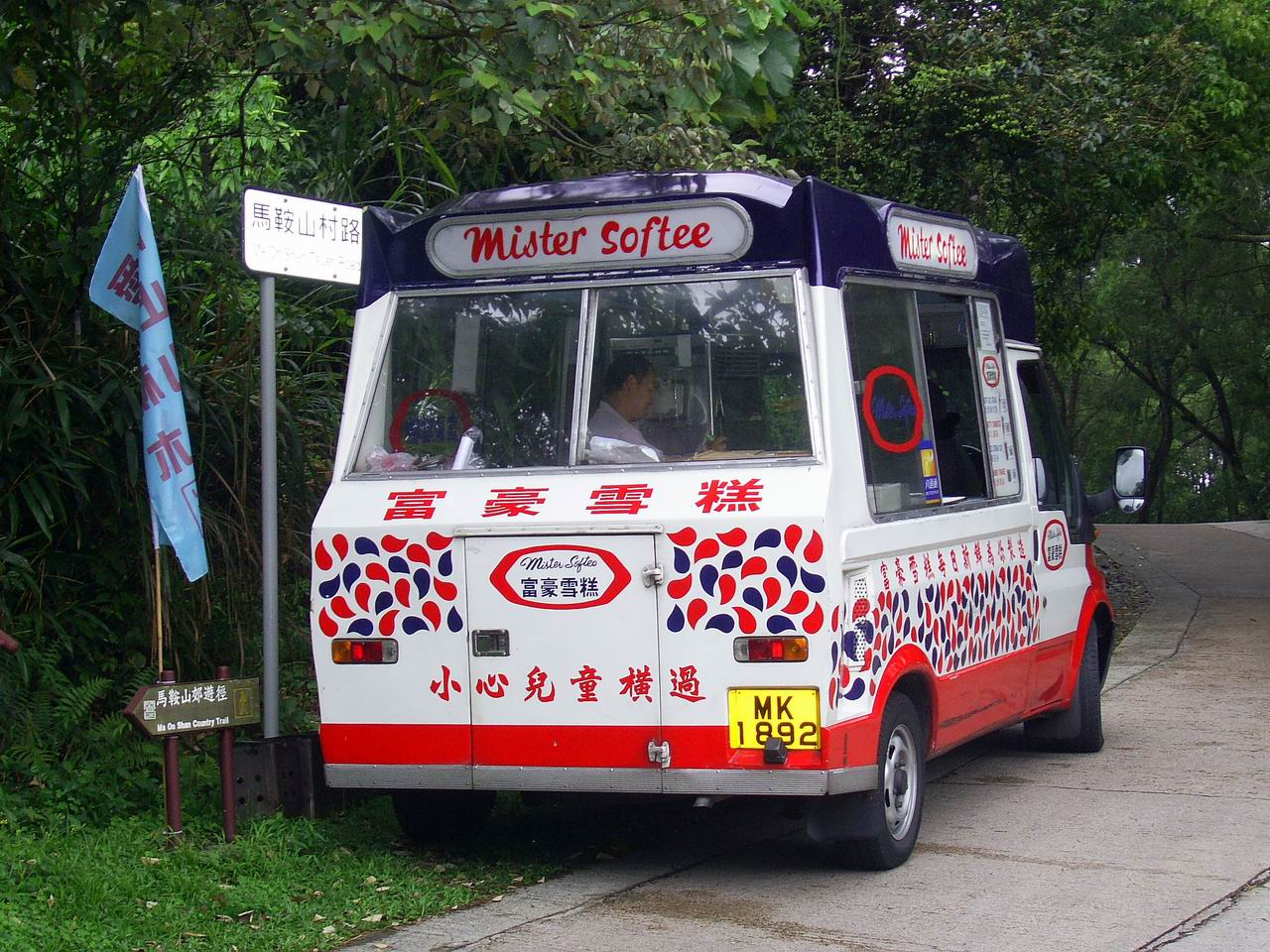
A Mister Softee ice cream truck in Ma On Shan, Hong Kong, 2008

Because the Hong Kong Government has stopped the issue of new hawking licenses since 1978, and the existing licenses cannot be transferred to other vehicles, the old trucks are still in use. The company has 14 vans running on Hong Kong Island, Kowloon and the New Territories.

Each van is painted in blue, red, and white. As required by the law, each van has a soft serve machine, a basin, and two refrigerators. The vans play The Blue Danube.

The trucks sell only four products, which have remained the same since its inception:

- soft serve ice cream
- nutty drumstick
- large cups (Chinese: 蓮花杯 "lotus cups")
- Jumbo Orange (Chinese: 珍寶橙冰), a kind of orange sherbet).

Vanilla is usually the only soft serve flavor served, but strawberry soft serve is sometimes seen around Chinese New Year.

In general, there are chances to see Mobile Softee everywhere in Hong Kong. Mobile Softee may be found near schools and train stations on weekdays, and in busy tourist districts including Tsim Sha Tsui, Mong Kok, Central, Temple Street on weekends and holidays. Golden Bauhinia Square in Wan Chai, Star Ferry Pier in Tsim Sha Tsui, and IKEA furnishings outside Sha Tin Train Station are now the locations with the highest likelihood of meeting Mobile Softee.
