= Mister Softee =

Ice cream truck franchise

Mister Softee Inc.
- Trade name: Mister Softee
- Type: Private
- Industry: Ice cream
- Founded: 1956; 70 years ago Philadelphia, Pennsylvania
- Founders: William Conway; James Conway
- Headquarters: 901 Clements Bridge Road Runnemede, New Jersey, United States
- Key people: John Conway; James Conway, Jr.
- Products: Ice cream
- Website: mistersoftee.com

Mister Softee Inc. (doing business as Mister Softee) is an American ice cream truck franchisor, best known in the northeastern United States. The company is based in Runnemede, New Jersey.

== Business history ==
Mister Softee Inc. was founded in 1956 by brothers William Aloysius Conway (1922–2004) and James Francis Conway (1927–2006) in Philadelphia, Pennsylvania. Headquartered in Runnemede, New Jersey, since 1958, Mister Softee became one of the largest franchisors of soft ice cream in the United States, with about 350 franchisees operating 625 trucks in 18 states. Around 1999, William and James' sons, John P. Conway and Jim Conway Jr., took over the business.

In 2025, a standalone Mister Softee store was opened in East Islip, New York.

=== Hong Kong ===
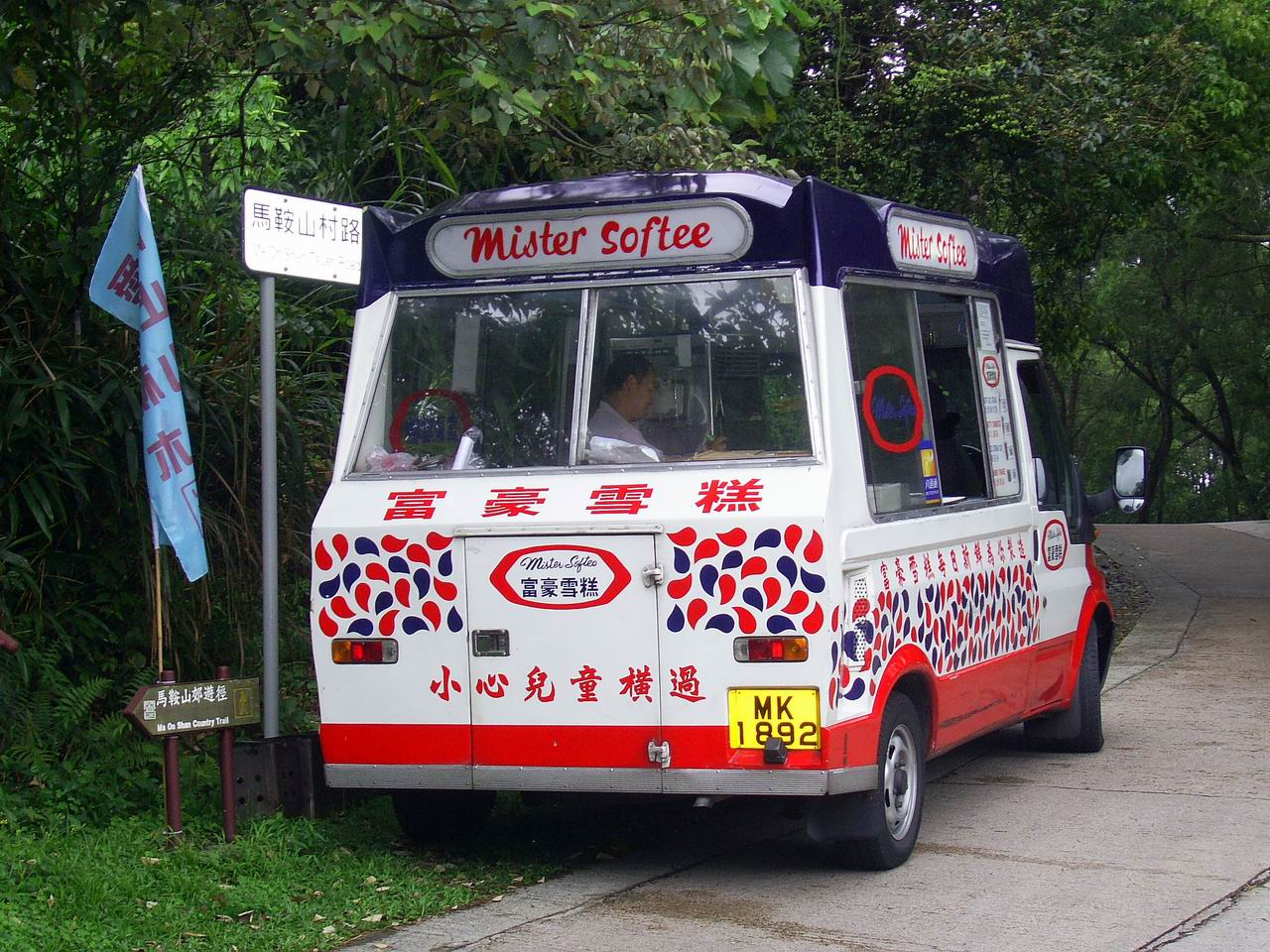
A Mister Softee ice cream truck in Ma On Shan, Hong Kong, 2008

=== China ===
English-teacher-turned-entrepreneur-now-stand-up-comedian Turner Sparks was roommates with Alex Conway – Jim Conway, Jr's. son while attending the University of Miami. Sparks spoke fluent Mandarin and had been teaching English in Suzhou. In 2007, with Alex's help, Sparks launched a Mister Softee China franchise in Suzhou with just one truck. Five years later, Sparks had ten trucks and 25 employees, with plans to expand throughout China's eastern region.

Mister Softee China had created a menu that combined classic American ice cream products of shakes, floats, and sundaes with new Chinese products such as green tea ice cream, red bean ice cream, kiwifruit sundaes, and milk tea floats. While its American counterpart operated almost exclusively with trucks, Mister Softee China had kiosks in downtown shopping areas and trucks throughout China's suburban neighborhoods and business districts.

Mister Softee suspended its China operations in 2016.

=== Trademark infringement cases in New York ===
Mister Softee has defended its trademarks, notably in the following two cases:

- Dimitrios Tsirkos, who until 2014 had for decades been a Mister Softee franchisee in New York, launched a competing ice cream vending company, which was incorporated January 24, 2014, in New York under the name Master Softee Inc., and, among other things, used Mister Softee's jingle. Mister Softee, in 2014, sued Tsirkos in U.S. District Court for the Southern District of New York and prevailed on three allegations: (i) breach of franchise agreements, (ii) trademark infringement, and (iii) other unfair business practices. In 2016, U.S. District Judge Laura Taylor Swain held Tsirkos in contempt for failing to begin payments on a $97,000 judgment handed down in the 2014 case.
- The next year, Mister Softee won, by default, a Federal lawsuit against Dimitrios Konstantakakos and 3 DDD Ice Inc. – owner of New York Ice Cream Truck Inc. of Long Island City – preventing him from using Mister Softee's jingle.

With respect to defending the trademarks, Mister Softee vice president Jim Conway has stated, "For 58 years we've spent our time, energy, and money developing brands. We're one of the most recognized brands. The people who are infringing on our trademark are not only hurting Mr. Softee, but also hurting our mom and pop franchisees. We take these actions to protect them as much to protect our own brand."

== Jingle ==
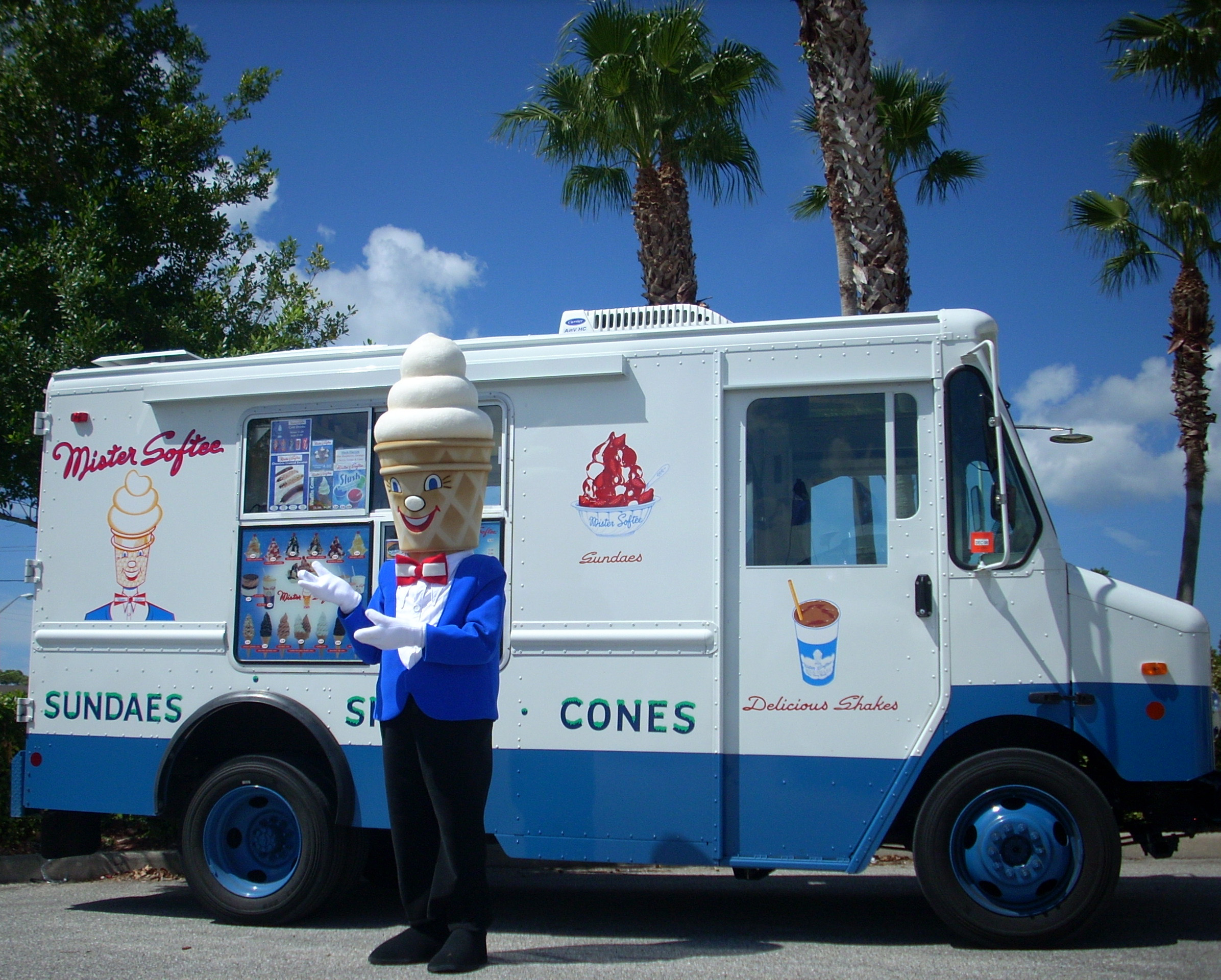
Mister Softee mascot and official truck at an event in Tampa, Florida

The melody broadcast from Mister Softee trucks – bearing the likeness of a music-box – was composed by Philadelphia ad man, Les Waas (né Lester Morton Waas; 1921–2016) (Note: Les Waas, in 1956, founded the Procrastinators' Club of America, and served as its president until 2011. Waas had been a member of the Broadcast Pioneers of Philadelphia for five decades, having served as President, then Chairman of the Board. He had been on its Board of Directors for over four decades, longer than any other member that proceeded him. On November 18, 2005, Waas was inducted into the Broadcast Pioneers of Philadelphia's "Hall of Fame." ("Les Waas," Marquis Who's Who, online; OCLC 4778551075)) who titled it, "Jingle and Chimes." Waas created close to 1,000 jingles. The melody is in E-flat major (though trucks play it almost a semitone sharper and thus sound closer to E major) and is based on Arthur Pryor's 1905 composition, "The Whistler and His Dog", thus being in six-eight time.

Michael Bloomberg, while Mayor of New York, launched an ambitious initiative in 2002 to crack-down on city noise, which included jingles broadcast from ice cream trucks – and in particular, the jingle from Mister Softee trucks. In 2005, in the face of opposition from citizens and members of the City Council, he compromised. Rather than banning mobile jingles, he permitted the trucks to air them, but only while in transit.

== Doug Quattlebaum ==
In June 1961, Doug Quattlebaum, an American Piedmont blues guitarist, singer and songwriter, was "re-discovered" playing popular and blues songs through the public address system of his Mister Softee ice cream van. The blues historian, Pete Welding, who became known for discovering talent in unusual places, heard his performances and arranged for him to record an album. Released by Bluesville Records, Softee Man Blues (1963) had a photograph of Quattlebaum in his ice cream uniform on its front cover.

== In popular culture ==
- In the 2016 film Captain America: Civil War, a younger Tony Stark is wearing a white Mister Softee shirt.

== See also ==
- Good Humor
- Jack and Jill Ice Cream
- Mobile Softee in Hong Kong
- Mr. Whippy in the United Kingdom
- Cool Whip
