= David J. Mahoney =

American CEO and philanthropist

David Joseph Mahoney Jr. (May 17, 1923 – May 1, 2000) was an American CEO and author.

== Early life and education ==
David Joseph Mahoney Jr. was born of first generation Irish–American parents in the Throgs Neck section of the Bronx, New York. His father, David Mahoney Sr., was a construction crane operator. Mahoney's mother, Loretta Cahill, was a telephone operator with New York Bell.

Mahoney attended the Wharton School of Finance and Commerce at the University of Pennsylvania on a basketball scholarship. His studies were interrupted by the onset of World War II. He served in the Army, beginning as a private and being promoted to captain in the infantry three years later. He was stationed in Okinawa, Japan after the end of the war. After service, he worked at the Ruthraff and Ryan Ad Agency's Manhattan office while resuming studies at Wharton. He received his bachelor's degree from the University of Pennsylvania.

== Career ==
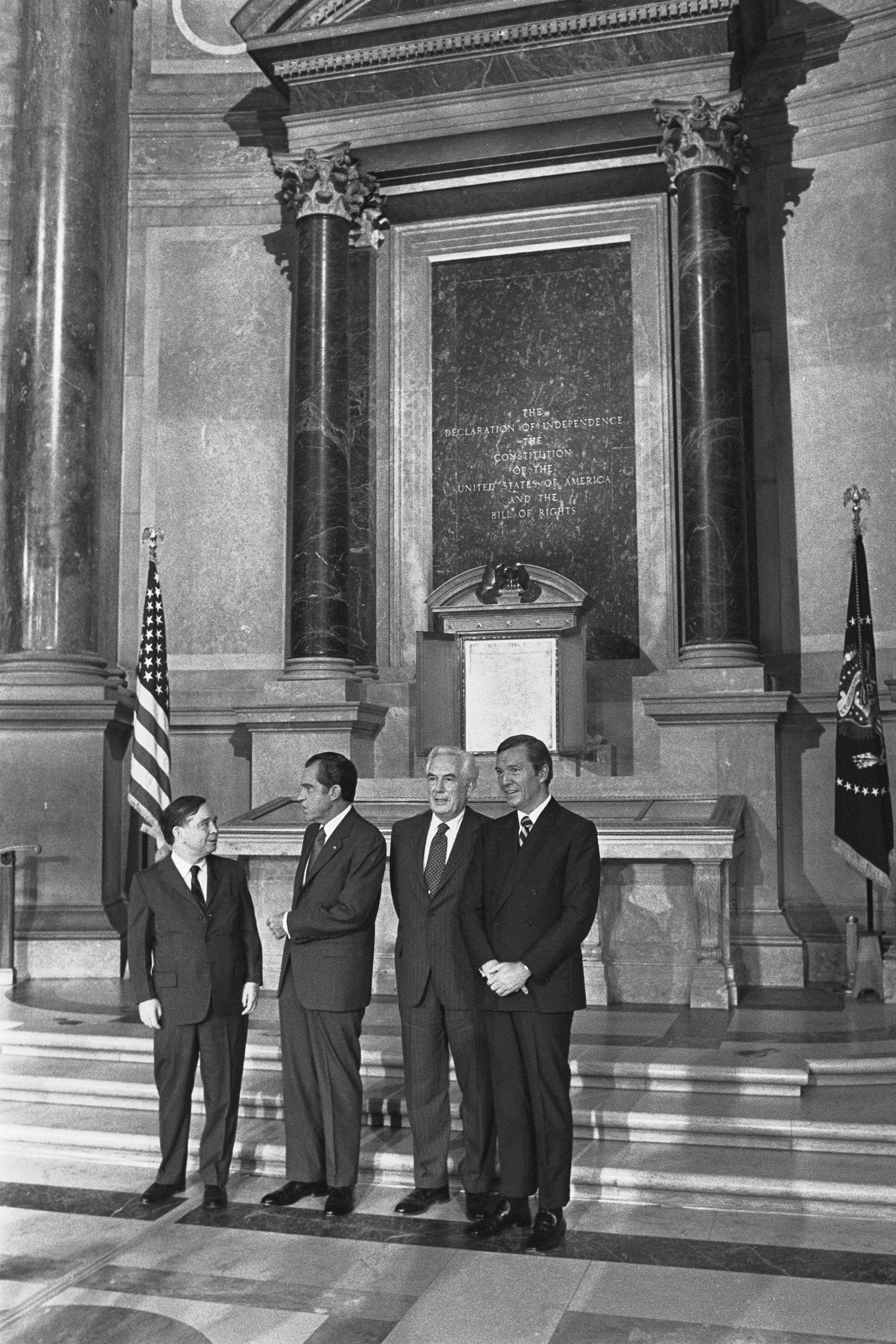
President Richard Nixon, Speaker of the House Carl Albert, Chief Justice Warren Burger, and David Mahoney, Chairman of the Bicentennial Commission at the National Archives in 1971.

Mahoney was hired as an account executive at Ruthraff and Ryan. In 1951 he went into business for himself, forming an advertising agency, David J. Mahoney, Inc. The company managed advertising for eight companies, including Noxzema, White Rock and Good Humor. Mahoney sold his agency in 1956 and became president of Good Humor.

In 1961 Mahoney was appointed executive vice president of Colgate-Palmolive, and became president of Canada Dry in 1966. The following year, Norton Simon, Inc. was formed with the consolidation of Canada Dry, Hunts Food and Industries and the McCall Corporation; Mahoney was appointed president and chief operating officer as one of three people who managed the company. He was its first president and chief executive officer, and became chairman in 1970.

In 1970, Mahoney was appointed by U.S. President Nixon as chairman of the American Revolution Bicentennial Commission.

== Public health ==
By 1977 Mahoney became chairman of the Dana Foundation, and refocused the organization mainly on neuroscience. He founded the Dana Alliance for Brain Initiatives, a foundation organization of about 190 neuroscientists, with the purpose of educating the public about their field. He endowed programs in neuroscience at Harvard and at the University of Pennsylvania, and sat on the board of advisors of the David Mahoney Institute of neurological sciences at the University of Pennsylvania. He served as chairman of the governing council of the Harvard-Mahoney Neuroscience Institute at Harvard Medical School.

== Personal life ==
Mahoney was married to model Barbara "Bobbie" Ann Moore, and the couple had two children. He later married model Hildegarde "Hillie" Merrill, the former Mrs. Arthur C. Merrill, who had two sons from her previous marriage.

== Death ==
Mahoney died on May 1, 2000, at his home in Palm Beach, Florida, of heart failure at the age of 76.

== Portrayals ==
Mahoney is played by Bill Pullman on the miniseries Halston.

== Publications ==
- Confessions of a Street-Smart Manager (with Richard Conarroe). Foreword by William Safire. ISBN 9780671625368.
- The Longevity Strategy: How to Live to 100 Using the Brain-Body Connection (with Richard Restak, M.D.). Foreword by William Safire. ISBN 9780471327943.

== Awards ==
- Congressional Medal of Honor Society National Patriots Award (1972)
- Joseph P. Wharton Business Statesman Award (1972)
- Horatio Alger Award (1977)
- Fund for Higher Education Flame of Truth Award (1980)
- Lasker-Bloomberg Public Service Award (2000)
