= Michael J. Meehan =

American stock trader (1891–1948)

Michael J. Meehan (1891–1948) was a stock trader on Wall Street during the 1920s and 1930s. The Securities and Exchange Commission (SEC) forced him out of trading in 1935 as the first individual they prosecuted. During the Great Depression he purchased a controlling stake in the Good Humor ice cream company.

== Background ==
Meehan was born in Blackburn, England in 1892, but grew up in Manhattan. After attending public schools in New York, he became a theater ticket seller on Wall Street. As a ticket broker in New York's financial district, brokers requested the best Broadway seats available. After six years as a ticket broker, Meehan used his connections to get himself a seat on the New York Curb Exchange. Three years later he had saved $90,000 to purchase a seat on the New York Stock Exchange (NYSE).

== Good Humor ==
Meehan was an early investor in the Good Humor ice cream company. In what some call nothing more than a favor, he invested in the company as a favor to an old friend, the father-in-law of the franchise own, Tom Brimer. During the stock market Crash of 1929, when most other stocks lost their value, Good Humor paid high dividends. This brought the company to the attention of Meehan and he purchased a controlling stake in the company.

== SEC fraud ==
In 1935, Meehan planned to manipulate the stock price of Bellanca Aircraft. Meehan used the strategy of 'matched orders' which had him manipulating the volume of the stock by frequently buying and selling the issue. By increasing the volume, Meehan believed he could generate interest in the company. Within a few months, the public had followed Meehan into Bellanca and pushed the share price up from $1.75 to $5.50. After Meehan completed his manipulation and sold the stock, the shares fell to their original price. The Securities and Exchange Commission (SEC) decided to prosecute Meehan under the new Securities Exchange Act. This would be the first punitive action taken by the SEC. The commission expelled Meehan from his seats on the NYSE, and also on the Curb Exchange and Chicago Board of Trade.
