= Mr. Whippy (United Kingdom) =

Brand of soft-mix ice cream in the UK

- Type: Company and franchise
- Industry: Food; Retail; Direct service
- Founded: 1958; 68 years ago
- Founder: Dominic Facchino
- Headquarters: United Kingdom
- Key people: Peter Woodhams
- Parent: The Magnum Ice Cream Company

Mr. Whippy (or Mister Whippy) is a brand of soft-mix ice cream produced by the Magnum Ice Cream Company. Mr. Whippy began as a franchise of ice cream operators, but is now just the name of the soft-mix ice cream. The ice cream vans branded as "Mr. Whippy" are authorised licensees which sell the soft-mix ice cream. Actual franchises of the brand continue separately in Australia and New Zealand.

Mr. Whippy has become a well-known trademark in the United Kingdom as it is popular amongst consumers and widely sold, commonly served in a single cone.

== History ==
The company originated when British businessman Dominic Facchino visited the United States and saw the Mister Softee ice cream franchise, selling soft serve ice cream from mobile ice cream vans. Unable to license the brand in the UK, Facchino set up his own Mr. Whippy franchise in Birmingham in 1958, starting with a fleet of six vans.

The company was purchased by Unilever in 1966.

The packaging for the Mr. Whippy mix, as purchased by vendors

=== International ===
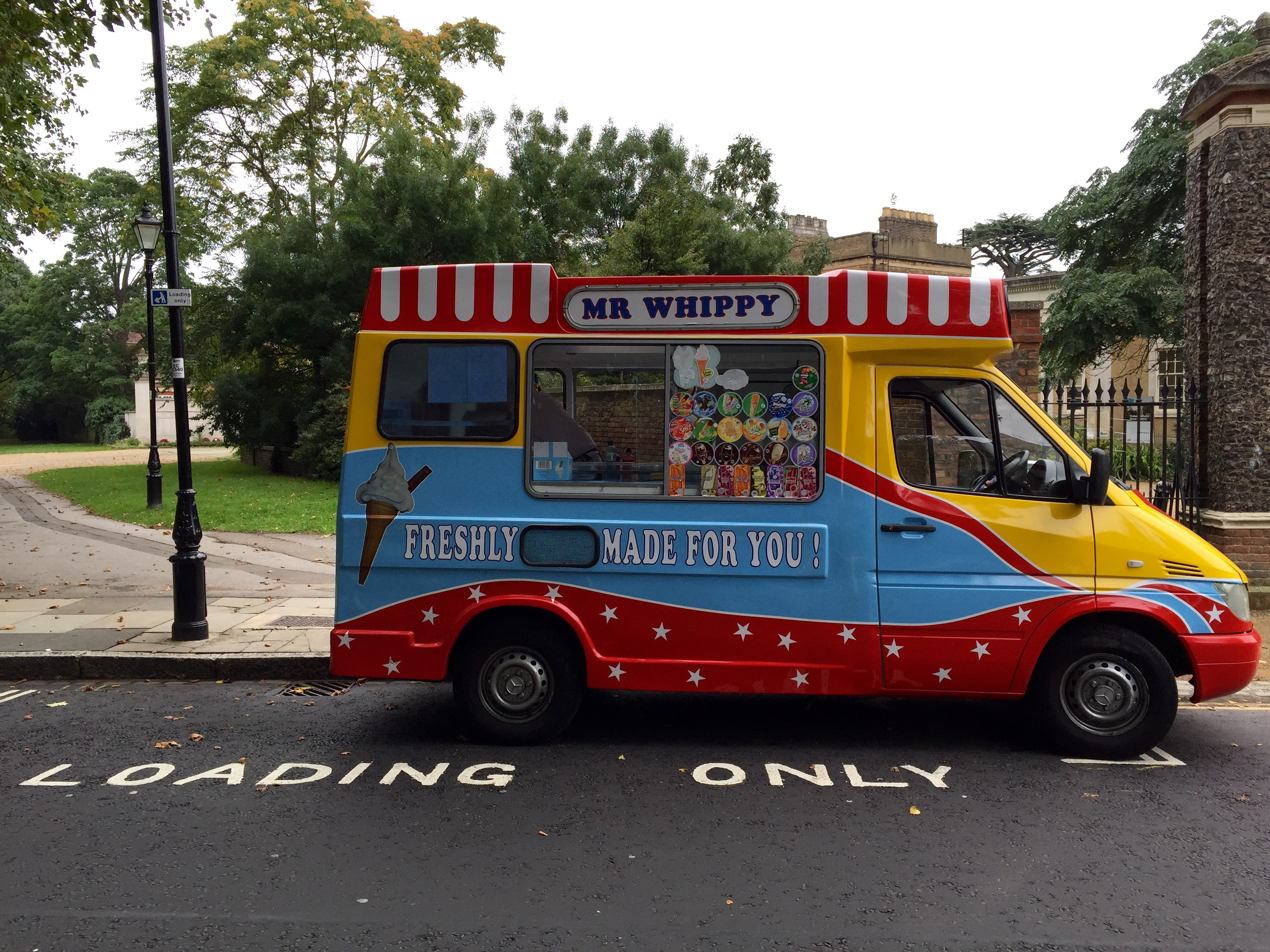
An example of a Mr. Whippy ice cream van, using the brand name on the vehicle, whilst choosing custom vehicle branding and stylisation.

The company franchised internationally to Australia in 1962 by sending ten vans on a ship from Southampton to Sydney. Following success, a second batch was sent the following year, consisting of twenty-four vans. Following great success in Australia, Facchino decided to also franchise in New Zealand, sending twenty-four vans over. During the franchise period from Mr. Whippy in the UK, around two hundred Commer Karrier vans were exported from the United Kingdom to Australia, and fifty Austins were exported to New Zealand. The company also franchised for a brief time on the Spanish island of Mallorca.

The company's franchise in Australia continued until the mid-1970s, after which the physical vehicle fleet was renamed and sold to several private operators. In 1982, the trademark "Mr. Whippy" was registered in Australia by ice cream parlour company Mr. Whippy Pty Ltd. Today, the Franchised Food Company owns the brand.

General Foods Limited (subsequently Tip Top) acquired the master rights for New Zealand in the early 1980s. The Isuzu Elf became the standard Mr. Whippy van and an orange and white colour scheme replaced the original pink and white. In early 2000, Tip Top sold the master franchise to Peter Woodhams, the Waikato Mr. Whippy franchisee, who in turn sold the master franchise to Flying Kiwi Holdings (a business owned and run by Nick Cairns, Scot and Geliana Graham) in 2006. The Mr. Whippy vans became modernised, using Ford Transit and Fiat Ducato models. Tatua replaced Fonterra Brands NZ as the provider of the Mr. Whippy UHT ice cream mix.

== See also ==
- Mister Softee
- Cool Whip
