= Harry Burt =

American confectioner

Harry B. Burt (1875 – 1926) was an American confectioner who developed the ice-cream novelty known as the Good Humor bar. Burt is widely credited with revolutionalizing manufacturing, marketing, and distribution techniques for ice-cream products.

== Product innovation ==
In 1920, when Burt was operating an ice-cream parlor and confectioner business in downtown Youngstown, he developed a chocolate coating that was "compatible" with ice cream. According to testimony provided by his widow more than a decade after his death, Burt came up with the idea of inserting a wooden stick into a chocolate-covered bar of ice cream in either 1920 or 1921. This was at least a year before the appearance of the Good Humor bar's closest relative, the Eskimo Pie.

On January 30, 1922, Burt applied for patents that would cover the process and manufacturing apparatus as well as the product itself. In October 1923, he was granted patents for both the process and manufacturing equipment, but not for the product. This development opened the way for legal battles during the years to come.

== Marketing innovations ==
In his campaign to promote the Good Humor bar, Burt established himself as a trailblazer in the emerging areas of branding and marketing. An article in The U.S. National Archives & Records Administration states: "At a time when standardization of products was relatively unknown, Burt wanted to create a national brand name product that would retain the same ingredients and flavor in all markets". Burt not only standardized production of the Good Humor bar, itself, he also developed a novel means of getting his product to potential customers. Emulating the tactics of "old-time street vendors", he introduced the Good Humor truck, which was a fixture in American neighborhoods until the 1970s.

== Legal battles and aftermath ==
In the spring of 1925, Burt became aware of the growing popularity of other frozen confections on a stick. That summer, Good Humor filed suit against the Citrus Products Company and Popsicle Corporation. Negotiations with the Citrus Products Company to secure a license from Good Humor broke down, and Good Humor voluntarily dismissed its suit in 1926, over the opposition of Citrus, who wanted the case to continue to determine the validity and scope of the Good Humor patent.

Burt's widow sold the rights to the Good Humor brand some time after her husband's death in 1926. Burt's son, Harry B. Burt Jr., kept an Oklahoma franchise for Good Humor and went on to found the Malt-A-Plenty dairy drink.

In 2006, the building in downtown Youngstown where Burt created the Good Humor Bar was honored in Parade magazine as one of the places that helped shape America's history and culture.

== Historical site ==
The site of Burt's former candy and ice-cream factory in Youngstown is currently being transformed into a regional history center. In 2008, the Mahoning Valley Historical Society purchased the building from the Ross Radio Company, which had owned the structure since 1935, when Burt's widow sold the property to James Ross. That same year, William Lawson, director of the MVHS, launched a fundraising campaign for the project, with the goal of raising $6 million. It is on the National Register of Historic Places for Mahoning County as the Burt Building.
