= Hjem-IS =

Danish ice cream company

Danish logo of Hjem-IS

Swedish logo of Hemglass

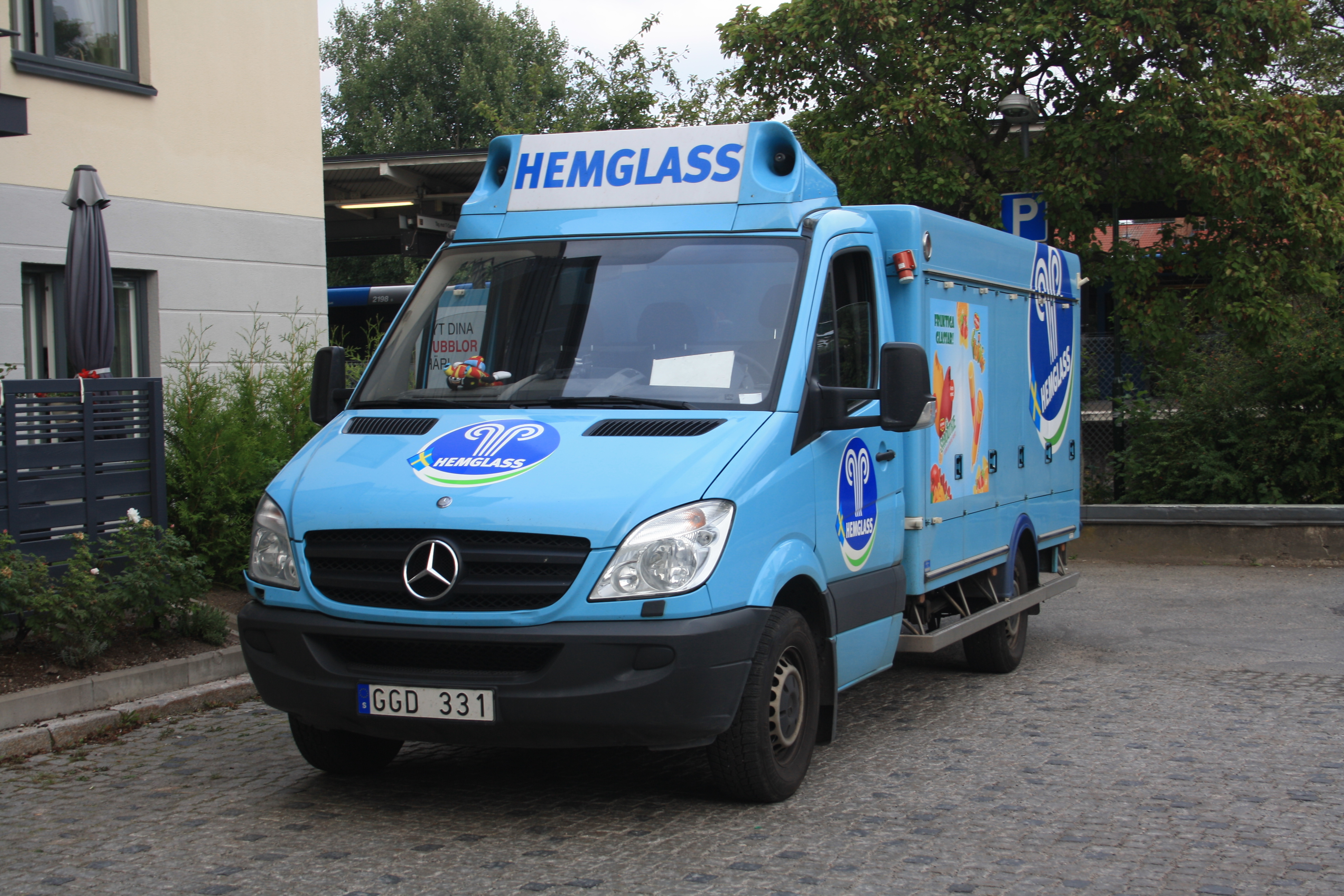
Hemglass' ice cream van in Sweden

Hjem-IS (Denmark and Norway), Hemglass (Sweden) or Kotijäätelö (Finland), all meaning "Home Ice Cream", is a Nordic brand of ice cream. It is known for its distribution system, being delivered to people's homes by its light blue ice cream vans and selling ice creams by the box, in contrast to ice cream vans other places in the world. In Sweden, the van has a signature tune that is similar, but not identical to the Laurel and Hardy theme music; in Denmark, it rings a bell.

Hemglass was founded by the Swedish Eric Ericsson in 1968. It spread its activities to other countries, establishing itself in Denmark in 1976, and in Norway and Finland in 1993. A parent company, Hjem-IS Europa A/S, existed from 1991 to 2008, and was headquartered in Kolding, Denmark. The company also operated in the United Kingdom in certain regions from at least 1989 until the early 2000s.

The group was a subsidiary of Nestlé from 2002 until 31 December 2013, when Nestlé sold the Danish, Norwegian and Swedish divisions to three different companies. The Finnish division has been closed The Swedish part, Hemglass, was sold to Varsego Sverige AB. In 2014, The Norwegian division was over by Isbjørn Is. Hjem-IS Denmark was sold to a group of 4 investors at no cost, merging it with their company Viking Is. The combined entity was later sold to ice cream maker Premier Is, also a former Nestlé subsidiary and now owned by Food Union, in 2017.
