= Screwball (ice cream) =

Type of frozen confection

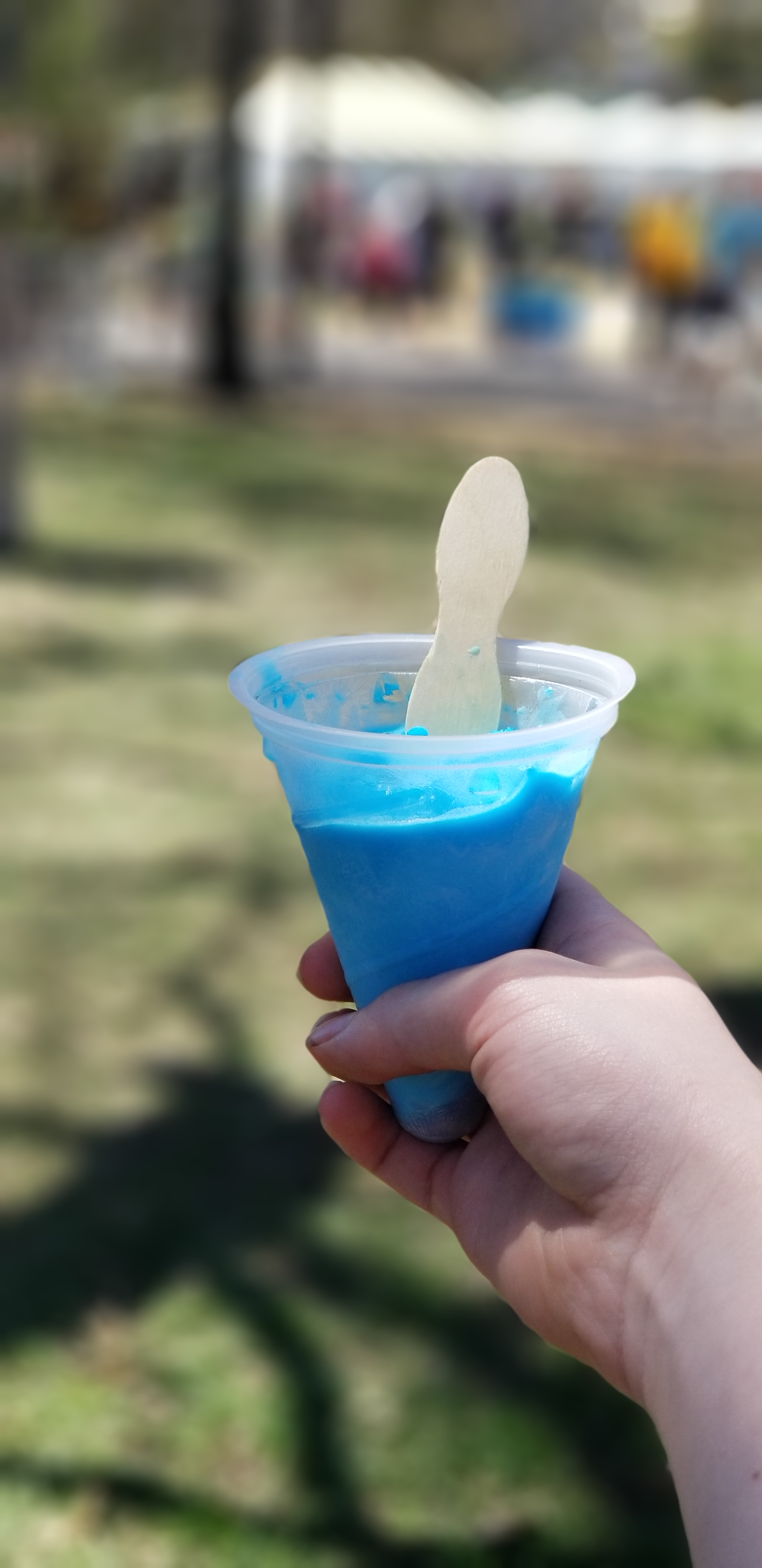
- Blue Raspberry flavored screwball
- Type: Ice cream

A screwball is a type of frozen confection that first appeared in the 1970s. It consists of ice cream inside a conical, plastic cup with a gumball at the bottom. The name was originally a commercial product name but is now a generic trademark used to describe all such ice cream treats.

== Description ==
A screwball is a type of frozen confection. It consists of ice cream inside a conical, plastic cup with a gumball at the bottom.

== History ==
The dessert originated in the 1970s. In the US, it was served from ice cream trucks.

== Brands ==
The name was originally a commercial product name but is now used to describe all such ice cream treats, whoever makes them. Several prominent brands produce screwballs, including Asda, Popsicle, and Eskimo Pie. "Two Ball Screwball" is a Good Humor brand name (and a registered trademark in the US) for a screwball containing two gumballs.

== Flavors ==
In the UK, a common flavor of the ice cream is raspberry ripple. The original flavor of Two Ball Screwball was cherry, but other flavors have been introduced, including blue raspberry.
