= Good Humor =

Ice cream brand / frozen treat brand

- Product type: Ice cream brand
- Current owner: Good Humor-Breyers (The Magnum Ice Cream Company)
- Country: Youngstown, Ohio, U.S.
- Introduced: 1920; 106 years ago
- Markets: United States
- Previous owners: Good Humor Corporation of America
- Website: www.goodhumor.com

Good Humor is a Good Humor-Breyers brand of ice cream started by Harry Burt in Youngstown, Ohio, United States, in the early 1920s with the Good Humor bar, a chocolate-coated ice cream bar on a stick sold from ice cream trucks and retail outlets. It was a fixture in American popular culture in the 1950s when the company operated up to 2,000 "sales cars".

== History ==
The original Good Humor company started in Youngstown, Ohio, during the early 1920s and covered most of the country by the mid-1930s. In 1961, Good Humor was acquired by Thomas J. Lipton, the U.S. subsidiary of the international Unilever conglomerate. Profits declined when the baby boomers aged and costs increased because of labor issues, gasoline, and insurance. The company sold its fleet in 1978 but continued to distribute its products through grocery stores and independent street vendors. By 1984, Good Humor had returned to profitability. Starting in 1989, Unilever expanded Good Humor through its acquisition of Gold Bond Ice Cream, which included the Popsicle brand. Four years later, Unilever bought Isaly Klondike and the Breyers Ice Cream Company. As a result, Good Humor-Breyers became a large producer of branded ice cream and frozen novelties, as part of the international Unilever Heartbrand.

=== 1920s: Burt Family and Midland Food ===
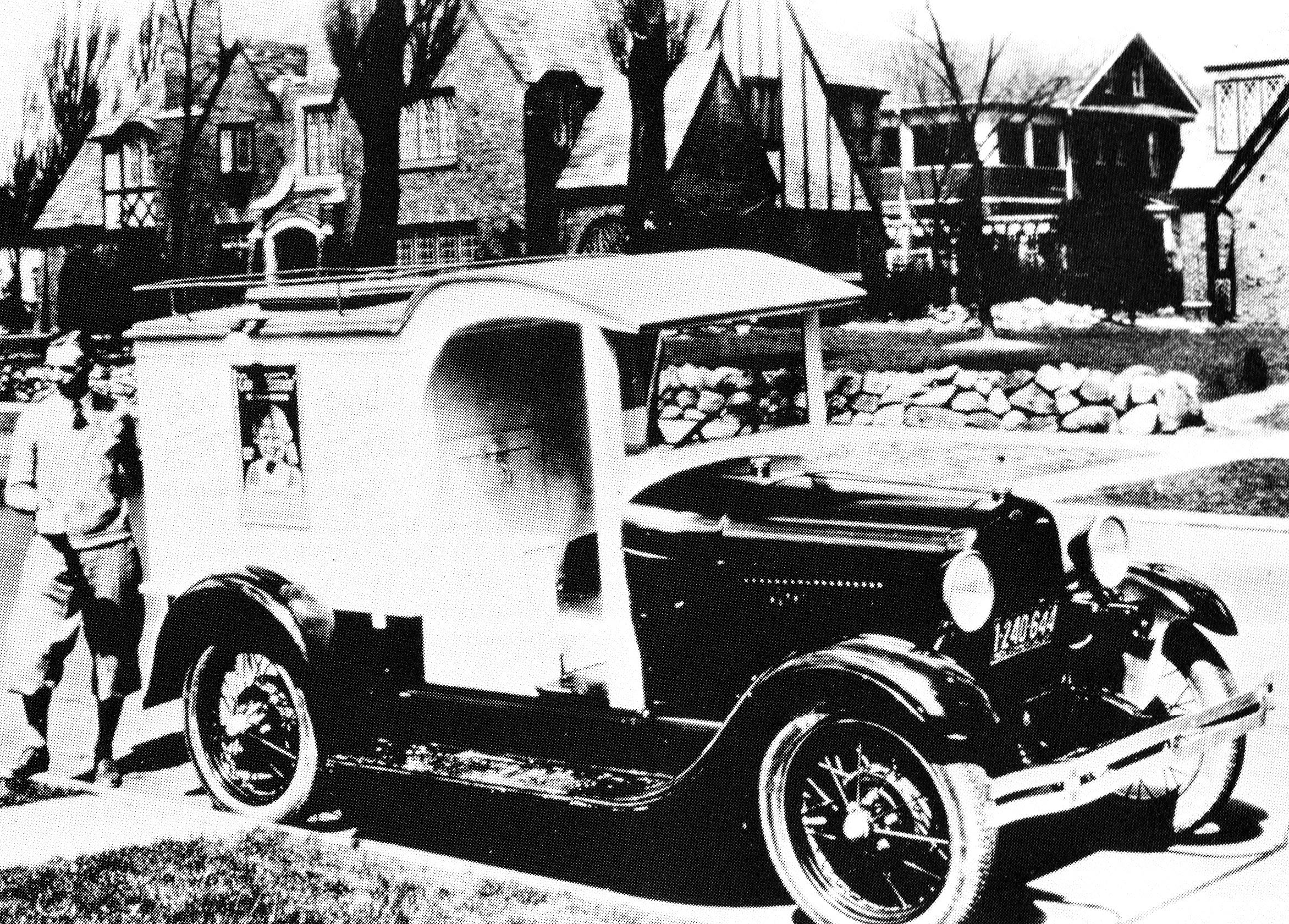
An early Good Humor truck, a.k.a. "sales car"

In 1919, Christian Nelson, an Iowa store owner, discovered how to coat an ice cream bar with chocolate, inventing the Eskimo Pie. When he heard of the discovery, Harry Burt (1875–1926), owner of a Youngstown, Ohio, ice cream parlor, replicated Nelson's product. The story is that Burt's 23-year-old daughter Ruth thought that the new novelty tasted good but was too messy. Burt's son, Harry Jr. (1900–1972), suggested using a wooden stick as a convenient handle. They tried out the idea in the store's hardening room, where they discovered that the stick formed a strong bond when the ice cream crystallized. Burt outfitted twelve street vending trucks in Youngstown with rudimentary freezers and bells to sell his "Good Humor Ice Cream Suckers" in 1920. The first set of bells was from his son's old bobsled. By 1925, Harry Burt Jr. opened a franchise in Miami, Florida.

In January 1922, Burt applied for patents, which were not granted until October 1923 because the patent office thought Good Humors were too similar to Eskimo Pies. The patents were granted only when Burt Jr. traveled to Washington, D.C., with samples to demonstrate the difference. When granted, Good Humor's patents were for the equipment and process to manufacture frozen novelties on a stick, but not for the product itself.

During this period, Frank Epperson started marketing frozen ice on a stick and formed the Popsicle Corporation. Six months after Popsicle received its patent in August 1924, Good Humor sued Popsicle Corporation, and by October 1925 the parties settled out of court. Popsicle agreed to pay Good Humor a licence fee to manufacture what was called frozen suckers from ice and sherbet products. Good Humor reserved the right to manufacture these products from ice cream, frozen custard, and the like.

Harry Burt died in 1926, and two years later his widow sold her interest to the Midland Food Products Company, owned by a group of Cleveland businessmen. Midland Food changed the company's name to the Good Humor Corporation of America and started selling franchises with a $100 down payment. Cora Burt retained the license agreement with Popsicle. Thomas J. Brimer (1900–1978) purchased the Good Humor franchise for the Detroit territory and by 1929 opened his second plant in Chicago. The mob demanded $5,000 protection money and destroyed part of the Chicago fleet when Brimer refused. The resulting publicity helped put Good Humor on the map.

=== 1930–1961: Meehan Family ===
Brimer's father-in-law was a friend of Michael J. Meehan (1891–1948), a controversial New York stock speculator who made a small investment in Brimer's operation. When Brimer paid a 25% dividend in 1929, Meehan financed the acquisition of 75% of Good Humor of America for $500,000. Meehan's wife, Elizabeth Higgins Meehan, was the registered owner of the stock along with Mrs. John J. Raskob, the wife of another New York stock speculator.

The Meehan family's Good Humor Corporation of America operated in New York, Connecticut, New Jersey, Detroit, and Chicago. There were also three major franchises: Good Humor of Baltimore/Washington (operated by the Brimer family), Burt's Good Humor (operated by Harry Burt Jr. in Tulsa, Oklahoma), and Good Humor of California. In addition, distributors served Cleveland, Philadelphia, Albany, Dallas and Miami. In 1931, Good Humor reported a net profit of $452,105, almost as much as Meehan paid for the company.

Good Humor was successful because it provided customers an inexpensive diversion during the Depression. In addition to trucks, the company used push carts, bicycles, shoulder boxes, and even a boat. At most branches, the season was six months, April through September. Jobs were scarce and Good Humor found all the employees it could use, despite an 80-hour work week and near-military discipline. Women were not hired as vendors until 1967. A vendor could be fired for not smartly saluting a customer or saying "Good Humor Ice Cream" instead of the proper "Ice Cream Good Humor" as the company regarded the "Good Humor" itself as a noun with "ice cream" being descriptive. Vendors attended classes for two days at the beginning of the season and the rules were spelled out in a handbook titled "Making Good at Good Humor". While vendors were paid commissions only, it was not unusual for a driver to clear the princely sum of over $100 per week.

To promote the product, customers won a free Good Humor if they found "lucky stick" stamped on the stick of their ice cream. One in twelve was a winner. However, in 1939 the Federal Trade Commission outlawed the promotion as an illegal lottery. The company was more successful in attracting favorable publicity by parking trucks outside of motion picture studios. Over the years, Good Humor appeared in over 200 movies. In 1950, Jack Carson starred in the feature motion picture The Good Humor Man.

In 1937, Michael Meehan became the first broker banned by the Securities and Exchange Commission for stock manipulation and transferred his enterprises to his sons. Two years later, 21-year-old Joseph A. Meehan (1917–1972) became the youngest broker with a seat on the New York Stock Exchange and chairman of Good Humor Corporation, a position he held until 1961.

After World War II, the company moved into the expanding suburbs to serve the baby boomers. Fifty-five percent of Good Humor's customers were age twelve or younger, and trucks then accounted for 90% of the company's sales. By 1956, the company's fleet grew to 2,000 trucks, all purchased since the war. That year, Meehan hired 32-year-old David J. Mahoney (1923–2000) as president of Good Humor. Mahoney was the head of the advertising firm serving Good Humor and later became the president of the large Norton Simon conglomerate. In his five years at Good Humor, his sales increased by 36%.

By 1960 Good Humor expanded and included 85 different treats: sundaes in chocolate, butterscotch, and strawberry; single-serve cups in apricot and honeydew; and more.

=== 1961–present: Unilever and The Magnum Ice Cream Company ===
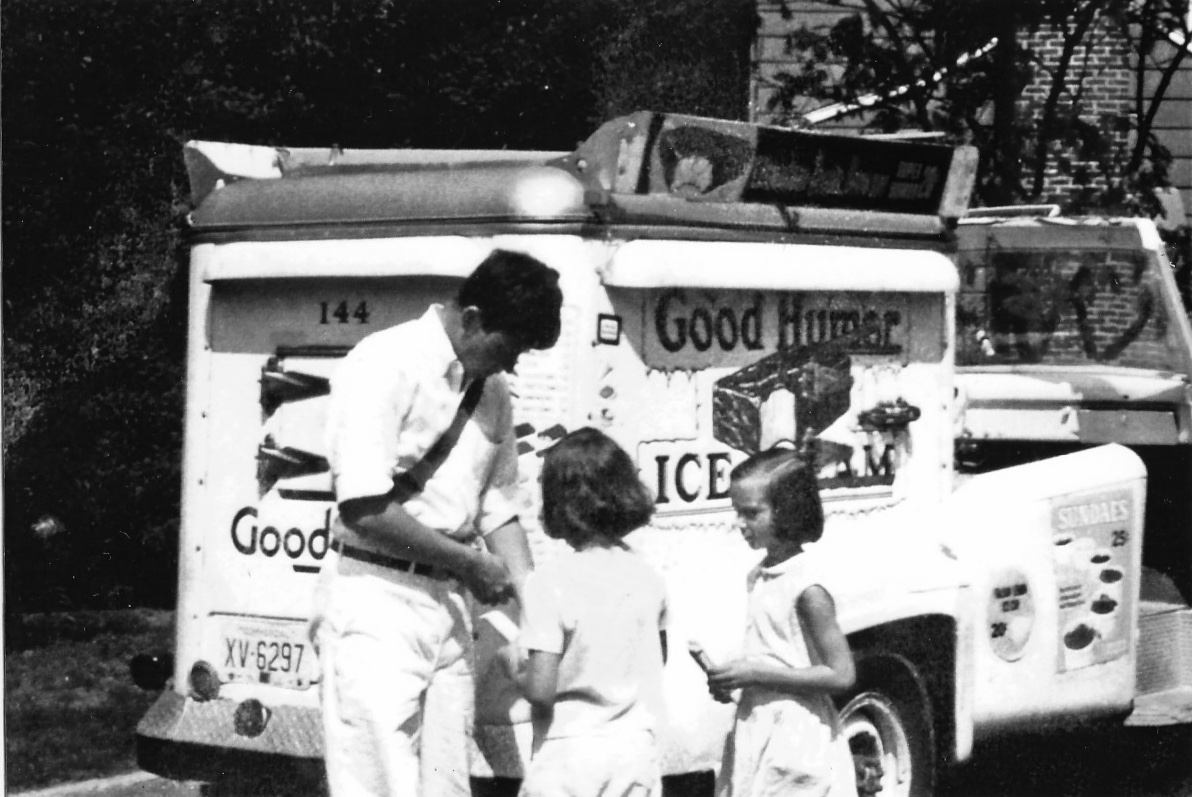
Good Humor vendor with a conventional sales car, Point Pleasant, New Jersey, 1966

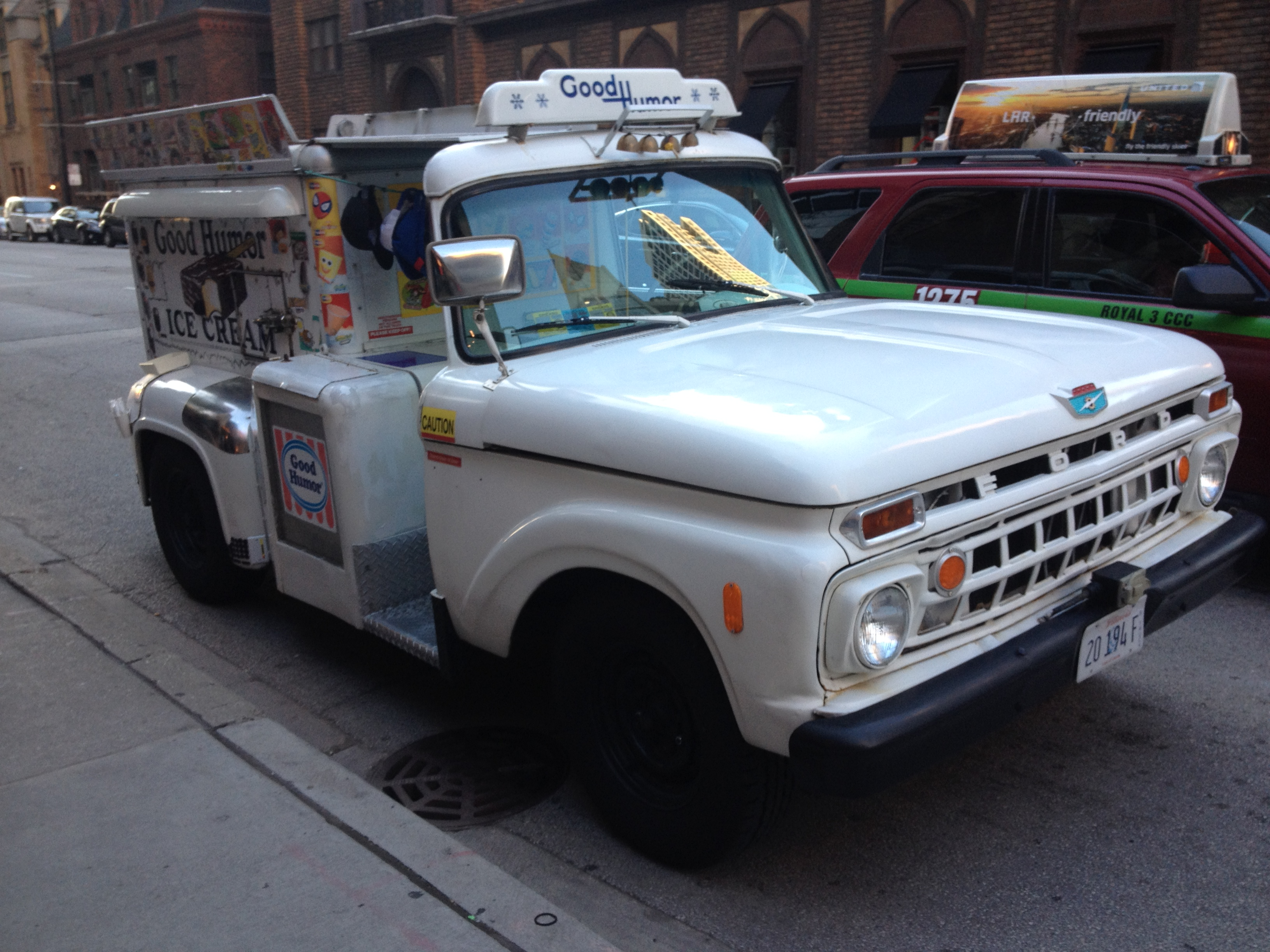
A Good Humor conventional sales car from the 1960s

The Meehan family faced estate planning issues because Mrs. Elizabeth H. Meehan was advancing in years. In 1961, they agreed to sell Good Humor of America to Thomas J. Lipton, a subsidiary of Unilever. Lipton also purchased Good Humor of Baltimore/Washington from the Brimer family. In a separate transaction, the other franchises agreed to stop using the Good Humor name. Of the distributors, only Philadelphia survived as a company branch. Lipton created a grocery division to sell Good Humor products in supermarkets.

Mahoney left the company after the acquisition, and Lipton executives soon characterized Good Humor as a "problem". Much of the fleet purchased after the war was nearing the end of its useful life. As baby boomers matured, sales on many suburban routes declined. While almost from the beginning Good Humor faced competition from companies such as Jack and Jill Ice Cream, Bungalow Bar, etc., it was not until the advent of soft ice cream trucks operated by companies such as Mister Softee that competition impacted sales. Insurance costs increased because courts found ice cream vendors responsible for pedestrian accidents while crossing streets to and from the truck.

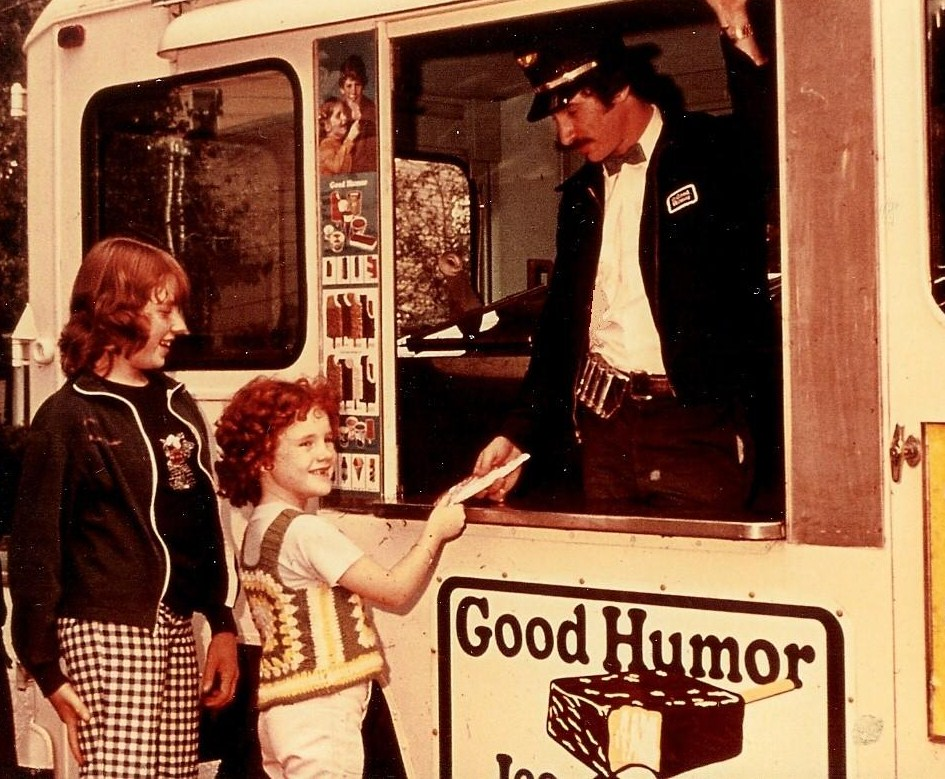
Good Humor vendor with an inside sales car, c. 1975

Good Humor replaced some of its older conventional trucks with large vans designed to compete with Mister Softee. Many of these "inside sales cars" are still operating. The size of the fleet gradually declined, and by the early 1970s the number of trucks was 1,200. Good Humor also worked with the National Highway Traffic Safety Administration to equip vending trucks with school bus "stop" swing arms to reduce pedestrian accidents.

Good Humor was unable to solve its labor problems. The company was unionized early in its history and was struck on several occasions. For example, in 1950 the Teamsters shut down Good Humor's New York operations for three weeks during the critical month of June. Beginning in the 1950s, the labor pool dried up and Good Humor operated over half of its fleet with seasonal employees, mostly college students. On average, new employees lasted two to three weeks because of the long hours. The entire industry, except Good Humor, stopped using commissioned employees and became distributors who leased trucks to the drivers and sold them their products wholesale. Good Humor adopted this system wherever possible but was prevented from converting most branches because of union contracts.

Good Humor became unprofitable beginning in 1968. An increase in gasoline prices during the early 1970s worsened the situation. After absorbing losses for ten years, in 1978 Good Humor closed its street vending operations and became a distributor. The trucks were sold for $1,000 to $3,000 per vehicle, and many of the former Good Humor vendors became independent business owners. As one reported, "I make sure I shut off the engine when I stop now that I'm paying for the gas." Many former competitors also became distributors of Good Humor products.

With the trucks sold, Good Humor focused on the grocery division, and the company returned to profitability by 1984. Unilever, the world's largest marketer of ice cream products, decided to achieve a similar market position in the US through acquisitions. In 1989, Unilever purchased Gold Bond Ice Cream of Green Bay, Wisconsin, which owned Popsicle. In 1992, Unilever acquired Dickie Dee, a Canadian ice cream vending company that sold product from ice cream trucks and tricycle carts. At the time of the sale, there were around 1,500 tricycles in 300 cities. Unilever ended the ice cream bikes in the early 2000s and carts were sold to distributors. The following year, Unilever bought Isaly Klondike, maker of another chocolate-coated ice cream bar invented in Youngstown in the early 1920s. Also in 1993, Unilever acquired Kraft General Foods' ice cream division including the Breyers Ice Cream Company and Sealtest brands, combining these operations into the renamed Good Humor-Breyers.

Unilever integrated its American ice cream division into its main offices in Englewood Cliffs, New Jersey in 2007. Since 2000, Good Humor has been one of numerous Unilever ice cream subsidiaries to use the international Heartbrand for its logo. It removed the Heartbrand in 2009 but brought it back as part of its logo from 2014 onwards.

In June 2020, Good Humor collaborated with music producer RZA to create a new jingle for ice cream trucks to play, to replace "Turkey in the Straw", since that song had been paired in the past with racist lyrics. (Good Humor does not directly operate any trucks, but the company wanted to discourage drivers from playing the song.) The resulting composition was released in August 2020.

== Products ==
The Good Humor logo used until 1998

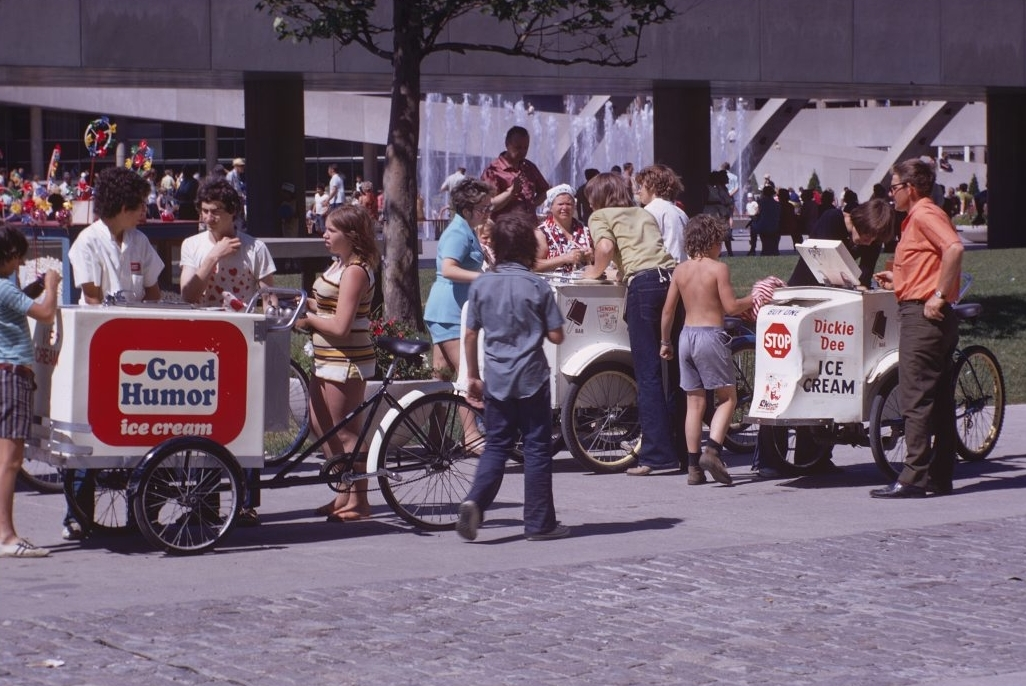
Canadian Good Humor ice cream cart in Toronto, 1984.

In the parlance of the original company, a "Good Humor" was a three-ounce chocolate-coated vanilla ice cream bar on a stick. By 1960, the product line had grown to 85 flavors or combinations. Other "Good Humors" included chocolate-coated chocolate (also called "chocolate malt") and chocolate-coated strawberry plus bars coated in toasted almond, coconut, chocolate cake, strawberry shortcake, and chocolate éclair. Weekly specials came in a wide assortment of flavors, including a red, white, and blue Good Humor for the Fourth of July. Among the specials that did not become popular were Oregon prune and California fig Good Humors. The company even experimented with tomato sherbet.

== Folklore ==
The company's history also includes many stories, such as one about a Good Humor vendor rushing a baby to a hospital for treatment and one about the company's helping to break up a counterfeit money operation on Long Island. During World War II, a Good Humor truck was assigned to follow one of the armies during maneuvers. The commander could not understand how the opposing artillery was quickly locating his position until he realized that the spotters were using the white Good Humor truck as a guide. Rather than deny his troops ice cream, that night he ordered the truck to be painted army green. After the war, a Good Humor vendor took pity on a youngster who was a nickel short and accepted a new magazine in place of the missing five cents. When he returned the next day, the street was lined with stacks of magazines piled by children eager to exchange periodicals for Good Humors.

== See also ==
- Wall's (ice cream)
- Donald F. Duncan Sr.
- List of frozen custard companies
- Mister Softee
- Jack and Jill Ice Cream
- Bungalow Bar
- Popsicle (brand)
