= National Procrastination Week =

Holiday in the first half of March

National Procrastination Week is a national holiday devoted to procrastination and putting-off important tasks. It is an annual event that takes place during the first two weeks of March, but, in spirit of the holiday, the specific dates change annually.

== Purpose ==
There are several expressed goals for the week. The first is to celebrate the act of procrastinating by leaving necessary tasks to be done at a later time. There are, however, other purposes for the holiday. One claim is that the week of putting-off provides a mental and emotional break causing a decrease in stress and anxiety. However the holiday does not advocate sloth and inaction. Instead it places emphasis on accomplishing tasks and leisurely activities that could not be accomplished while one had other responsibilities. These may include reading, cooking, cleaning, and exercising.

== Opposition ==
There is a significant amount of opposition to and disagreement with the holiday. Mostly, those against the holiday state that the week promotes negative and self-destructive behavior. One article expressed "we could even add a week for problem drinkers as well. In fact, I'm sure we could find something for at least one week a month to celebrate all the flavors of our self-regulation failure". Many claim that even in a week, procrastination can develop into a difficult-to-change habit. The opposition claims that through procrastination, one harms all aspects of their lives, at work, at home, and in health.

== Observance ==
Year	dates
2008	March 9–15
2009	second week of March (specific dates unclear)
2010	March 1–7
2011	March 7–13
2012	March 4–10
2013	March 3–9
2014	March 8–14
2015	March 8–15
2016	March 6–12
2017	March 5–11
2018	March 4–10
2019	March 3–9
2020	March 1–7
2021	March 7–13
2022	March 4–10
2023	March 3–9
2024	March 8–14
2025	March 8–15
2026	March 2–6
2027	March 1–5
2028	March 6–10
2029	March 5–9
2030	March 4–8
