= Ice cream van =

Vehicle from which ice cream is sold

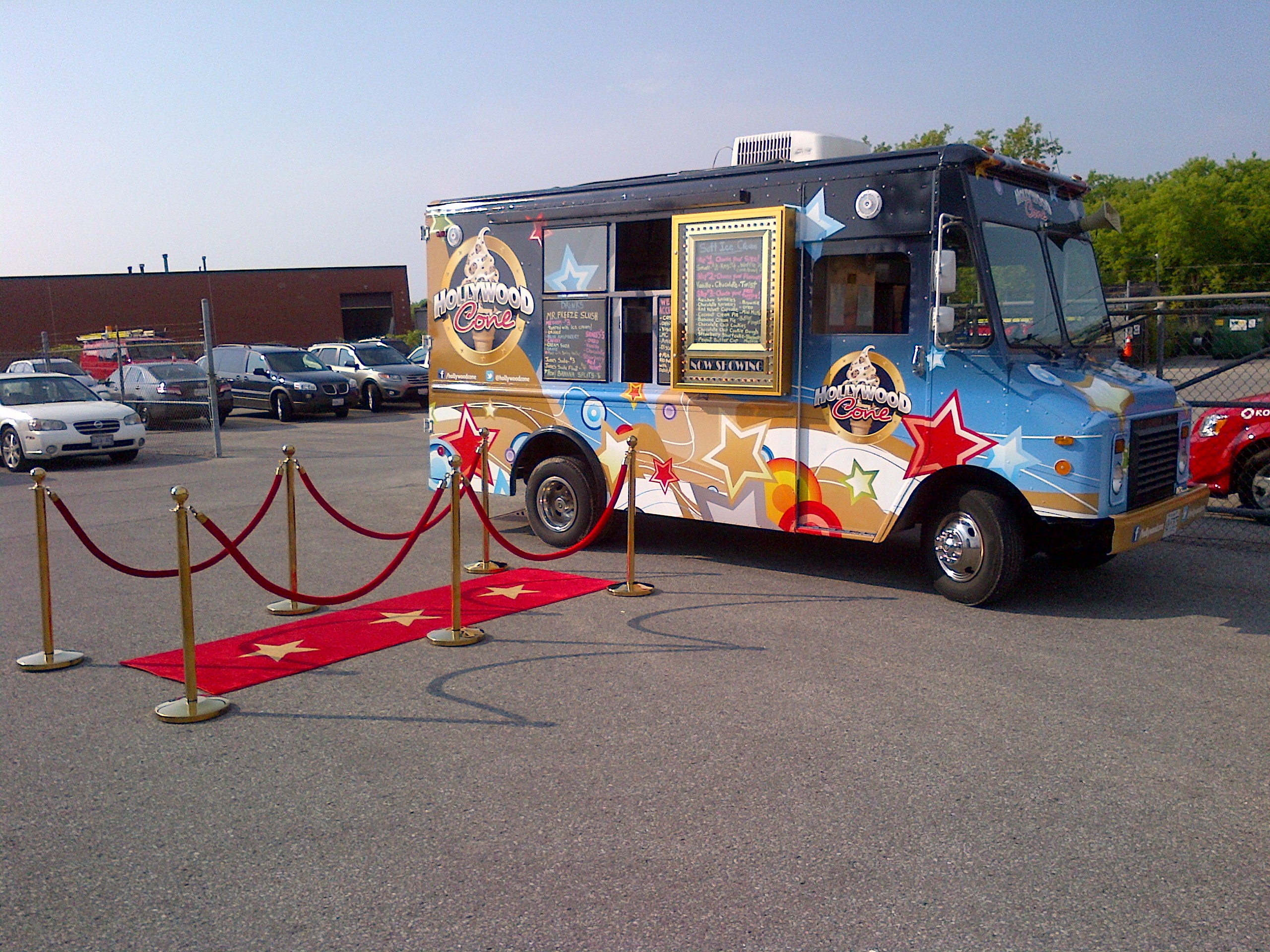
Hollywood Cone Soft ice cream truck in Toronto, Ontario

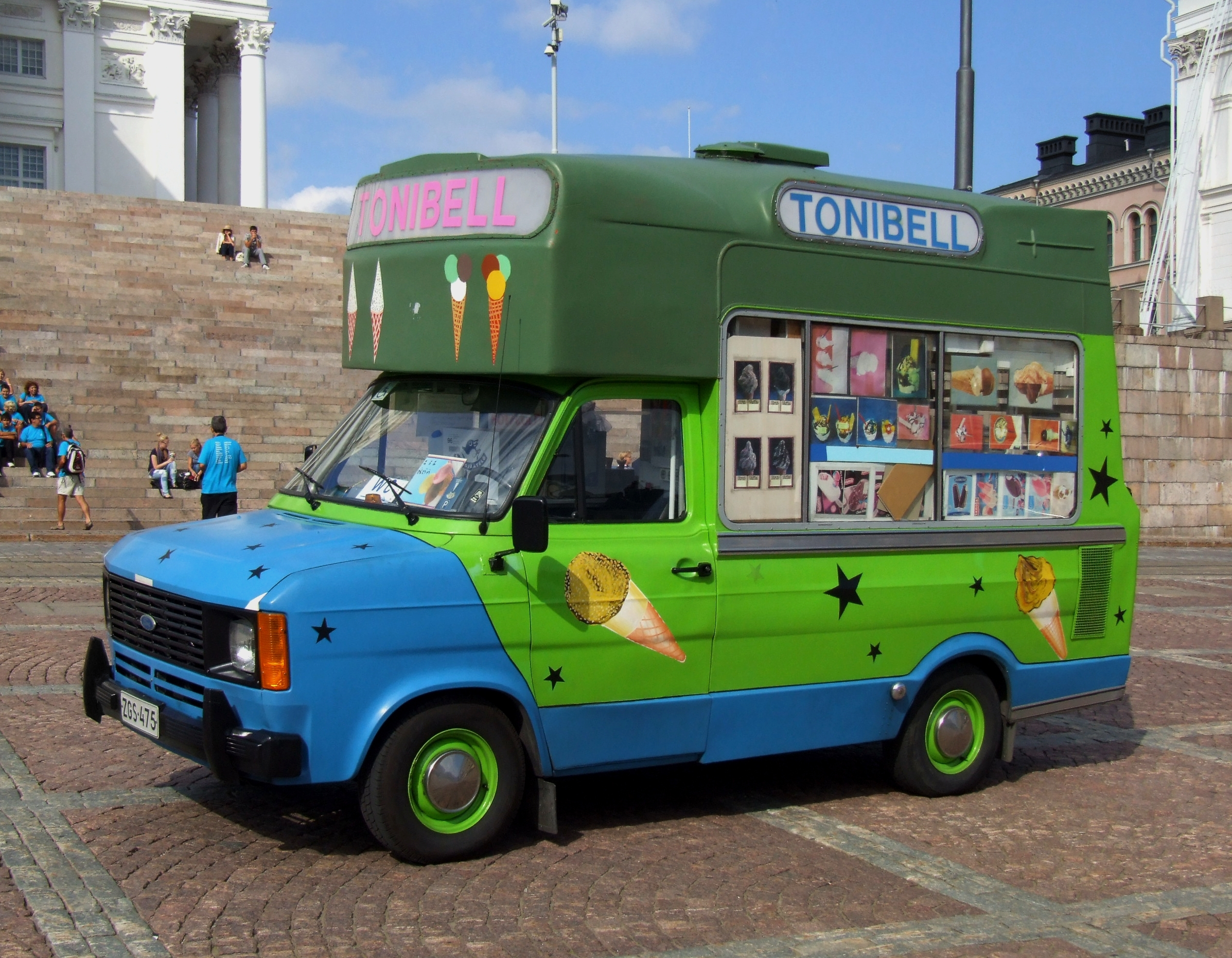
Ice cream van at the Senate Square in Helsinki, Finland

An ice cream van (Commonwealth English) or ice cream truck (North American English) is a commercial vehicle from which ice cream is sold, usually during the spring and summer. Ice cream vans are often used for street vending and drive through residential areas and can be parked at beaches, parks, or other areas where people congregate. Ice cream vans often have decorations, a serving window on the kerbside, and a display of available products and their prices. Most ice cream vans are independently owned and operated. However, there are ice cream van franchises such as Mister Softee and Mister Whippy.

A distinctive feature of ice cream vans (in comparison to other kinds of food trucks) is their sound devices, used to attract attention. Some use a bell or a set of bells that is rung while many use a horn loudspeaker which amplified music is played from. Some ice cream vans use both of these sound devices. The amplified music played by ice cream vans is typically a short instrumental version of a nursery rhyme or a classical, folk, or traditional pop song that is played repeatedly and sounds like a music box or synthesized chimes. Early ice cream vans utilize electro-mechanical music boxes, with electronic systems becoming more common in the late 20th century.

== History ==
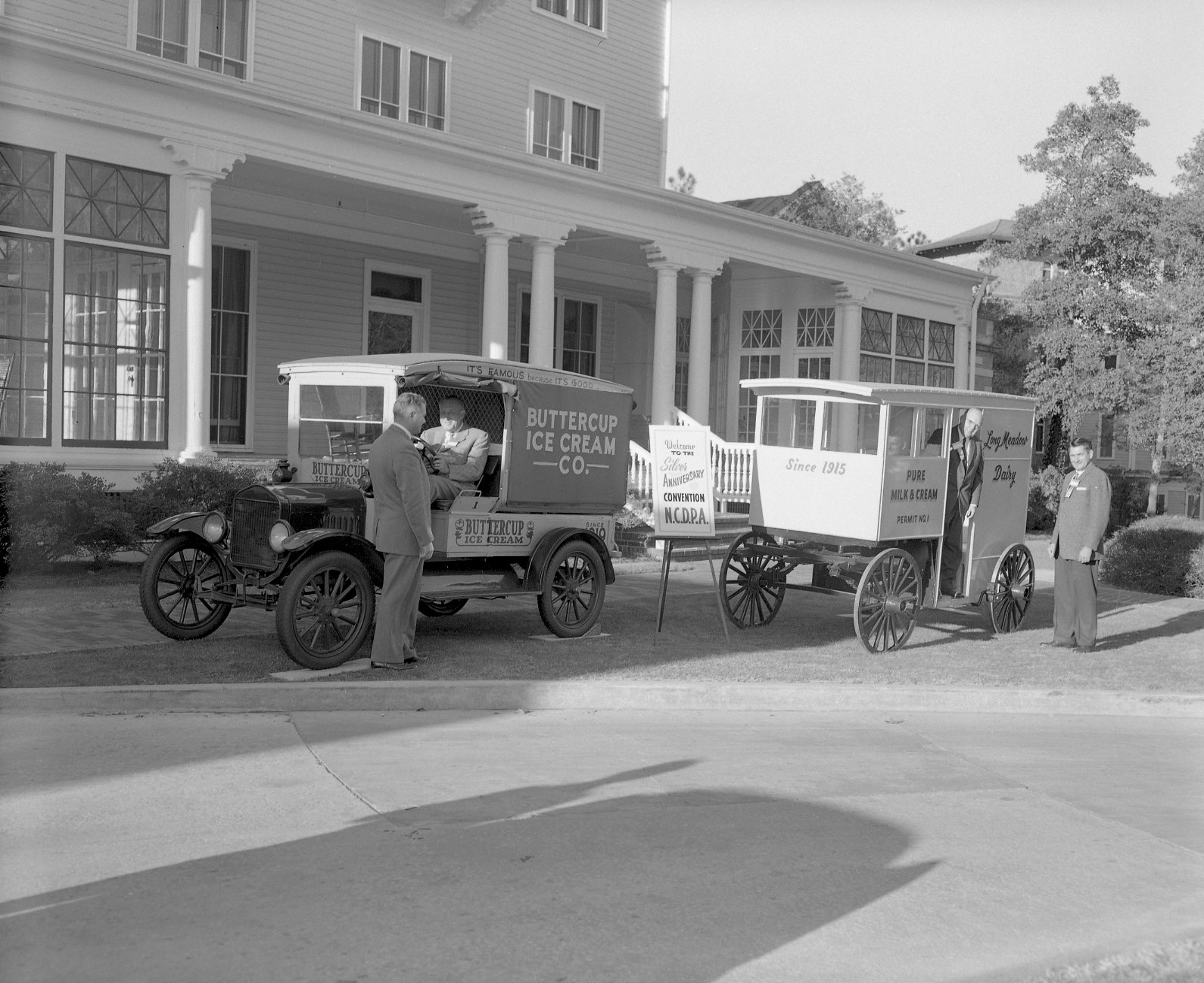
Vintage ice cream truck in Pinehurst, North Carolina, United States

Early ice cream vans carried simple ice cream, during a time when most families did not own a freezer. As freezers became more commonplace, ice cream vans moved towards selling novelty ice cream items, such as bars and ice pops.

In the United States, ice cream trucks became more common after World War II. Ice cream parlors used ice cream trucks to reach customers after the development of urban sprawl.

== In the United Kingdom ==
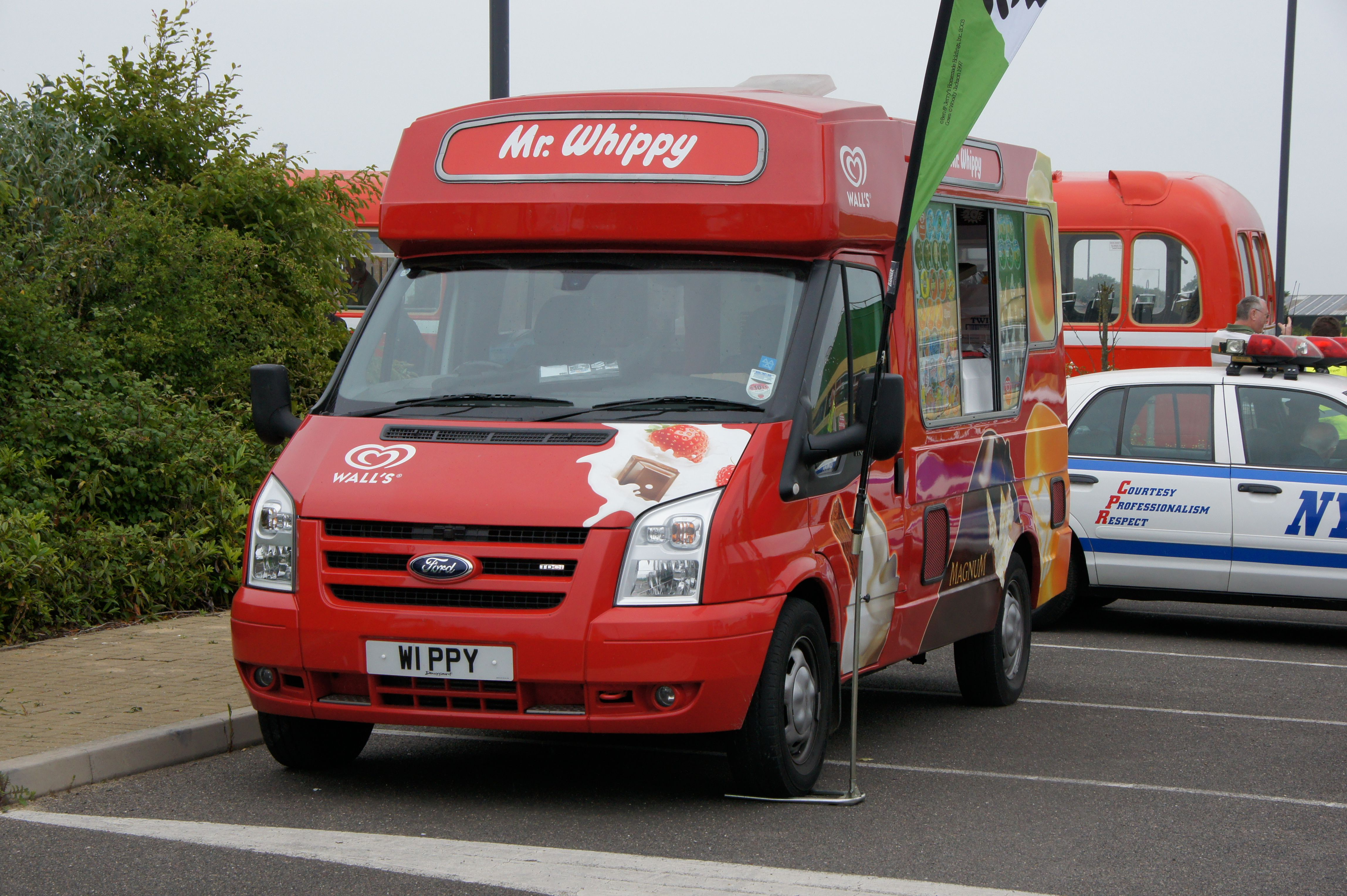
A Ford Transit-based Mr. Whippy van in Clacton

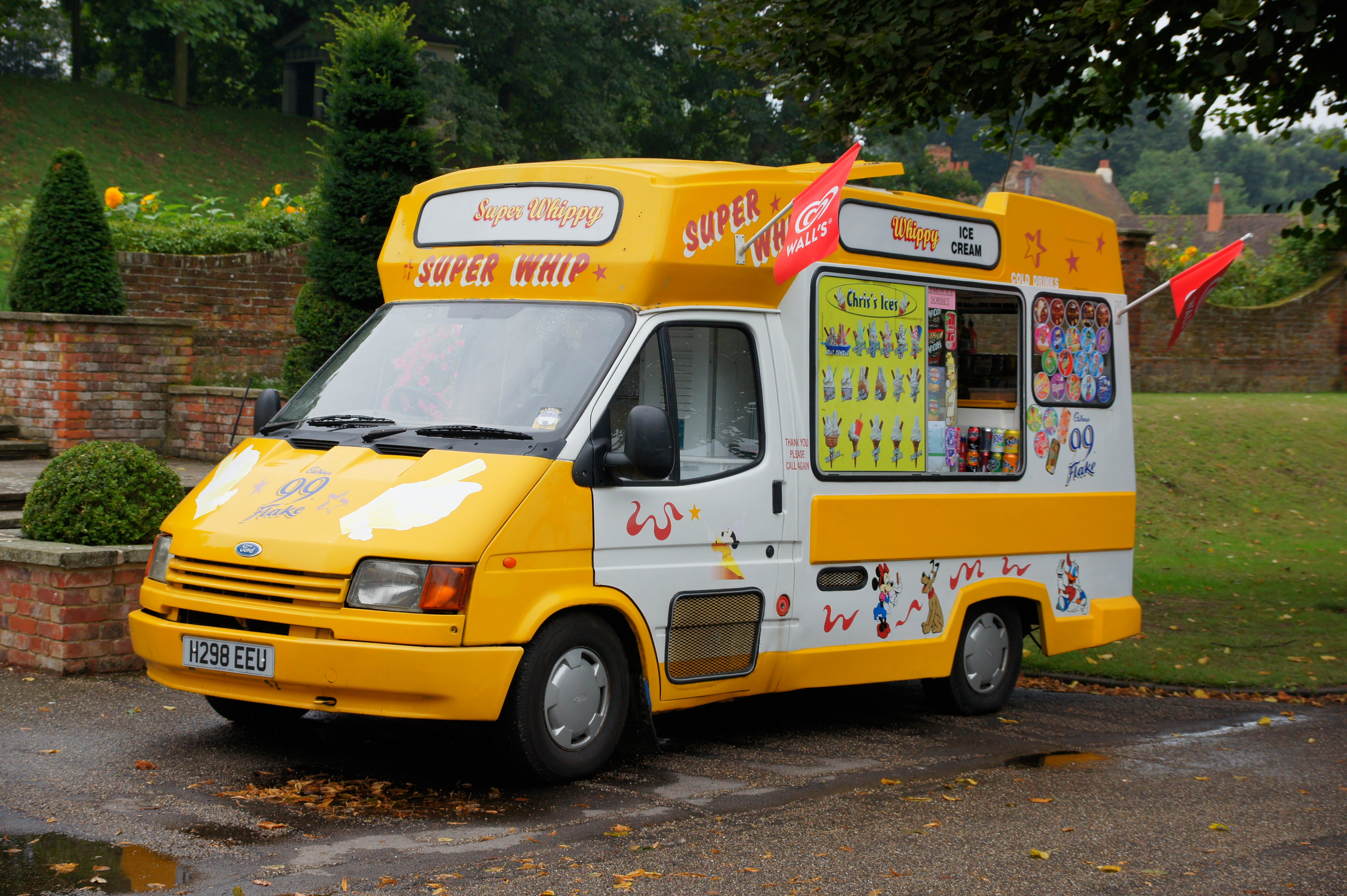
An older Ford Transit-based Super Whip ice cream van in Colchester

There are mainly two types of ice cream vans in the United Kingdom:

- a hard van, which sells scoop ice cream and is only equipped with a freezer.
- a soft van, which has a freezer and also a soft serve "whippy" machine for serving ice cream cones and screwballs.

They are usually converted from factory standard vans with the rear cut away and replaced with a fibre glass body.

The traditional song played by ice cream vans in the United Kingdom, Ireland, Australia, and New Zealand is "Greensleeves". Other songs in these countries include "Anchors Aweigh", the "Colonel Bogey March", "Girls and Boys Come Out to Play", "Itsy Bitsy Teenie Weenie Yellow Polkadot Bikini", "The Liberty Bell", "'O sole mio", "Oh! Oh! Antonio!", "Spring Song", "The Sun Has Got His Hat On", "Swedish Rhapsody No. 1", and "Waltzing Matilda".

In several local authority areas, particularly in London Boroughs with existing street markets, street trading regulations prohibit ice cream vans from remaining in one static location. The legislation also contains powers to ban ice cream vans from specific streets. Proposals in the current London Local Authorities Bill would allow only 15 minutes of trading per vehicle per street each day.

Ice cream van chimes are regulated under a national code of practice that limits the sound level to 80 decibels and the duration of chimes to twelve seconds. Chimes should not be played more often than once every three minutes near sensitive locations such as schools, hospitals, and places of worship when they are in use. However, these rules are rarely observed or enforced.

In Scotland, ice cream vans have been used to sell smuggled cigarettes and, in the 1980s Glasgow ice cream wars, as front organizations to sell illicit drugs.

=== Ice cream van manufacturer ===
Whitby Morrison, based in Crewe, Cheshire, was founded by Bryan Whitby, who filed a UK patent in 1965 for mobile ice cream-producing equipment through which soft serve units were powered off the van's drive mechanism. Today, the company is the UK's biggest ice cream van manufacturer, producing around 100 vans a year; its products have been exported to over 60 countries. The company has also been developing a fully electric on-board battery system to power the soft-scoop machines it fits; the first all-electric van was expected to be delivered in the summer of 2019.

== In the United States and Canada ==
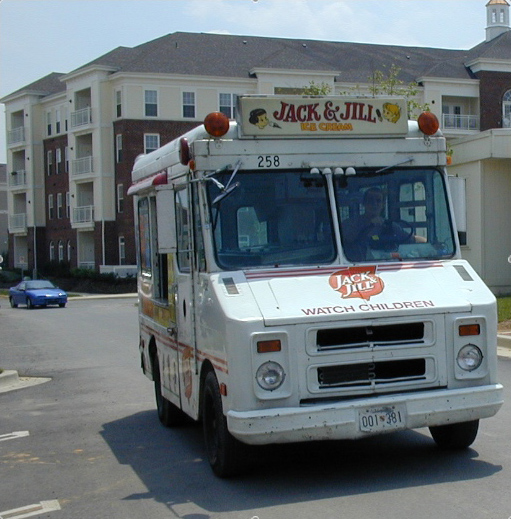
A step van-based ice cream truck, the most common type in the US

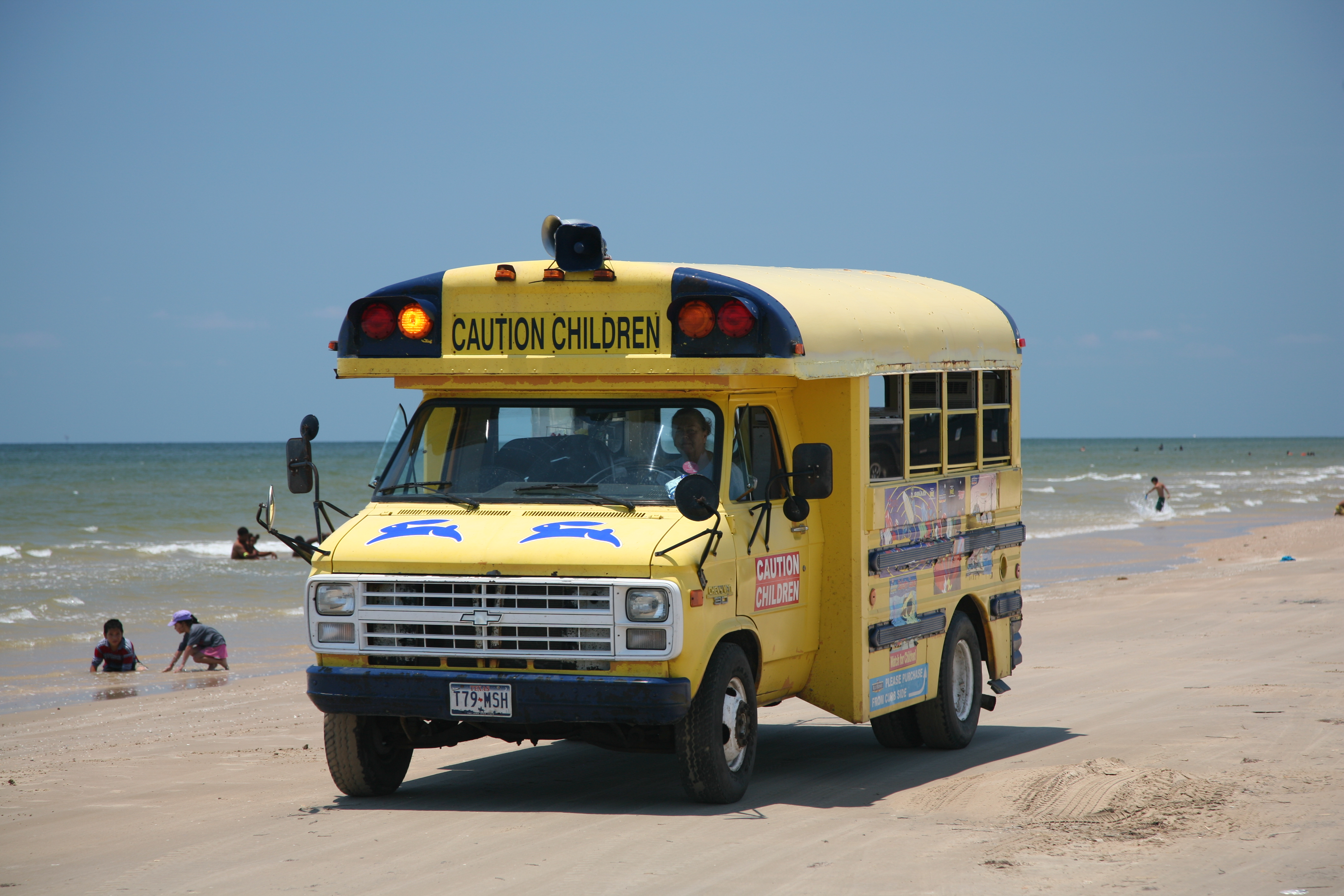
A school bus-based ice cream truck

In the United States and Canada, ice cream trucks are commonly converted from step vans, which also give rise to the iconic and traditional design of North American ice cream trucks. There are also other conversions with cargo vans, conversion vans, mail trucks, passenger vans and small school buses. Ice cream trucks that only sell pre-packaged novelty products such as ice cream bars, ice cream sandwiches, and popsicles are more common than those that sell soft serve ice cream.

Apart from ice cream, ice cream trucks may also sell snow cones, Italian ice or water ice, snacks, toys, and candy. Many trucks have a yellow or red triangular sign with lights, similar to a school bus stop sign that is extended to warn other drivers to slow down because children could be crossing the street to buy ice cream.

Traditional songs played by ice cream trucks in the US and Canada are "The Band Played On", "Camptown Races", "The Entertainer", "I'm Popeye the Sailor Man", "It's a Small World", "La Cucaracha", "Little Brown Jug", the Mister Softee Jingle ("Jingles and Chimes"), "Music Box Dancer", "Picnic" (a Japanese children’s song), "Pop Goes the Weasel", "Red Wing", "Sailing, Sailing", "Turkey in the Straw", "Wiegenlied", and "Yankee Doodle". Ice cream trucks in the US have been playing music since at least 1927, when Good Humor trucks in Los Angeles played "Stodola Pumpa."

== In Scandinavia ==
=== Norway ===
Norway has two leading ice-cream van companies; Isbilen (lit. ice-car) by Fråst, and Diplom-isbilen by Diplom-Is. Diplom-Isbilen sells ice cream made by Diplom-Is, and isbilen sells ice cream made by Isbjørn-Is; they also sell fish. The ice cream vans can be heard from afar and attract customers to the street by playing the iconic tune "Norge rundt", symbolizing their presence all over the country.

=== Sweden ===
Hemglass is the Swedish brand of the ice cream manufacturer Hjem-IS Europa A/S and was launched in Sweden in 1968. The company distributes its products in ice cream vans in Sweden Hemglass and Denmark (Hjem-IS).

== See also ==
- Ice cream cart
- Food truck
- Refrigerator truck
- Street food
