= List of ice cream flavors =

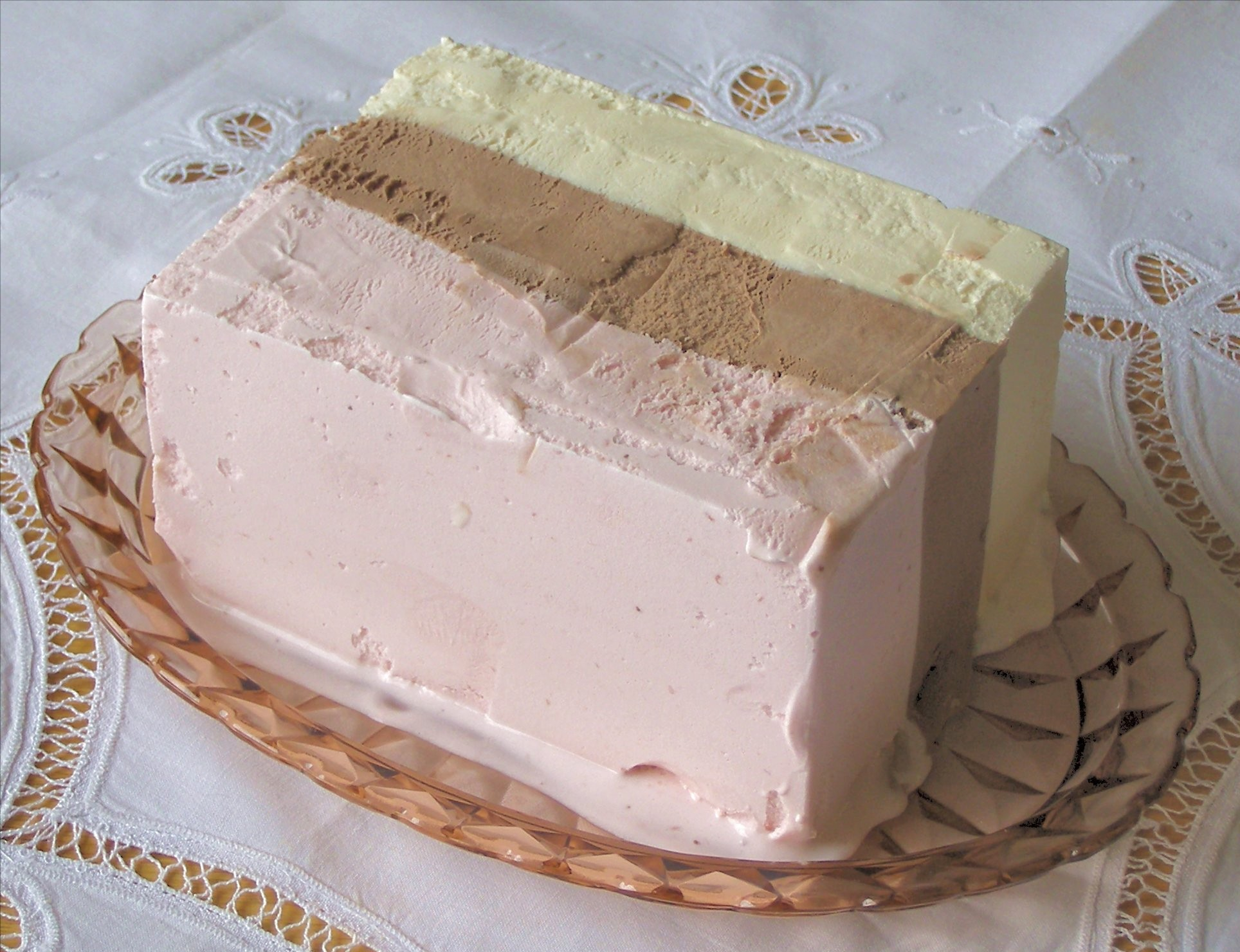
Neapolitan ice cream is made of flavors of ice cream, chocolate, vanilla and strawberry side by side in the same container.

This is a list of notable ice cream flavors. Ice cream is a frozen dessert usually made from dairy products, such as milk and cream, and often combined with fruits or other ingredients and flavors. Most varieties contain sugar, although some are made with other sweeteners.

== Flavors ==
Name	Image	Region	Type	Distinctive ingredients and description
Bacon			Savory	A modern invention, generally created by adding bacon to egg custard and freezing the mixture
Beer				Flavors vary with the type of beer used: a stout beer, for instance can can impart a malty and caramel-like flavor, while the use of pilsner, India pale ale and pale ale can impart flavors of bitterness.
Biscuit Tortoni		France		Made with eggs and heavy cream, often containing chopped cherries or topped with minced almonds or crumbled macaroons
Black raspberry		New England	Fruit	Black raspberry ice cream often contains chocolate chips, and is especially popular in New England.
Blue moon		United States, Upper Midwest		Has a bright blue coloring, and is available in the Upper Midwest of the United States
Brown bread				Originated in France in the 18th century. Brown bread appears in pieces that are toasted, caramelized, or infused into a liquid, before being strained and removed.
Butter Brickle		United States, Sioux Falls		The registered trademark of a toffee ice cream flavoring introduced by the Blackstone Hotel in Omaha, Nebraska, in the 1920s. Alternately, it is often prepared and sold as butter vanilla-flavored ice cream with tiny flecks of butter toffee instead of chunks of Heath bar.
Butter pecan		Southern United States		Smooth vanilla ice cream with a slight buttery flavor, with pecans added.
Caramel				
Cherry			Fruit	Includes variations (e.g. Amaretto cherry, black cherry)
Chocolate				
Chocolate chip cookie dough				
Coffee				
Cookies and cream				
Cornish		United Kingdom, Cornwall		
Crab		Japan, Hokkaido	Savory	A Japanese creation, it is described as having a sweet taste; the island of Hokkaido, Japan, is known for manufacturing it.
Garlic			Savory	Savory in taste, in at least one notable preparation the flavor combines vanilla ice cream and garlic.
Grape			Fruit	
Green tea		Japan		
Goody Goody Gum Drops		New Zealand		Unique to New Zealand
Hokey pokey		New Zealand		Eaten in New Zealand, consisting of plain vanilla ice cream with small, solid lumps of honeycomb toffee
Lemon				
Mint chocolate chip				Mint ice cream with small chocolate chips. In some cases the liqueur crème de menthe is used to provide the mint flavor, but in most cases peppermint or spearmint flavoring is used.
Moon mist		Atlantic Canada	Fruit	A blend of grape, banana, and blue raspberry (or sometimes bubblegum) flavors, popular in Atlantic Canada. The flavors are generally blended together to give a mist-like texture.
Moose tracks		United States, Michigan		Ice cream with peanut butter cups and Moose Tracks fudge
Neapolitan				Usually vanilla, chocolate and strawberry ice cream together side by side
Oyster			Savory	
Pistachio				
Queso		Philippines	Savory	
Raspberry ripple			Fruit	Raspberry syrup injected into vanilla ice cream.
Rocky road				Chocolate ice cream, nuts, and whole or diced marshmallows, or sometimes replaced with marshmallow creme, a more fluid version. Variations exist.
Rum raisin			Fruit	
Sili		Philippines		
Spumoni		Italy		A molded Italian ice cream made with layers of different colors and flavors, usually containing candied fruits and nuts
Stracciatella		Italy, Bergamo		
Strawberry		United States, Maryland	Fruit	
Superman		Midwestern United States		
Teaberry			Fruit	
Tiger tail		Canada		A flavor popular in Canada, consisting of orange-flavored ice cream with swirls of black licorice
Tramontana		Argentina, Mar del Plata		Dark chocolate, white chocolate, dulce de leche and cookies.
Tutti frutti			Fruit	
Ube		Philippines		Purple yam – a popular ice cream flavor in the Philippines
Vanilla				

== See also ==
- List of dairy products
- List of desserts
- List of ice cream brands
- List of ice cream parlor chains
- List of soft drink flavors
