= Chocolate mint =

Chocolate mint may refer to:

- Mint chocolate (flavoured chocolate)
  - Mint chocolate chip
- Chocolate Mint (plant)
