= Moose Tracks =

Ice cream flavor with peanut butter cups

Moose Tracks is a branded flavor of ice cream owned and licensed by Denali Flavors Inc. that is manufactured by different companies under various brands. The Original Moose Tracks product description is: "vanilla ice cream with peanut butter cups and famous Moose Tracks fudge".

There are many iterations of Moose Tracks, including chocolate, mint, and brownie. Light varieties of the ice cream are produced, which have fewer calories compared to full-calorie versions. Additionally, a frozen yogurt variety is produced. The brand's mascot is Tracks the Moose.

The first scoop of Moose Tracks was tasted in July 1988. The name "Moose Tracks" came from a mini golf course in Marquette, Michigan, located in the Upper Peninsula of Michigan, which was right down the street from Jilbert Dairy, the first ice cream shop to carry Original Moose Tracks.

== Brands ==
Many different brands license the Moose Tracks flavor including Strohs, Belmont (ALDI), Market Pantry (Target), Private Selection (Kroger Co.), Dean's, Signature Select (Safeway/Albertsons), Mayfield, Kawartha Dairy Company, Publix.

== Variations ==
In addition to the Original Moose Tracks flavor, there are over a dozen other varieties of Moose Tracks:

- Chocolate Moose Tracks
- Caramel Brownie Moose Tracks
- Mint Moose Tracks
- Extreme! Maximum Fudge Moose Tracks
- Brownie Moose Tracks
- Peppermint Bark Moose Tracks
- Black Raspberry Moose Tracks
- Cherry Moose Tracks
- Maximum Fudge Moose Tracks
- Extreme! Moose Tracks
- Original Moose Tracks No Sugar Added
- Glacier Mint Moose Tracks
- Chocolate Peanut Butter Moose Tracks

Denali Flavors also licenses several other flavors:

- Caramel Caribou
- Salty Caramel Caribou
- Bear Claw
- Bear Foot Brownie
- Otter Paws
- Black Raspberry Bugaboo

== Snack mix ==
Denali Flavors and Georgia Nut Company in Skokie, Illinois collaborated to create a trail mix brand based upon the Moose Tracks flavor. Moose Tracks Snack mix is available at Walgreens in the Nice! brand.

== See also ==
- List of ice cream flavors
