= Tramontana =

Tramontana, Tramontane, or Tramuntana may refer to:

== Tramontana ==
- "Tramontana", a short story by Gabriel García Márquez, in Strange Pilgrims
- Tramontana (ice cream), an Argentine ice cream flavor
- Tramontana (sports car), a Spanish sports car firm
- Sebi Tramontana (born 1960), jazz trombonist most often associated with avant-garde jazz and free improvisation music
- Spanish submarine Tramontana (S74), a submarine of the Spanish Navy

== Tramontane ==
- Tramontane, a northern wind (tramontana in Italian and tramuntana in Catalan)
- "Tramontane", an instrumental by the rock group Foreigner, from their album Double Vision (Foreigner album); served as the "B" side to their single "Hot Blooded"
- Tramontane (film), a 2016 Lebanese drama film
- The Pole star, a visible star
- Tramontane, a science fiction novel by Emil Petaja

== Tramuntana ==
- Serra de Tramuntana, a small mountain chain in Majorca
- 35725 Tramuntana, the name of an asteroid
