= Bacon ice cream =

Bacon dish

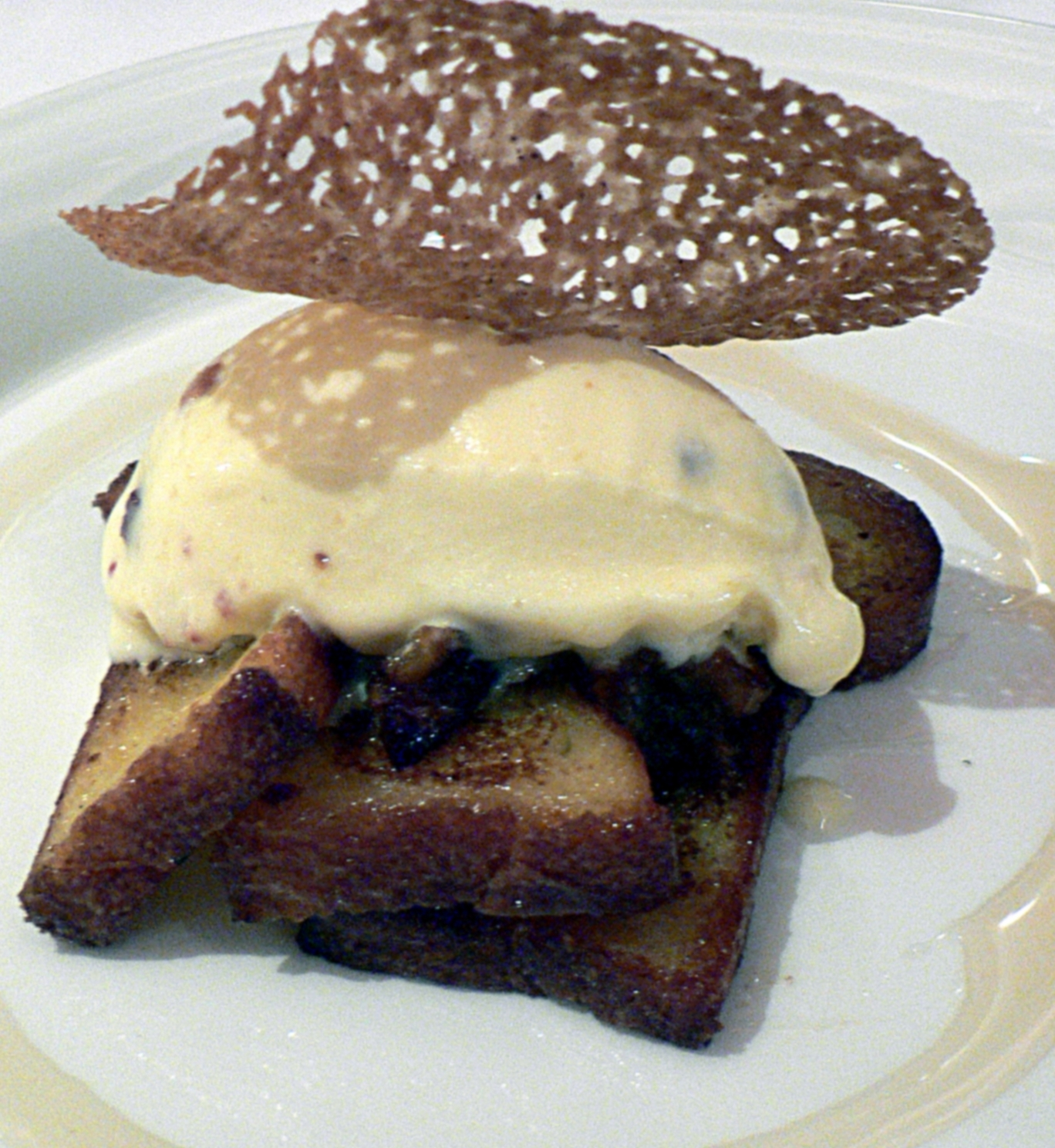
- French toast with bacon ice cream, maple syrup and cinnamon tuile
- Alternative names: Bacon and egg ice cream
- Course: Dessert
- Serving temperature: Cold

Bacon ice cream (or bacon-and-egg ice cream) is an ice cream generally created by adding bacon to egg custard and freezing the mixture. The concept originated in a 1973 sketch on the British comedy series The Two Ronnies as a joke; it was eventually created for April Fools' Day by a New York ice cream parlor in 1992. In the 2000s, the English chef Heston Blumenthal experimented with ice cream, making a custard similar to scrambled eggs and adding bacon to create one of his signature dishes. It now appears on dessert menus in other restaurants.

== Origins ==
Ice cream is generally expected to be a sweet food, eaten as a dessert, even though there is evidence of savory ice creams eaten in Victorian times. Bacon ice cream originated as a joke, a flavor that no one would willingly eat, in the 1973 "Ice Cream Parlor Sketch" by The Two Ronnies, where a customer requests cheese and onion flavored ice cream followed by smokey bacon.

In 1992, bacon-and-egg ice cream was created as an April Fools' Day experiment at Aldrich's Beef and Ice Cream Parlor in Fredonia, New York. Ten years earlier, co-owner Scott Aldrich was challenged by a gravy salesman to make beef gravy ice cream, which he did for April Fools' Day of 1982. Although it was reportedly "their most disgusting" creation, Aldrich's went on to release other unusual flavors on April Fools' Day, such as "chocolate spaghetti ice cream" (the first of Julia Aldrich's many contributions), "ketchup and mustard swirl", "pork and beans" or "sauerkraut and vanilla" in 1991. In 1992, they made 15 US gallons (57 L; 12 imp gal) of bacon-and-egg ice cream which he gave away free to anyone who would try it. The ice creams generally received positive reviews. In 1992, The Victoria Advocate reported,

Despite the disgusting names, most of [Aldrich's] prank flavors taste good, he said. Bacon and egg tastes like a slightly nutty vanilla, though the faint flavor of flaky egg yolk sometimes pushes through.

In 2003 an ice cream parlor, "Udder Delight", opened in Rehoboth Beach, Delaware, specializing in "outlandish" ice cream flavors. Among other flavors, such as their peanut butter and jelly ice cream, they have created a bacon ice cream that tastes like butter pecan. The owner, Chip Hearn, had included the flavor along with 17 others in an invitation-only focus group, where the tasters were allowed to suggest changes and give opinions on the flavor.

== Heston Blumenthal ==
The English chef Heston Blumenthal creates unusual dishes using molecular gastronomy. His restaurant, the Fat Duck in Bray, Berkshire, has won three Michelin stars among other achievements. As early as 2001, Blumenthal created savory ice cream flavors such as mustard grain and crab. In an article explaining the concept of "flavor encapsulation", Blumenthal explained that flavor is much more intense in encapsulated bursts, rather than when dispersed in a solution; therefore, the more that eggs are cooked, the more that the proteins stick together. This creates pockets of egg flavor in the ice cream, which release as it melts in the mouth.

[Blumenthal's] bacon and egg ice cream came about through his interest in "flavour encapsulation": the principle of which means a single coffee bean crushed in your teeth while drinking hot water will taste much more of coffee than the same crushed bean dissolved in the water. One day, using that principle, he over-cooked the egg custard for an ice cream, so that it practically became scrambled. He puréed that and made an ice cream from it, that had an immense eggy flavour... [which] was not particularly pleasant. Which was when he decided to see if he could incorporate the sweet tones of smoked bacon into an egg ice cream. Boy, did it work.

— Jay Rayner, The Observer

Traditional ice cream is frozen egg custard with flavors added. Blumenthal whisks egg yolks with sugar until the sugar interacts with the proteins in the yolk, creating a network of proteins. The entire substance turns white, at which point flavoring can be added and cooked in. While stirring the mixture, Blumenthal cools it as fast as possible using liquid nitrogen.

Blumenthal's bacon-and-egg ice cream, now one of his signature dishes, along with his other unique flavors, has given him a reputation as the "Wizard of Odd" and has made his restaurant a magnet for food enthusiasts. Blumenthal has stated that one ambition is to create an ice cream with flavors released in time-separated stages; for example, bacon and egg followed by orange juice or tea. Once he perfects the technique of separating the flavors, he would attempt mussels followed by chocolate.

== Recipes ==
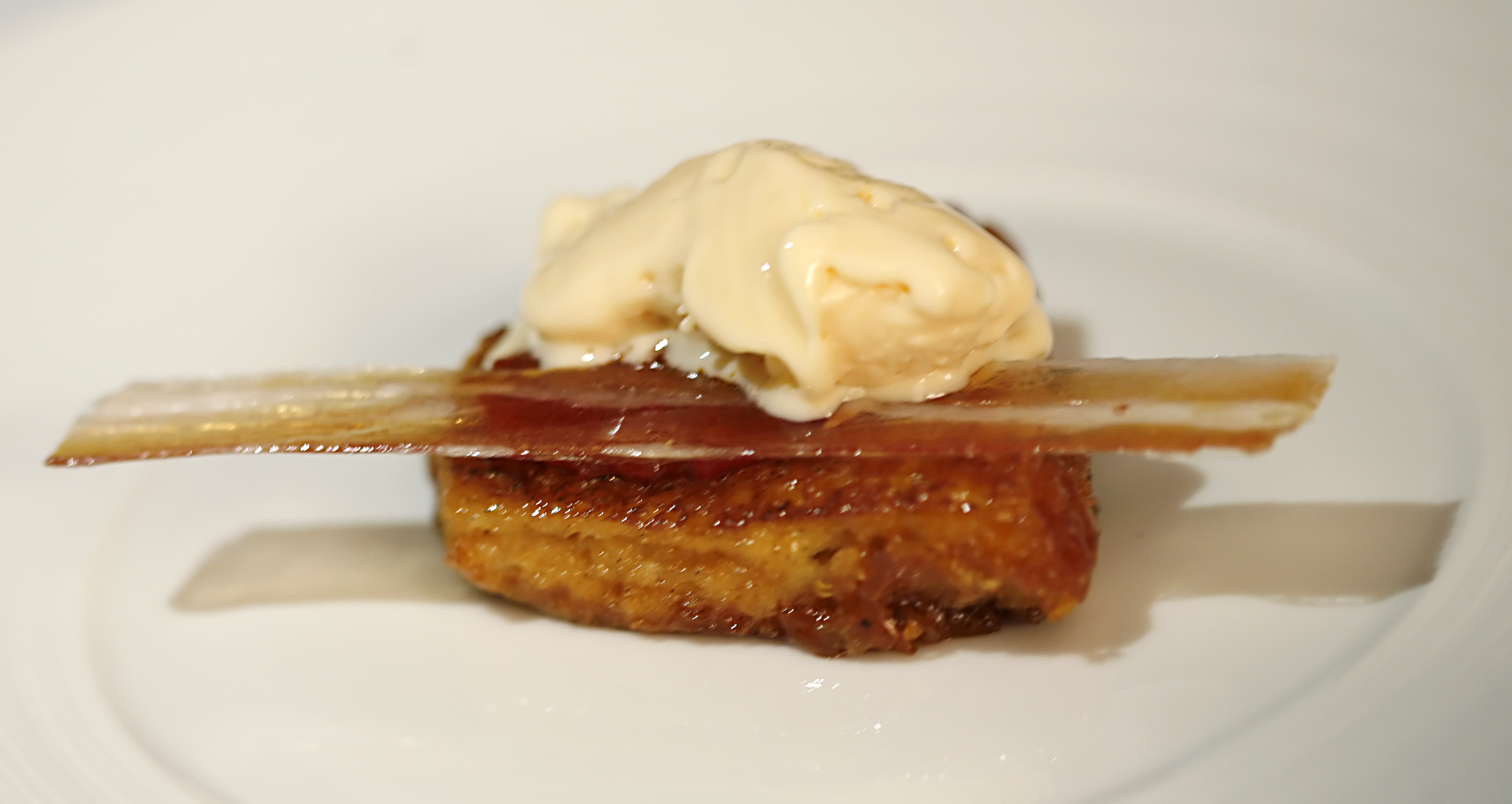
Bacon ice cream incorporated in a dish

As bacon ice cream was created in 1992 and came to prominence in the 2000s, there is no traditional recipe. Recipes generally involve adding bacon to a standard sweet ice cream recipe, often vanilla but other suggestions include coffee, rum or pecan. The saltiness of the bacon highlights the sweetness of the ice cream. According to one Wired.com article, the bacon should be candied before addition, a process which involves baking the bacon in a sugar syrup. This has the benefit of sweetening the bacon, similarly to pancakes in some parts of the United States.

=== Heston Blumenthal variation ===
Blumenthal's recipe uses ice cream without flavoring, but which tastes of an egg. In the recipe featured in The Big Fat Duck Cookbook, the bacon is lightly roasted with the fat on, then infused in milk for 10 hours. The infused mix is precisely heated with egg and sugar to overcook the eggs, increasing the "eggy" flavor, then sieved, put through a food processor, churned, and frozen. The ice cream is served with caramelized French toast, a tomato compote, a slice of pancetta hardened with maple syrup, and tea jelly.

Blumenthal has since updated his recipe to include ten hours of soaking the bacon in a vacuum-packed bag before baking. He has also changed the presentation so that the unfrozen ice cream is injected into empty egg shells, then dramatically scrambled at the customer's table in liquid nitrogen, giving the impression of cooking.

== Reception ==
Bacon ice cream has received a mixed reception; as a combination of sweet and savory flavors, it was designed to be controversial. In 2004, rival chef Nico Ladenis thought the Michelin system was doing a "great disservice to the industry" by hailing Blumenthal as a genius for egg-and-bacon ice cream, saying that originality alone should not merit a Michelin star. Blumenthal pointed out that Ladenis had never tried the aforementioned ice cream.

Trevor White has suggested that Blumenthal had latched onto a culture where diners cannot get enough of the new and are spoiled by choice, comparing the food to a "freak show". Janet Street-Porter has criticized Blumenthal's cooking as pretentious. She attempted to make his bacon-and-egg ice cream from the recipe published in his The Big Fat Duck Cookbook, altering the recipe slightly due to her hectic workload and guessing when she did not have the right tools. The result she described as nauseating and "too sickly for words".

The ice cream sparked debate in the Los Angeles Times when food writer Noelle Carter described bacon ice cream as perfection but the health section put up a photograph of a heart bypass and the headline "Bacon ice cream. No good can come of it". The Delaware "Udder Delight" ice cream maker, Chip Hearn, who made bacon ice cream appears to have done so partly as a gimmick to get people into his shop since he allows customers to taste any flavor in the store. He felt that his flavors differentiated him from the many other parlors on the shore and many people come in to try bacon ice cream only to buy something else.

== Notable uses ==
Bacon ice cream has been recreated by other chefs in recent years. For example, it appears on the menu at Espai Sucre in Barcelona, a restaurant that specializes in desserts, with descriptions such as "innovative" and "spectacular". In the United States, bacon was one of the themes for dessert at the Fancy food show. In 2006, two separate contestants created versions of bacon ice cream in the reality series Top Chef. Celebrity chef Bob Blumer won a Texas ice cream making competition with a bacon ice cream. Originally planning to use candied bacon, he changed at the last moment to do a bacon brittle ice cream. Chef Michael Symon made bacon ice cream in the first season of the Food Network's The Next Iron Chef competition. Andrew Knowlton, a judge, dismissed it as not original. But Symon managed to progress in the competition and eventually win. Burger King rolled out a "bacon sundae", vanilla ice cream with caramel, chocolate, bacon bits, and one strip of bacon, in the summer of 2012 in the US. It was tested in Nashville in April.

== See also ==
- List of bacon dishes
- List of ice cream flavors
- Bacon sundae
- Beer ice cream
- Chocolate-covered bacon
- Bacon mania
- 2010s in food
