= Tuile =

French wafer

Tuiles
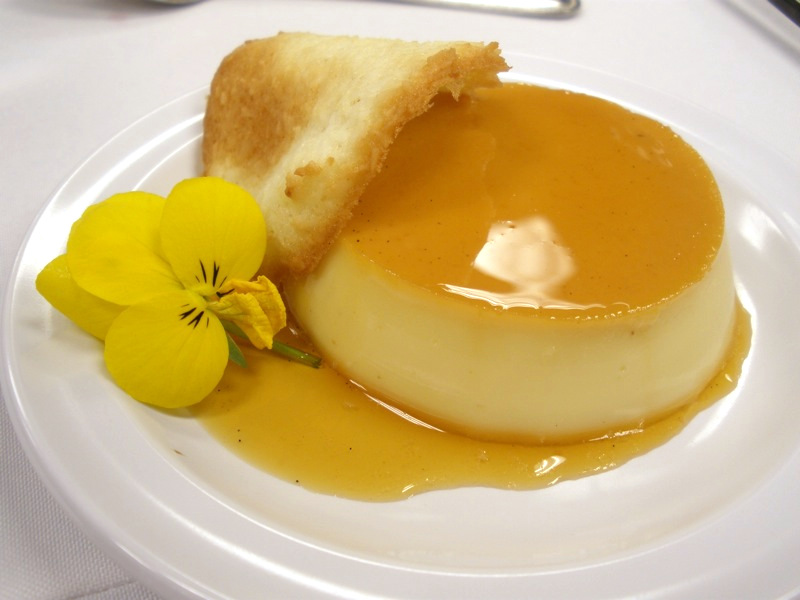
- A tuile arced over a creme caramel dessert
- Type: Cookie or wafer
- Place of origin: France
- Main ingredients: White sugar, flour, butter

A tuile (/twiːl/) is a baked wafer, French in origin, generally arced in shape, that is made most often from dough (but also possibly from cheese), often served as an accompaniment of other dishes. Tuile is the French word for tile, after the shape of roof tiles that the arced baked good most often resembles. Tuiles are commonly added as garnishes to desserts such as panna cotta or used as edible cups for sorbet or ice cream.

== Preparation ==
Tuiles are thin cookies named for and curved like the tuiles, or tiles, that line the rooftops of French country homes, particularly those in Provence. To get a curved shape, tuiles are usually made on a curved surface, such as a wine bottle or rolling pin. In France, tuile molds are also sold. Tuiles must be curved while hot; otherwise, they will crack and break. Tuiles can also be left flat after baking or shaped into cones or cups.

The traditional tuile batter consists of white sugar, flour, melted butter, and sometimes egg whites. Modern variants include a wide variety of bases and flavours, such as vanilla, cocoa, almond, orange, or honey.

== Gallery ==
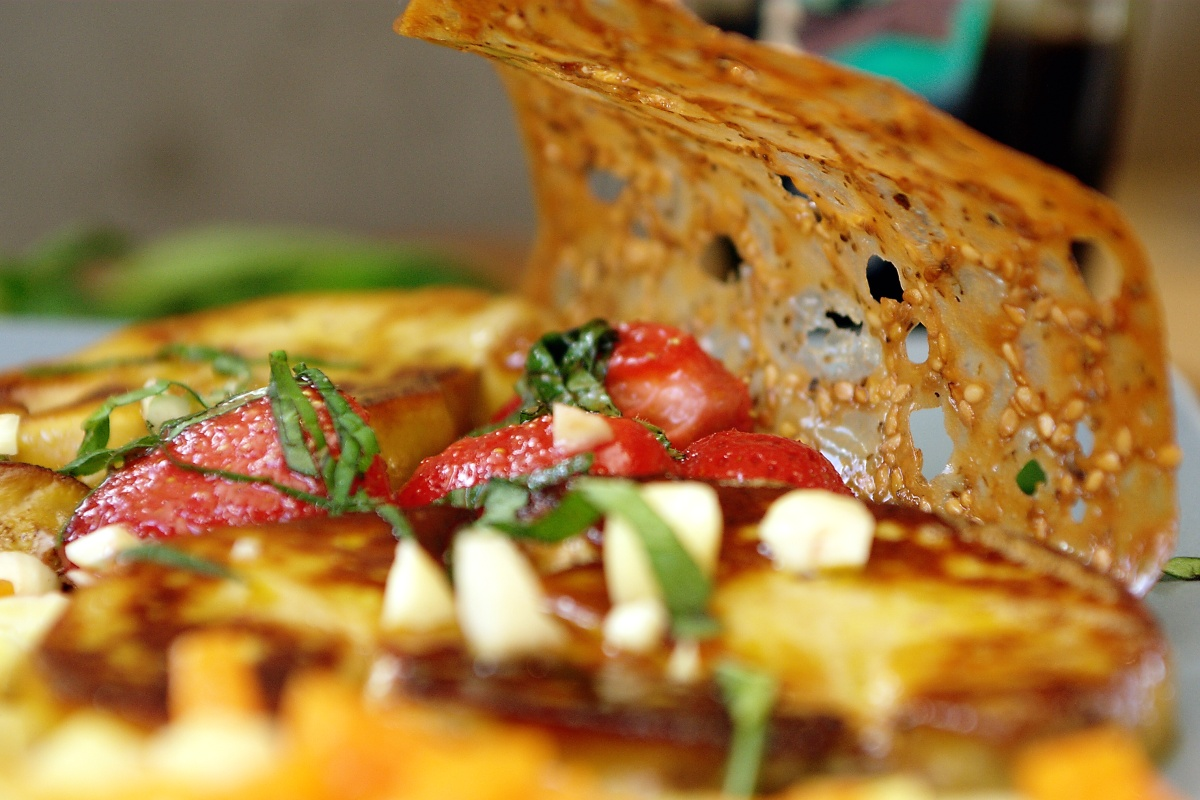
A simple bread tuile served with foie gras.

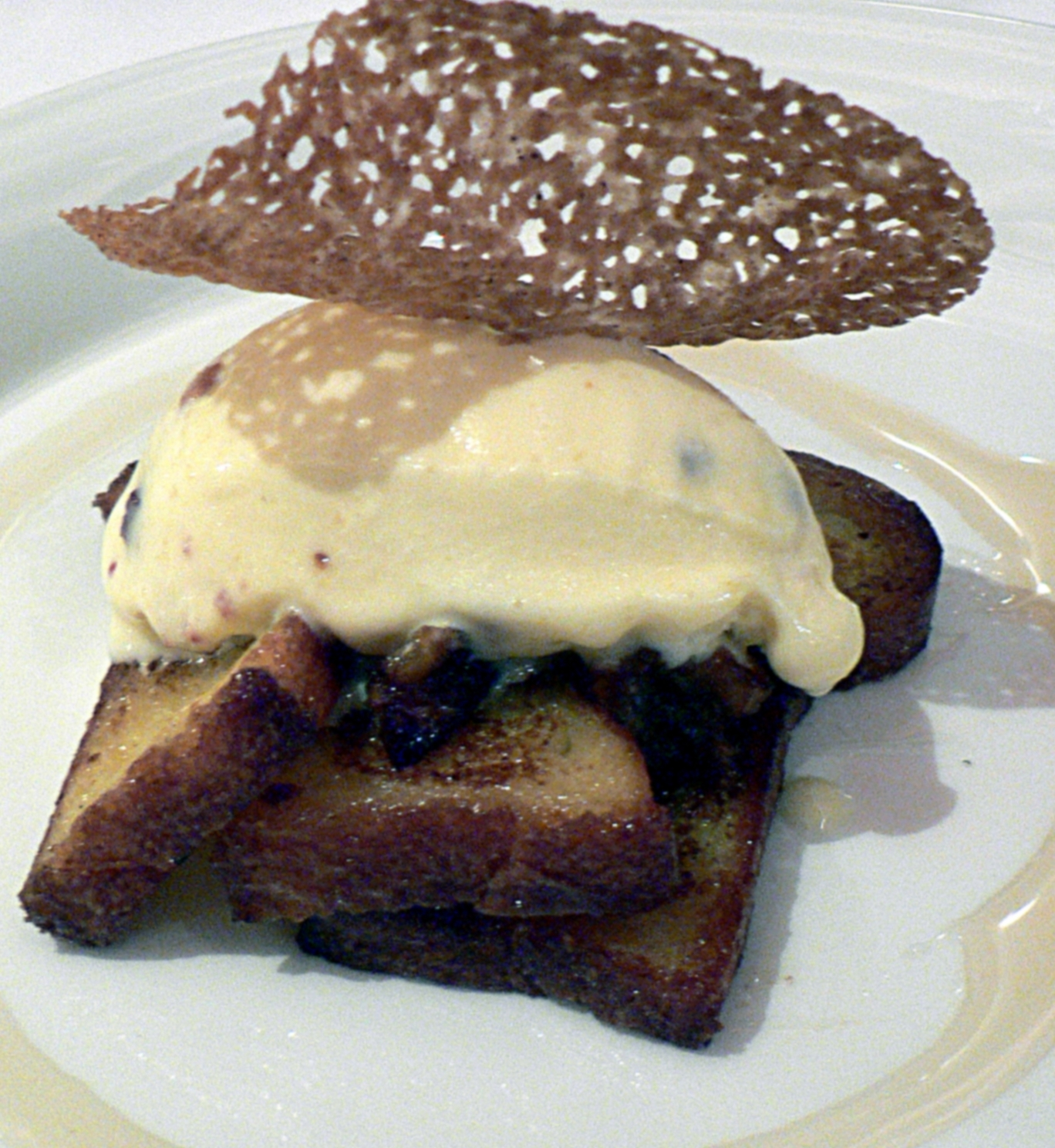
A cinnamon tuile over French toast and bacon ice cream.

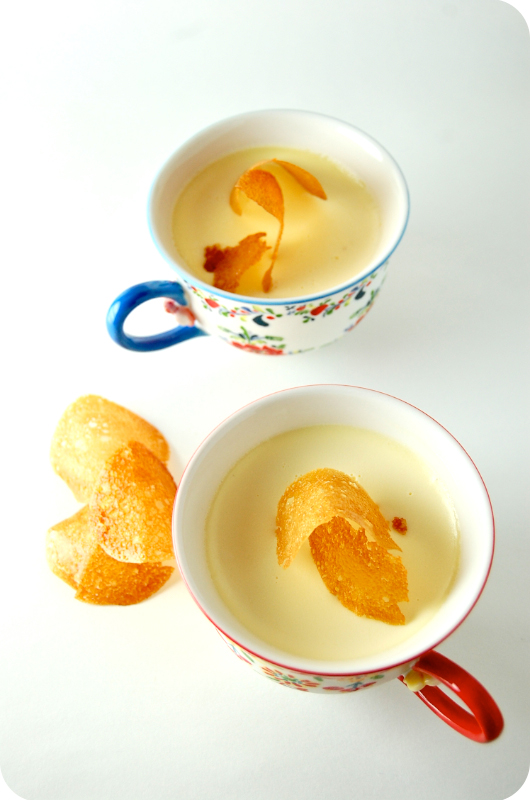
A honey tuile over cups containing a sweetened cream, ginger panna cotta.
