= Beer ice cream =

Ice cream made with beer

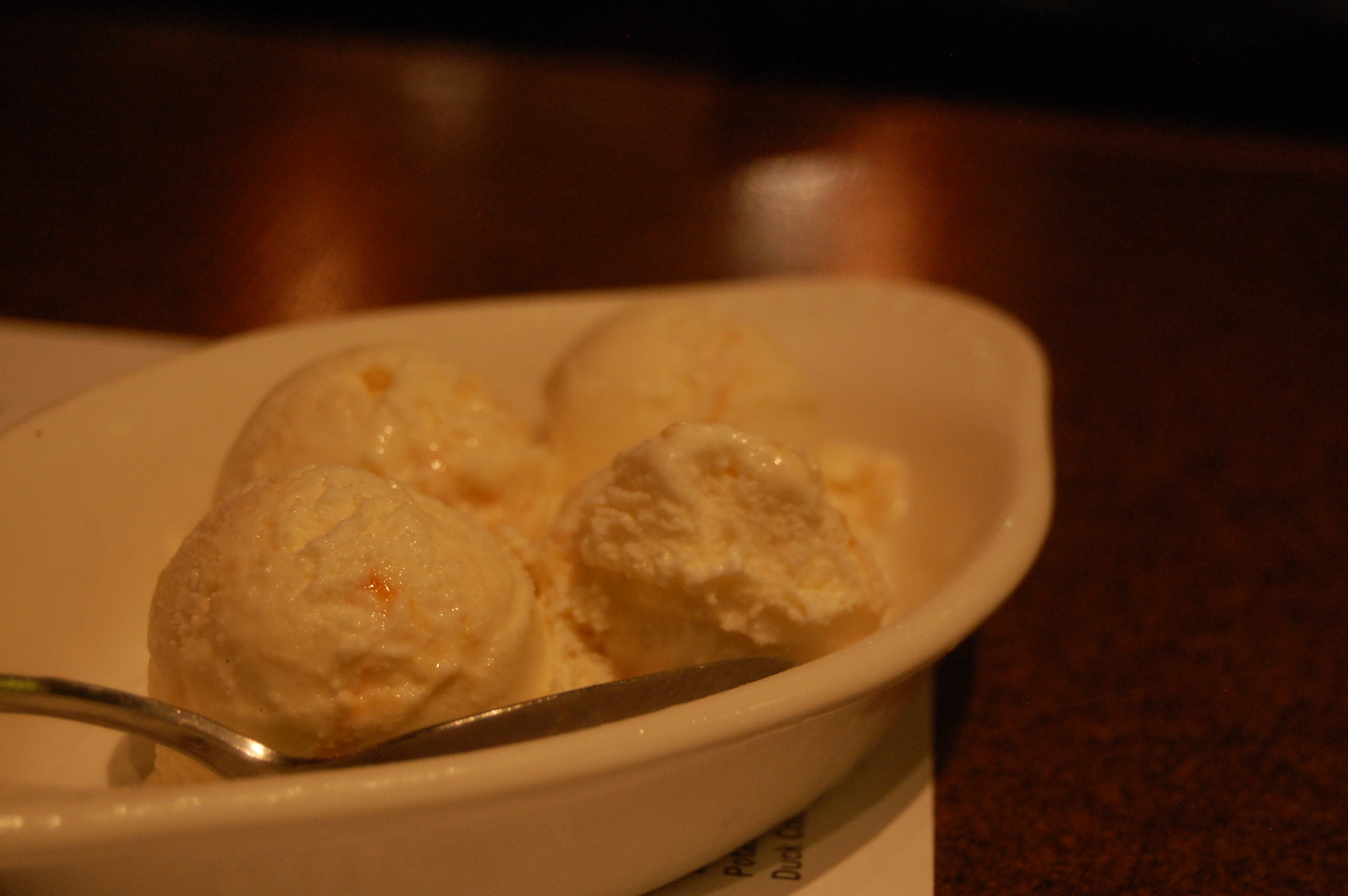
- Apricot and beer ice cream, prepared using Rockmill golden ale
- Type: Ice cream
- Course: Dessert
- Serving temperature: Frozen
- Main ingredients: Beer
- Similar dishes: Beer float

Beer ice cream is a type of ice cream prepared using beer as an ingredient. Beer ice cream prepared using darker beers typically has a more distinct flavor compared to that prepared using lighter beers. The alcohol in the beer is sometimes present in the finished ice cream, while other preparations involve cooking, which can evaporate the alcohol.

== Overview ==
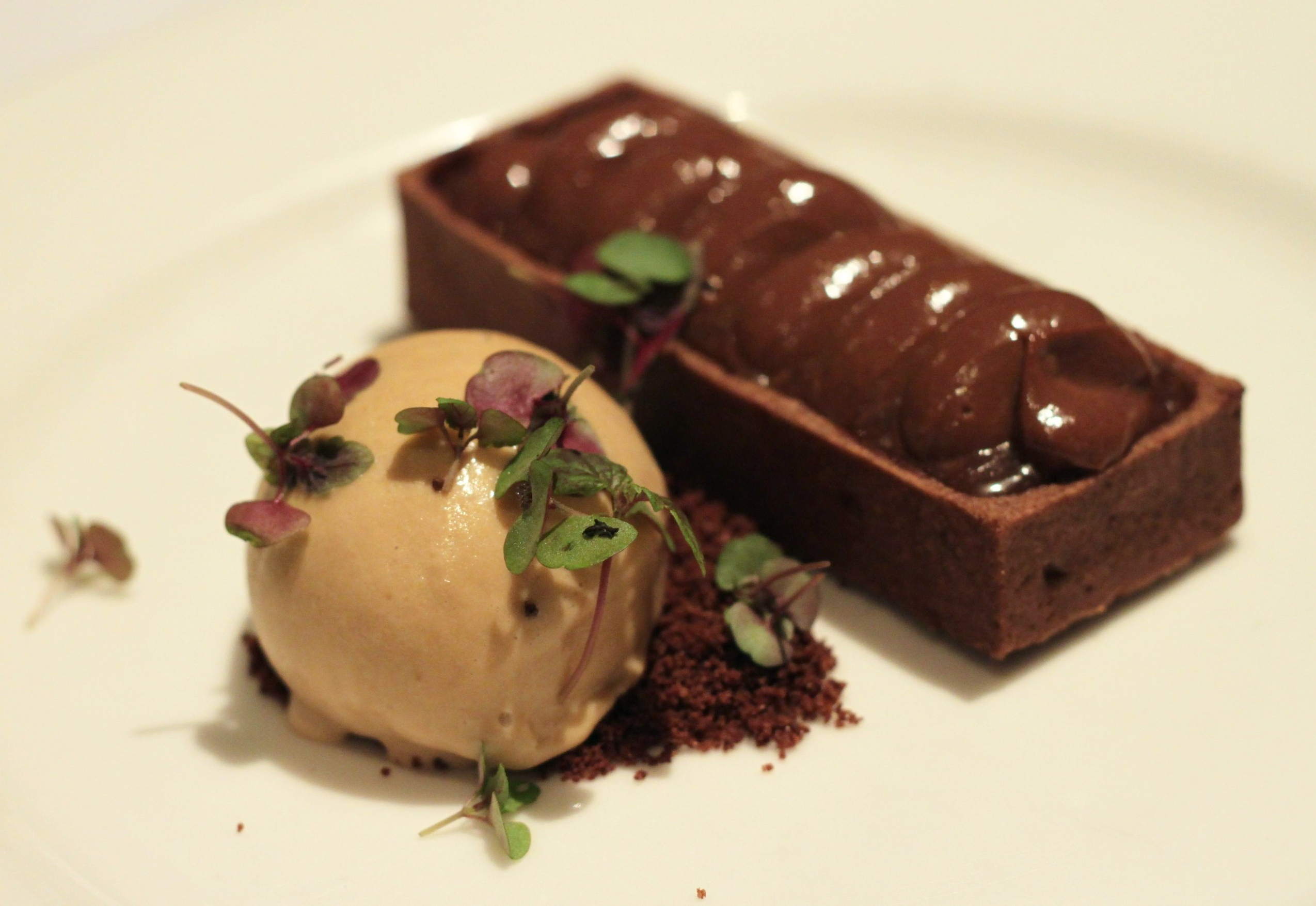
Beer ice cream with a tart

Beer ice cream is prepared using typical ice cream ingredients and beer. Various flavors are imparted to the ice cream based upon what type of beer is used. For example, the use of stout beer can impart a malty and caramel-like flavor, and the use of pilsner, India pale ale and pale ale can impart flavors of bitterness. India pale ale can also imbue malty flavors. Wheat beer and lagers can also be used as an ingredient in the dish. Lighter beers such as lagers do not impart as much flavor compared to darker beers and beers with a higher amount of malt and hops, which provide a more distinct flavor.

Various additional ingredients can be used, as occurs in other types of ice creams, such as chocolate, cherries, caramel, pecans, marshmallows and the like. Preparation of the dish can involve infusing the beer into pre-made ice cream, or making the ice cream with beer from scratch.

Some ice cream shops in the United States prepare and purvey beer ice cream, and the dish has been served at the Great American Beer Festival. Ben & Jerry's partnered with New Belgium Brewing Company in 2015 to create two limited edition beer ice creams prepared using New Belgium Brown Ale.

== Alcohol content ==
Beer ice cream sometimes retains the alcohol that is present in the beer, and beer ice cream prepared with beer with a high alcohol by volume content may not freeze entirely when using an ice cream maker. Some preparations of the dish involve cooking, which can evaporate the alcohol.

== Similar dishes ==
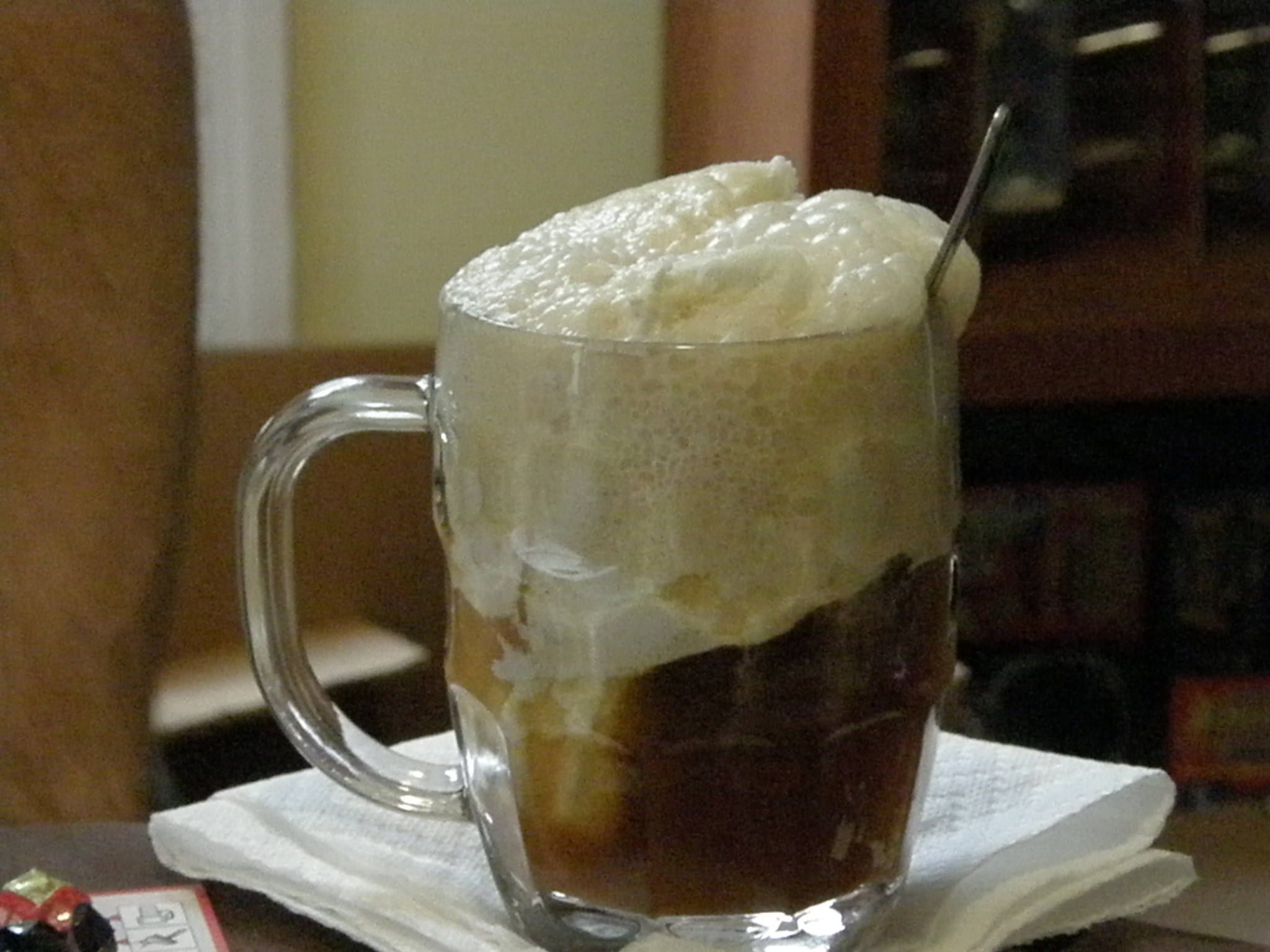
An ice cream float prepared with Samuel Adams beer and vanilla ice cream

An ice cream float can be prepared using beer. Root beer ice cream is a non-alcoholic dish prepared using root beer and typical ice cream ingredients.

== See also ==
- Bacon ice cream
- List of ice cream flavors
