= Všeradice =

- Municipality
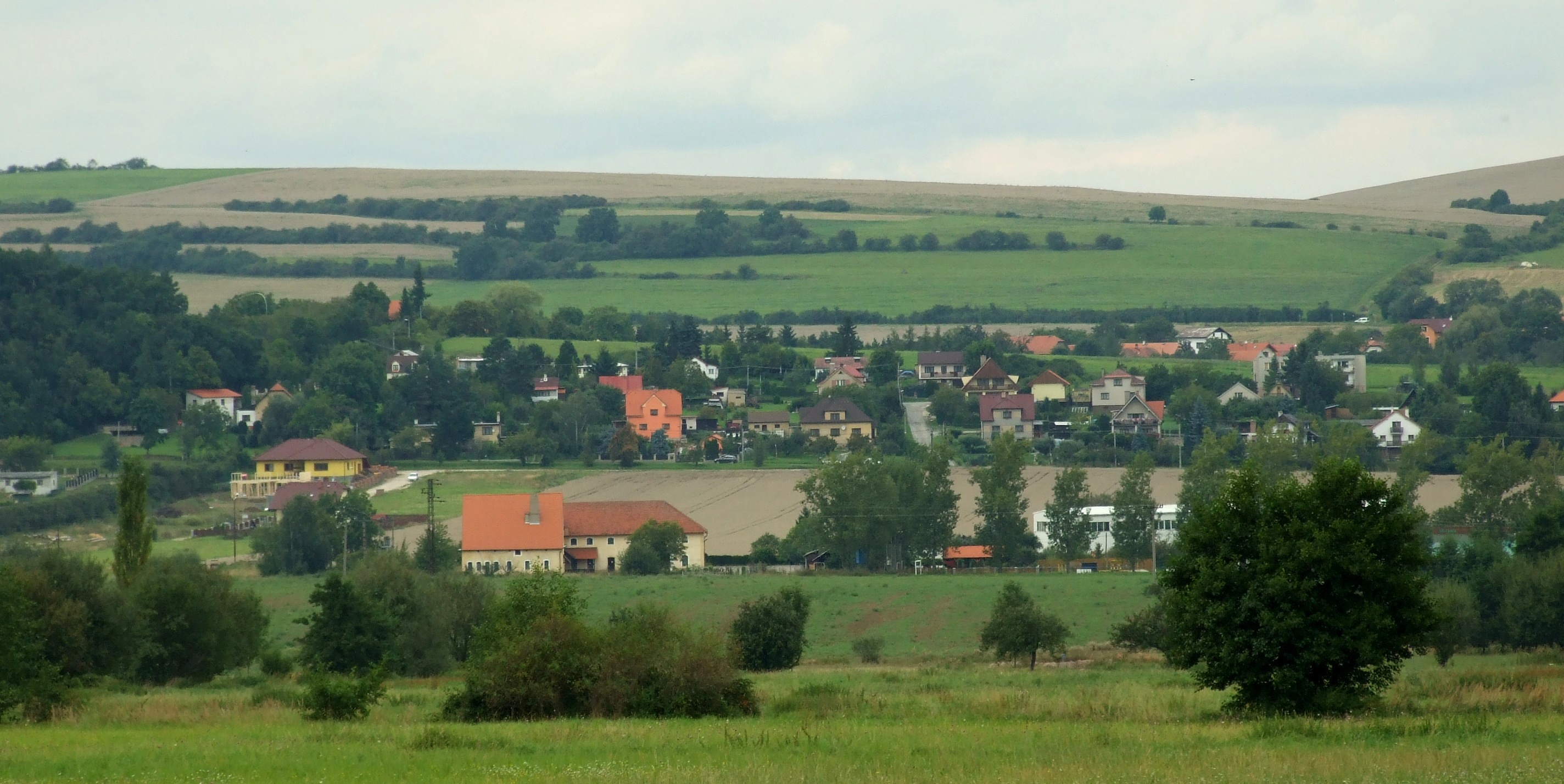
- View of Všeradice

- Flag Coat of arms

- Location in the Czech Republic
- Coordinates: 49°52′25″N 14°6′17″E
- Country: Czech Republic
- Region: Central Bohemian
- District: Beroun
- First mentioned: 1324

Area
  - Total: 7.37 km^{2} (2.85 sq mi)
- Elevation: 342 m (1,122 ft)

Population (2026-01-01)
  - Total: 480
  - Density: 65/km^{2} (170/sq mi)
- Time zone: UTC+1 (CET)
  - Summer (DST): UTC+2 (CEST)
- Postal code: 267 26
- Website: www.vseradice.cz

Všeradice is a municipality and village in Beroun District in the Central Bohemian Region of the Czech Republic. It has about 500 inhabitants.

== Demographics ==
Historical population
| Year | Pop. | ±% |
|---|---|---|
| 1869 | 693 | — |
| 1880 | 702 | +1.3% |
| 1890 | 646 | −8.0% |
| 1900 | 645 | −0.2% |
| 1910 | 600 | −7.0% |
| 1921 | 561 | −6.5% |
| 1930 | 534 | −4.8% |
| 1950 | 416 | −22.1% |
| 1961 | 432 | +3.8% |
| 1970 | 434 | +0.5% |
| 1980 | 418 | −3.7% |
| 1991 | 389 | −6.9% |
| 2001 | 415 | +6.7% |
| 2011 | 435 | +4.8% |
| 2021 | 449 | +3.2% |
Source: Censuses

== Notable people ==
- Magdalena Dobromila Rettigová (1785–1845), writer

== Twin towns – sister cities ==
Všeradice is twinned with:

- Gârnic, Romania
