= House of Flavors =

American ice cream manufacturer company

Coordinates: 43°57′21.1″N 86°27′08.8″W

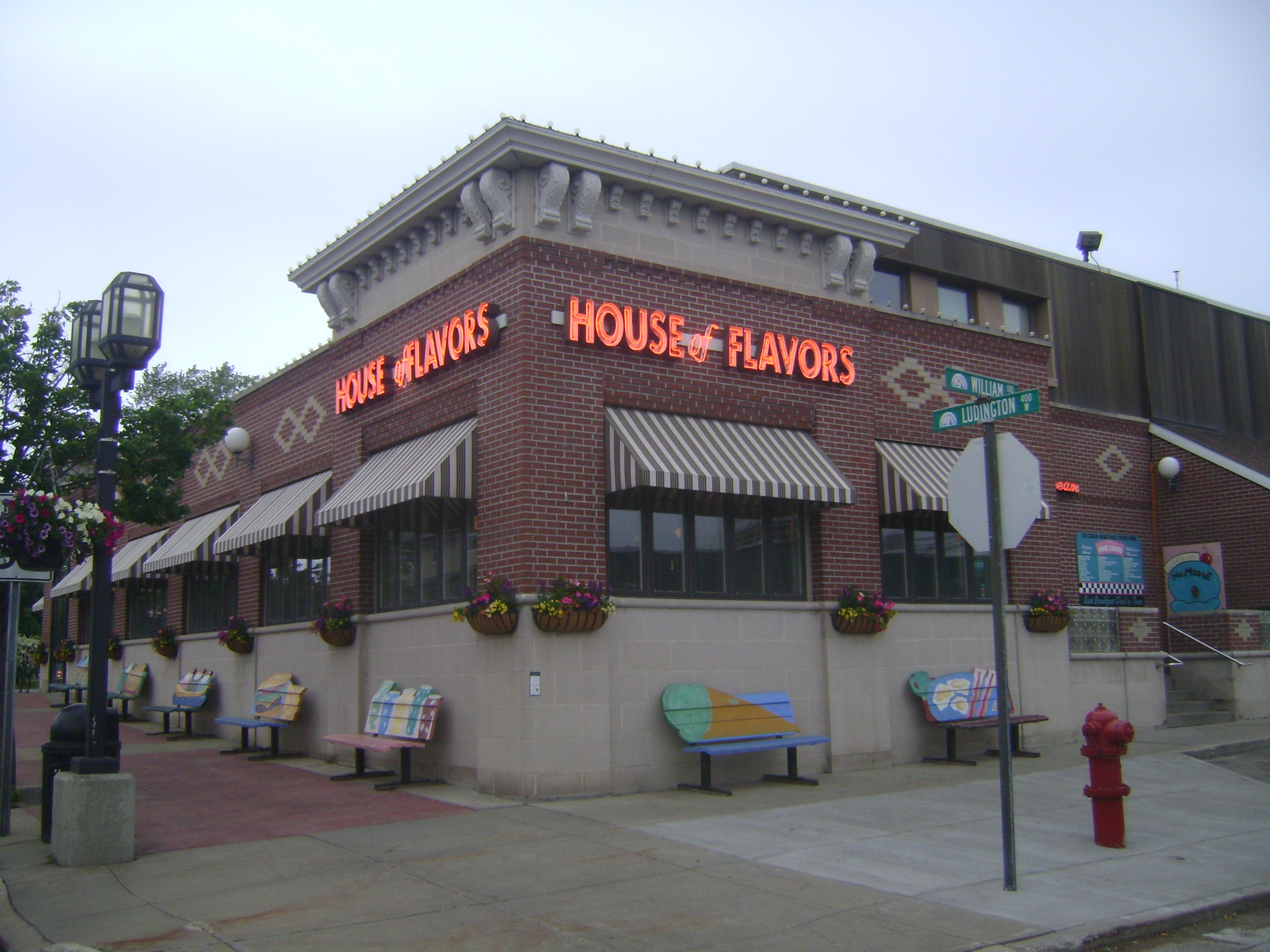
- House of Flavors painted up sitting benches outside in front of the ice cream parlor
- Type: Private
- Industry: Restaurants
- Founded: 1929; 97 years ago Ludington, Michigan, U.S.
- Founders: Guy W. Hawley; Roland Benedict; Albert Bradshaw
- Products: Ice cream Dairy; Snack
- Website: houseofflavors.com

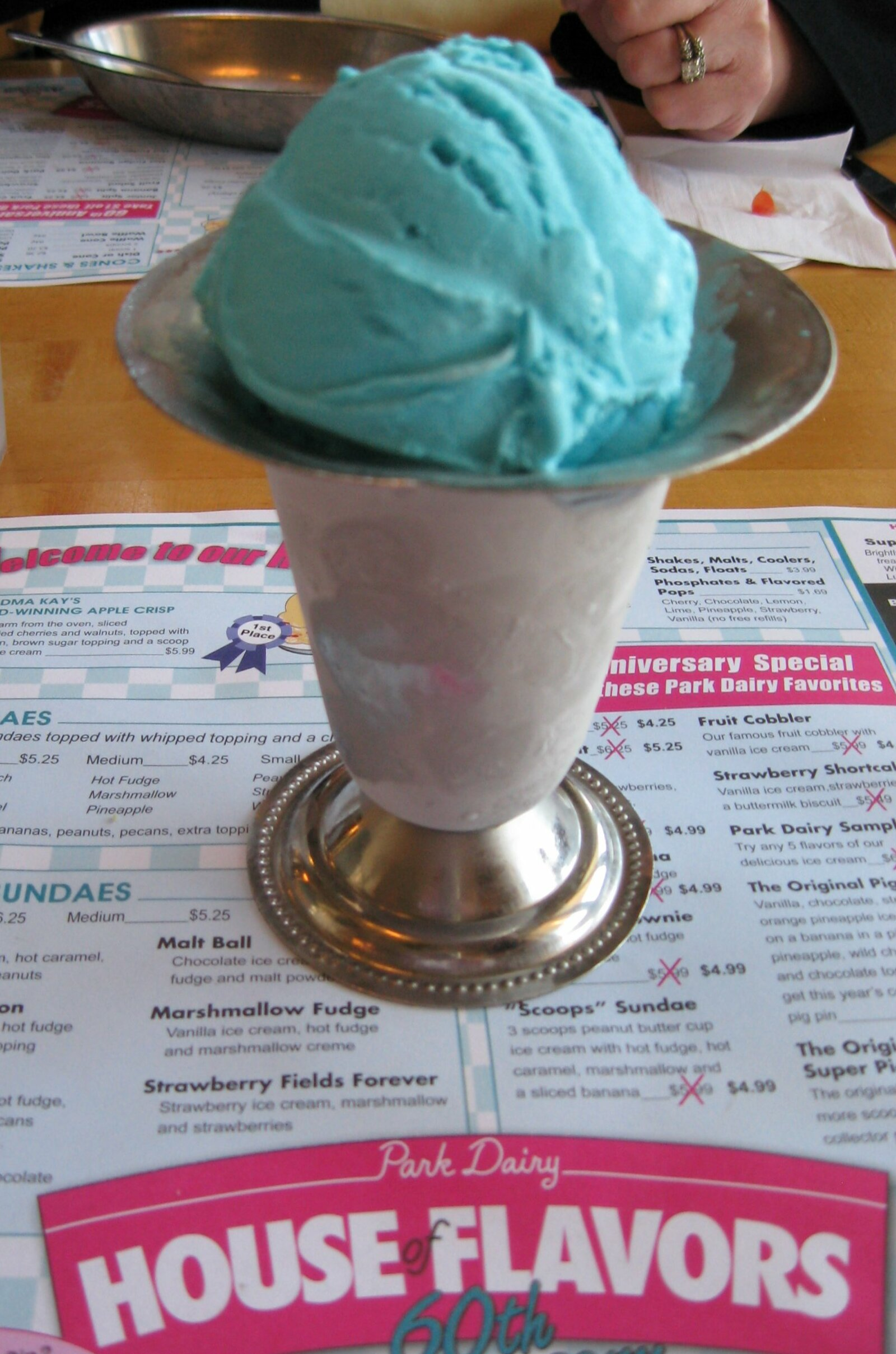
Blue Moon flavor

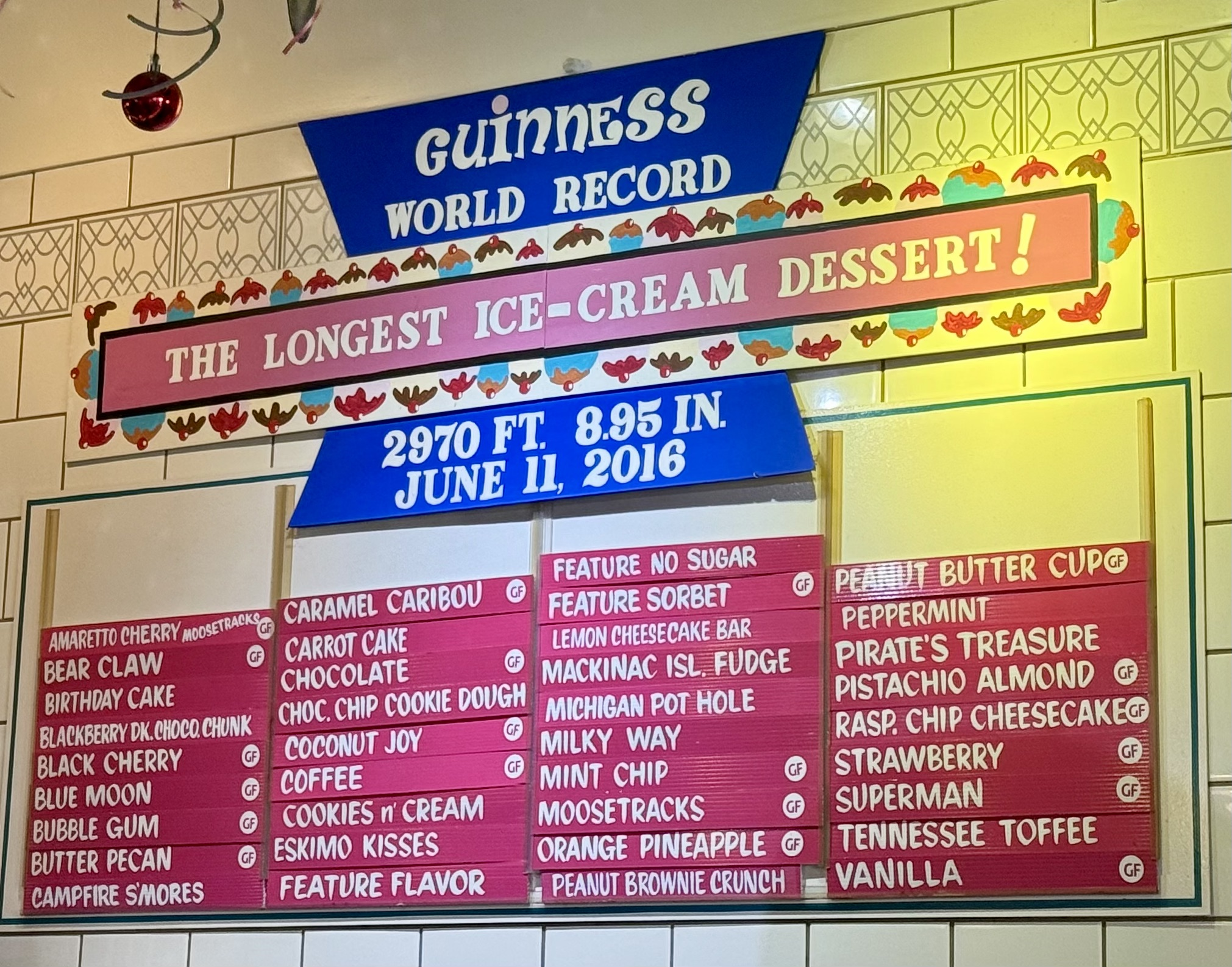
House of Flavors menu

House of Flavors is a manufacturer and retailer of ice cream based in Ludington, Michigan. It started as a dairy business as part of a farm operation before 1930. In 1935 the business had become known as Miller's Dairy and started expanding the operation. By the 1940s they processed milk, buttermilk, cottage cheese, and ice cream. In the late 1940s a businessman with a decade of dairy experience moved to Ludington from a city 60 miles south to become a partner of the existing business. He became the general manager and the name was changed to Park Dairy. The milk and butter segments of the business were sold off and the enterprise thereafter concentrated on just making ice cream.

A 1950s-themed ice cream parlor and restaurant is located in front on the main avenue of Ludington. Other stores were in Manistee, (Note: From 1948 to 2020 — now being torn down to make way for a casino.) and are in Pentwater and Zeeland, Michigan The ice cream manufacturing plant employing 150 people and making thousands of different ice cream flavors is behind taking up several city blocks. Their signature flavor is "Blue Moon" ice cream and they ship their ice cream products worldwide.

== History ==
House of Flavors was founded in 1929 by Guy W. Hawley at 402 West Ludington as a dairy business, which had no official name then, as it was part of a farm operation. Sometime after 1930, Hawley became partners with Roland Benedict and Albert Bradshaw. Albert Miller bought out Benedict and Bradshaw in 1935, and the dairy business became known as Miller's Dairy. In 1936, construction for a new 60-by-100-foot (18 by 30 m) building began for the expanded dairy business, and it was completed in 1937. The front of the building was located on Ludington Avenue and had a retail store that sold dairy products and coffee, while the back part of the building included the dairy bottling and packaging plant facilities. Later that year, the dairy, owned by Hawley and Miller, bought out two local ice cream companies.

Robert B. Neal ("Bob" Sr.), a man from Grand Haven, Michigan, who had a decade of dairy experience, moved to Ludington and partnered with the company. The name of Miller's Dairy was changed to Park Dairy since it was close to the main city park, and Neal became its general manager.

The name changed to House of Flavors in 1959, and Neal's son (Bob Jr.) became a partner with his father after graduating from college. The original packaging plant in Ludington remodeled and updated its equipment, and by 1972, the company had three dozen varieties of ice cream and was franchised to 40 retail stores throughout the state of Michigan. Today, they produce over 3 thousand different ice cream flavors, including 400 kinds of vanilla, for customers worldwide.

== Operations ==
Bob Sr. started playing a lesser role in the business in the early 1970s and semi-retired, and his son undertook most of the operations and opened twelve ice cream restaurant parlors with his friends through partnering with them, although by 1980, this partnership dissolved. Afterward, many of the parlors became privately owned restaurants, and some continue to have the franchised "House of Flavors" name, with the original company packaging ice cream for the businesses still under their labels. As of 2016, the ice cream manufacturing plant in Ludington employs around 150 people.

House of Flavors sells Blue Moon ice cream throughout the United States, and it has inspired their ice cream cone mascot "Mr. Moonie" that they introduced in 1996.

In the 1950s and 60s, Life Magazine featured House of Flavors in an article of its history. The cover of the magazine included photos of the local children blowing their paper straw coverings onto the ceiling, where they stuck.

== Guinness Record 2016 ==
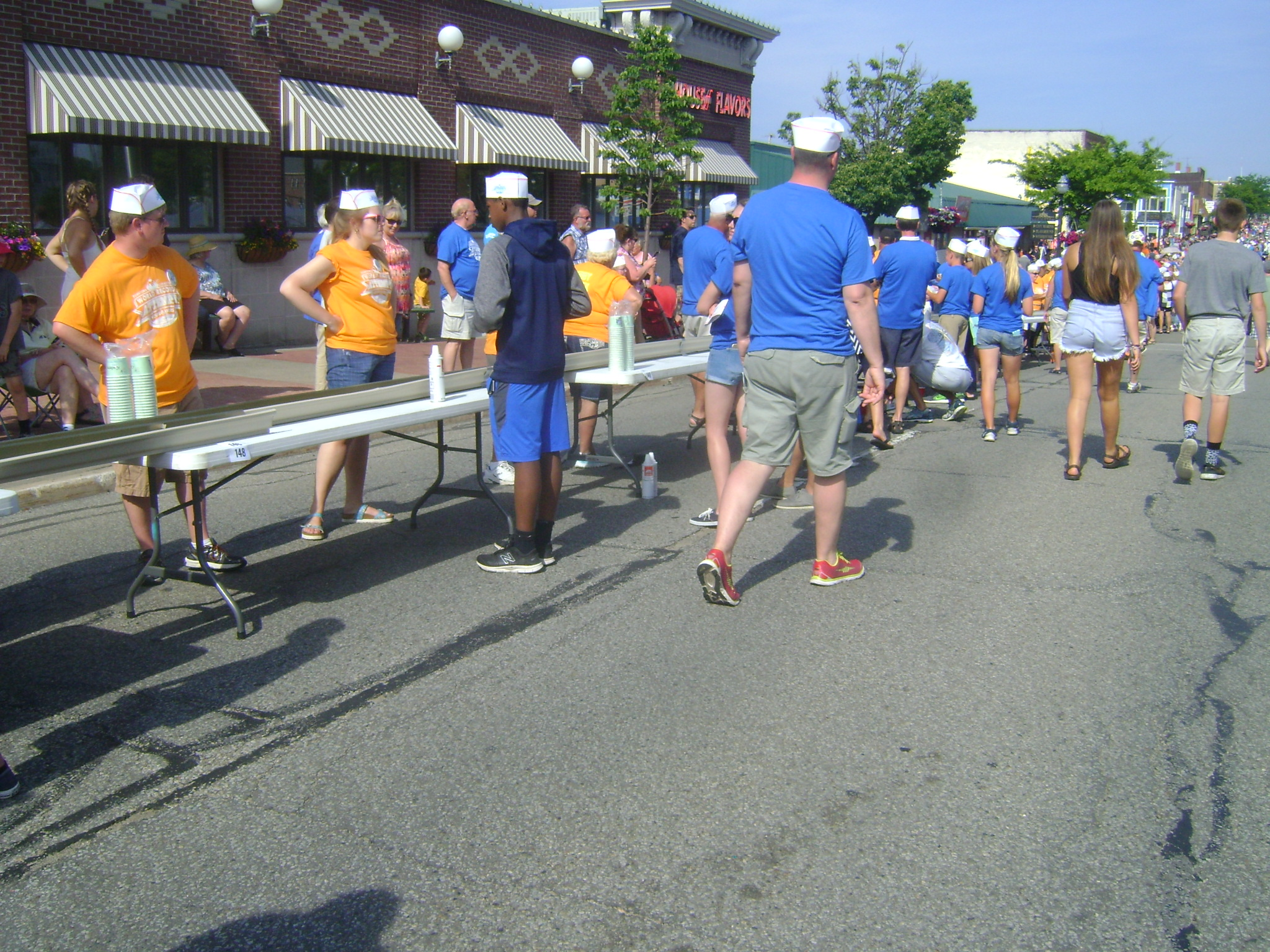
Preparation for world's longest dessert

On June 11, 2016, House of Flavors broke the Guinness Record for the world's longest ice cream dessert, constructing a dessert of Blue Moon, mint, and vanilla ice cream over a half mile long from Ludington Avenue from Park Ave to Harrison St. The ice cream was distributed along eight city blocks for 2970 feet, where thousands of people consumed the ice cream from around 18,000 cups.

The feat took months of planning and preparation, and the dessert consisted of nine hundred gallons of ice cream, eight hundred pounds of chocolate syrup, six hundred containers of whipped cream, and around two thousand Michigan maraschino cherries. The previous world record length for an ice cream dessert was 1,957 feet (596 meters), set in 2015. It took fifteen hundred volunteers to make the dessert and hand them out to residents, and many of the event promoters wore pirate costumes, including Michael Bean. A group of engineers and officials oversaw that the Guinness guidelines were followed, which became known as an official Guinness World Record on October 19, 2016. On March 24, 2018, the record has since been broken by Spirit of Texas Festival
