= Moon mist =

Canadian ice cream flavour

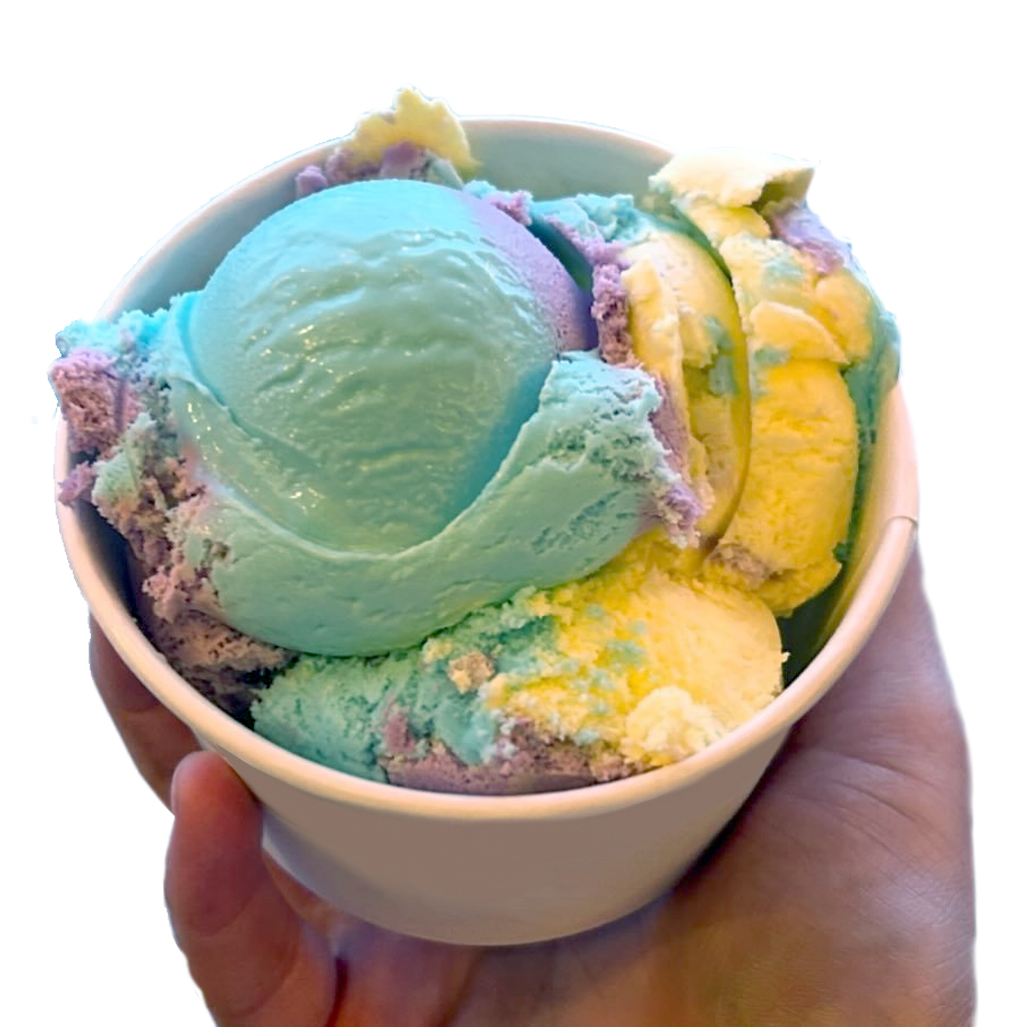
- Type: Ice cream
- Region or state: Eastern Canada

Moon mist is an ice cream flavour popular in the Atlantic Canadian provinces of Nova Scotia, Prince Edward Island, and New Brunswick, as well as Newfoundland and Labrador. Believed to have been created in Nova Scotia in the 1960s, the ice cream is an unusual combination of banana, grape and bubble gum flavours and is sold by many of the large regional dairy producers. These flavours are not fully blended together. For some local ice cream parlors, moon mist is amongst the most popular flavours sold. It is so popular that some fans will dye their hair in tribute to its three pastel colors.

== Cultural significance ==
In 2020, during the COVID-19 pandemic in Nova Scotia, Halifax ReTales, a website dedicated to tracking retail and restaurant businesses in the Halifax Regional Municipality, began selling Melissa Buote-designed moon mist-themed merchandise amongst other products as a way to raise funds for local non-profit organizations.

== Farmers Moon Mist ==
One of the biggest brands in the region that sells moon mist is Farmers, which is owned by the Quebec-based Agropur Dairy Cooperative. The Moon Mist product was obtained by Agropur after they purchased Nova Scotia-based dairy producer Scotsburn in January of 2017.

== See also ==
- Blue moon (ice cream)
