= Superman (ice cream flavor) =

Three-flavor ice cream of red, yellow, and blue

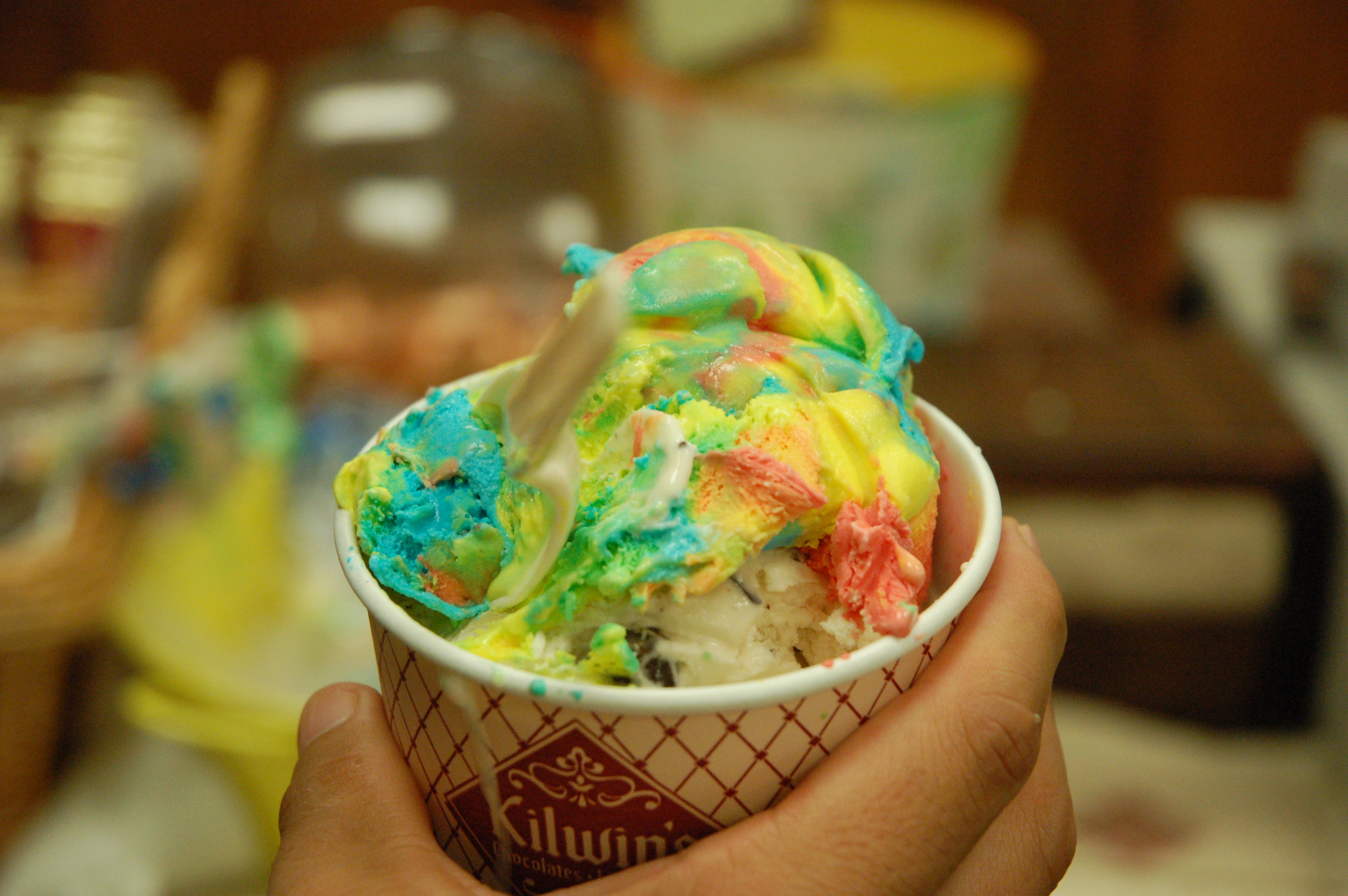
- Superman ice cream in a paper dish
- Type: Ice cream
- Region or state: Michigan

Superman ice cream is a three-flavor ice cream that usually appears in red, blue, and yellow. The flavor originated in the Midwestern United States, seen frequently in Michigan, Wisconsin, and Ohio. It can also be found in various ice cream parlors across the United States.

Although the flavor originated before the debut of Superman in 1938, it became associated with him due to his matching costume colors. As the character's name was never officially licensed, most producers sell the flavor under different brand names to avoid potential trademark or copyright issues.

The exact flavor mixture is not as well defined as the color scheme, and different brands often vary the flavor components used to make up the swirl. Many of the traditional versions call for Blue Moon as the blue component of the swirl. Blue Moon has a hard-to-place flavor and, like the Superman flavor which often incorporates it, was created in the early 20th century. The Blue Moon flavor can also be found around the United States in ice cream parlors which serve Hershey's ice cream, as well as select grocery stores and gas stations.

The combination is commonly believed to have originated in Detroit, Michigan, at Stroh's Ice Cream during the Prohibition Era, but this is unconfirmed.

== List of common brand and flavor combinations ==
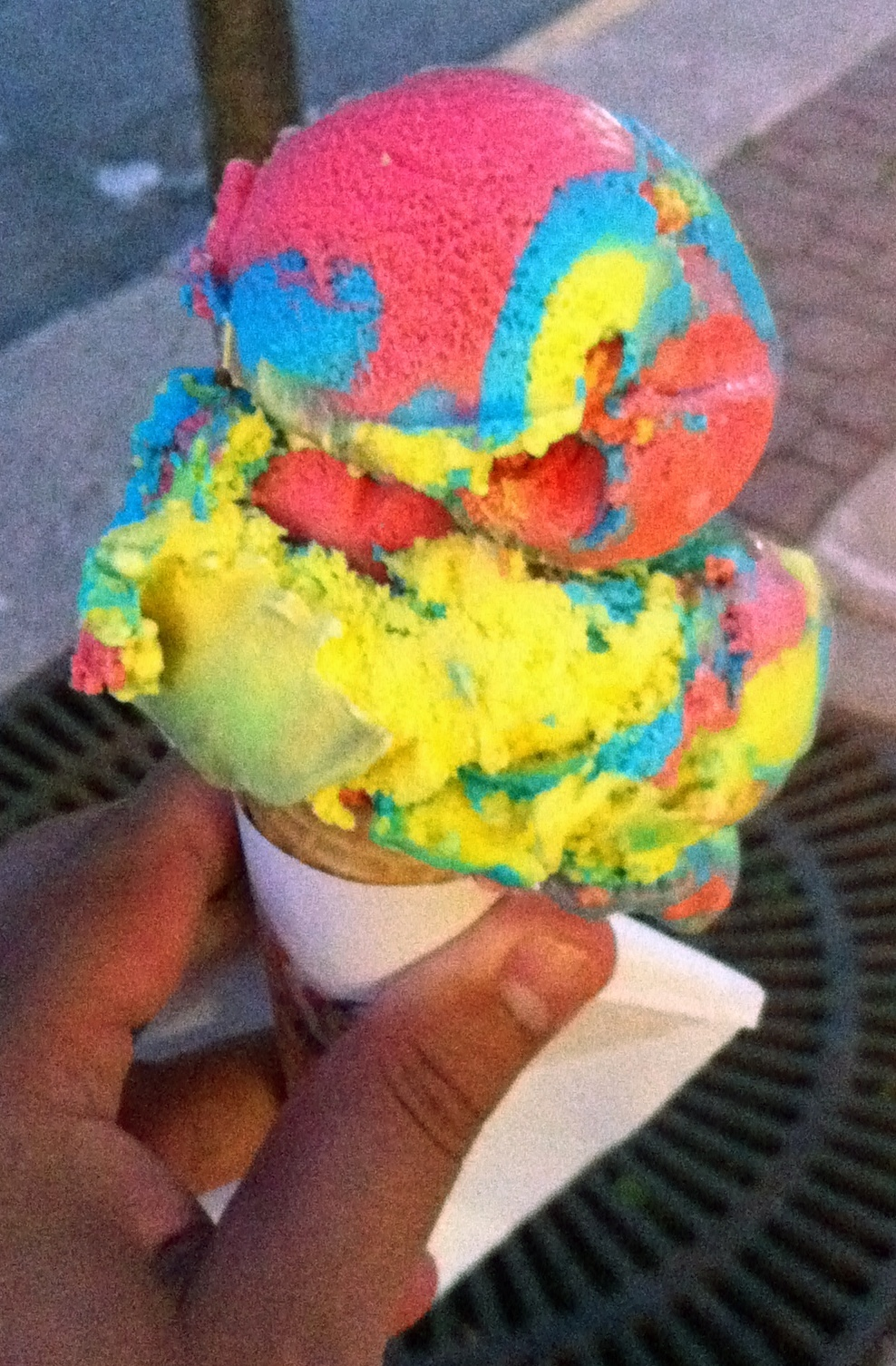
Superman ice cream in a cone

Producer	Brand Name	Blue Flavor	Red Flavor	Yellow Flavor	Reference
Ashby Ice Cream	"Superman"	Bubble gum blue	Strawberry red	fluorescent lemon yellow	
Chocolate Shoppe Ice Cream Company	"Super Human"	Blue Moon	Cherry	Vanilla	
Dean Foods	"Super Rainbow"	Blue Moon	Red pop	Vanilla	
Southeastern Grocers	"Super Kaboom"	Blue Moon	Cherry	Lemon	
Stroh's Ice Cream	"Super Rainbow"	Blue Moon	Red Pop	Lemon	
United Dairy Farmers	"Super Moo"	Blue Vanilla	Cherry	Vanilla	
Hudsonville Ice Cream	"SuperScoop"	Blue Moon	Black Cherry	Vanilla	
Meijer (Purple Cow)	"Scooperman"	Blue Moon	Black Cherry	Vanilla	
Cedar Crest Ice Cream	"Superman"/"Super Madness"	Blue Raspberry	Cherry	Vanilla	
Laura Secord Chocolates	"Super Kid"	Blueberry	Strawberry	Banana	
Kroger	"Tie Dye Burst"	Blue Moon	Cherry	Vanilla	
Perry's Ice Cream	"Super Hero"	Blue Raspberry	Cherry Bubble Gum	Lemon	
Well's Blue Bunny	"Scooper Hero"	Vanilla	Vanilla	Vanilla	
Hershey Creamery Company	"Superman"	Blue Moon	Strawberry	Banana	
HyVee (It's Your Churn)	"Scooper Powers"	Fruit Punch	Fruit Punch	Fruit Punch	
Kilwins	"Superman"	Fruity Blue	Fruity Pink	Fruity Yellow	

== See also ==
- List of ice cream flavors
