= Caramel ice cream =

Ice cream flavor

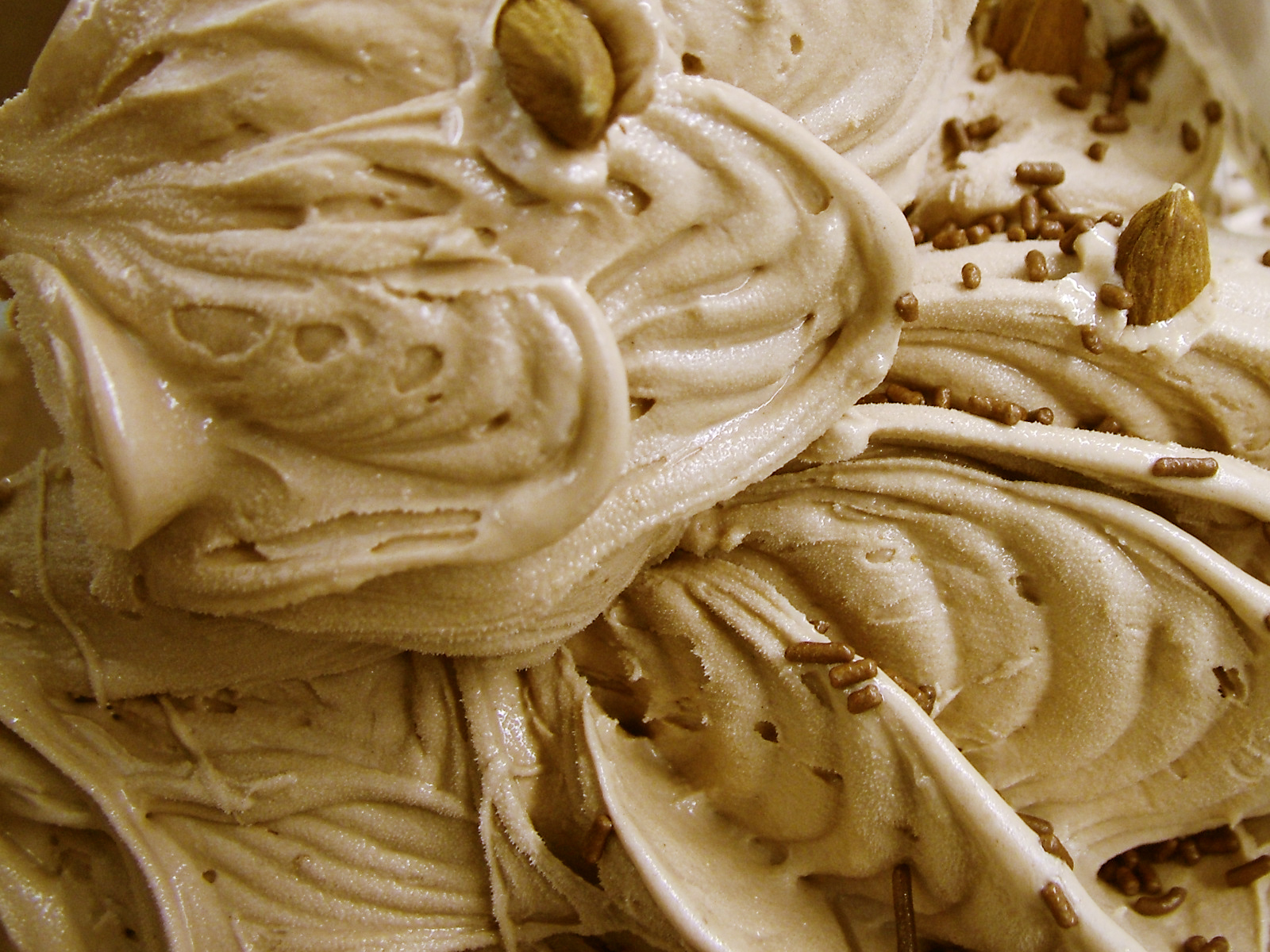
Caramel ice cream with nuts

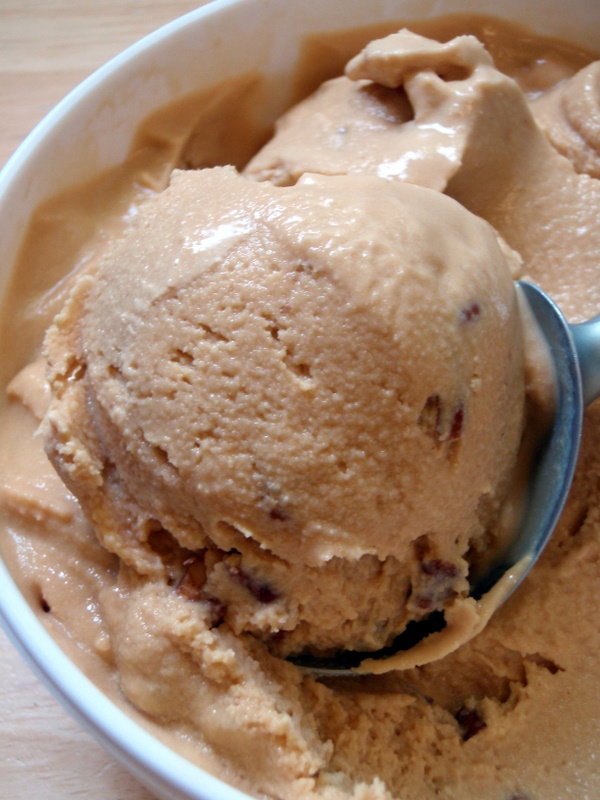
Dulce de leche ice cream

Caramel ice cream is an ice cream flavored with caramel. It is typically prepared using a base made from cream and eggs, to which caramel is added, often in the form of salted caramel. Several variants of caramel ice cream exist. In the Río de la Plata region, ice cream made with dulce de leche (a sweet caramelized milk spread) is particularly popular. Other variants include caramel ice cream served with nuts or with pieces of chocolate.

Caramel is also frequently combined with other ice cream flavors, most commonly as a caramel sauce or as solid inclusions. A well-known example is New Zealand hokey pokey ice cream, which consists of vanilla ice cream containing pieces of honeycomb toffee.

One of the earliest known references to caramel ice cream dates to 1747 and appears in the English cookbook The Art of Cookery Made Plain and Easy by Hannah Glasse. A recipe for caramel ice cream is also included in the Czech cookbook of Magdalena Dobromila Rettigová from 1826. Salted caramel ice cream gained popularity at the end of the 20th century.
