= Tiger tail ice cream =

Canadian ice cream flavor

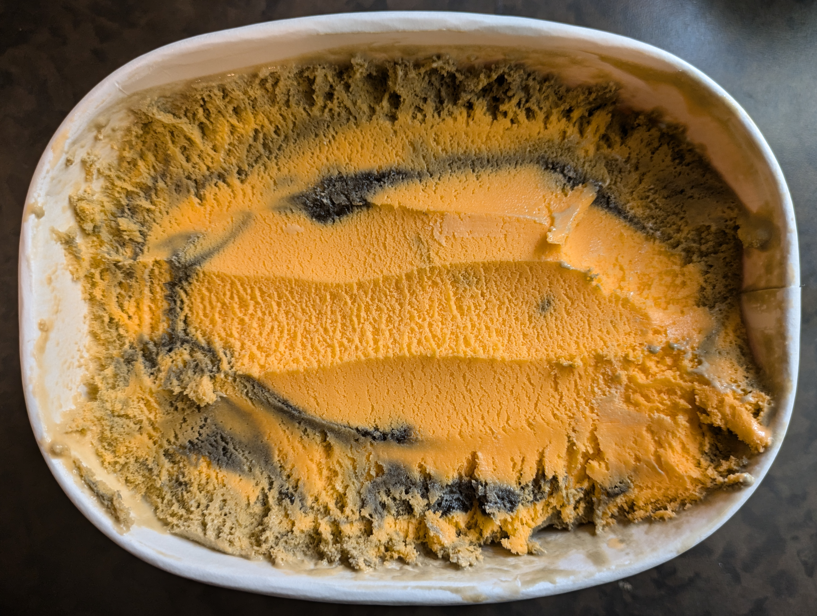
Squround container of tiger tail ice cream

Tiger tail ice cream, also called tiger tiger or tiger flavour, is a Canadian orange-flavoured ice cream with black liquorice swirl. It is named for its resemblance to orange and black tiger stripes. Tiger tail is most popular in Canada, particularly in southern Ontario and Atlantic Canada, and not often found elsewhere in the world. It is a distinctly flavoured ice cream. This flavour of ice cream is offered by companies such as Chapman's, Kawartha, and Nestlé. Tiger tail is considered a retro ice cream flavour, owing to its popularity from the 1950s to 1970s, and it has seen a nostalgia-related resurgence since the 2010s.
