= Lemon ice cream =

Flavor of ice cream

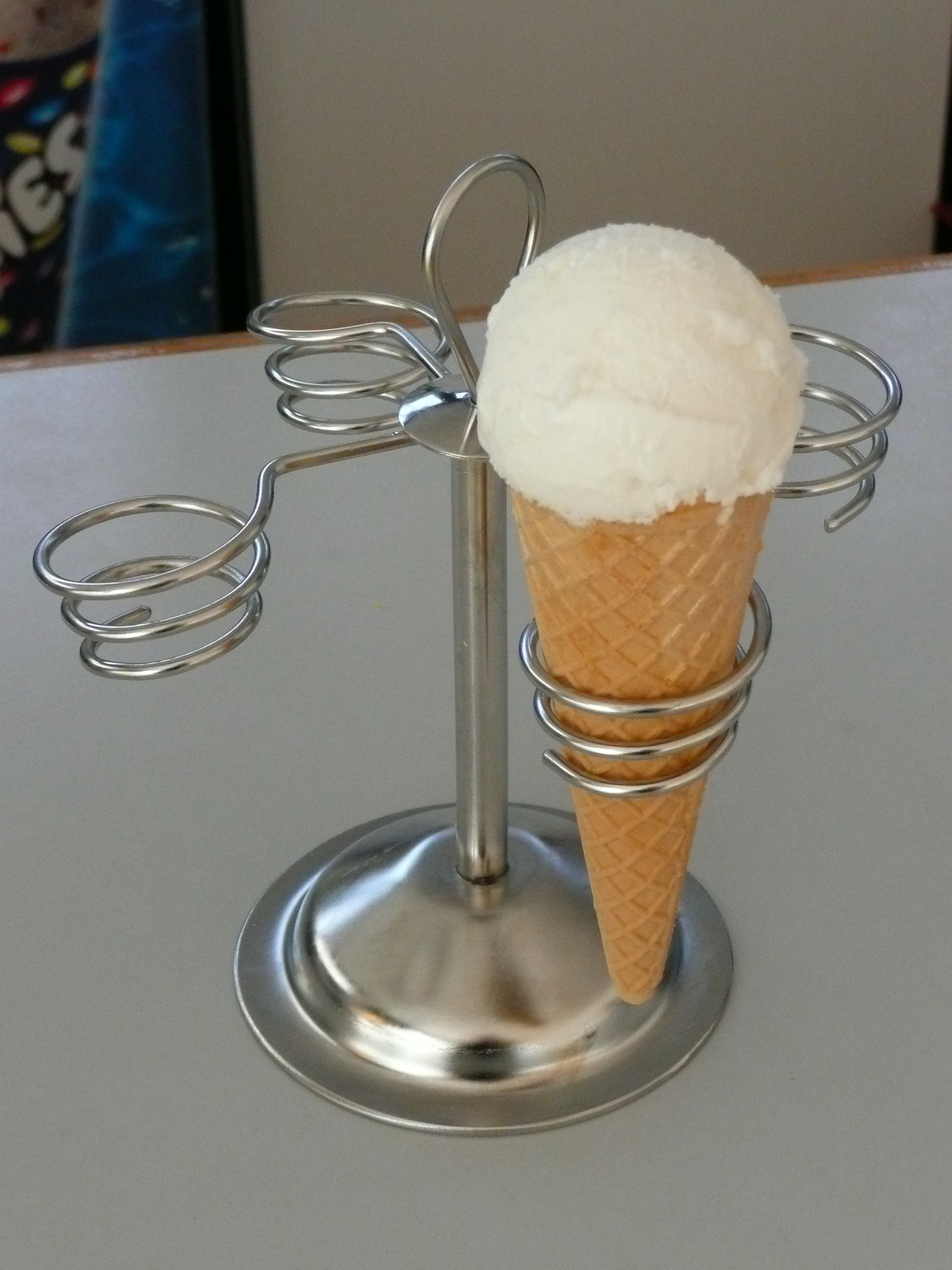
Lemon ice cream in a ice cream cone

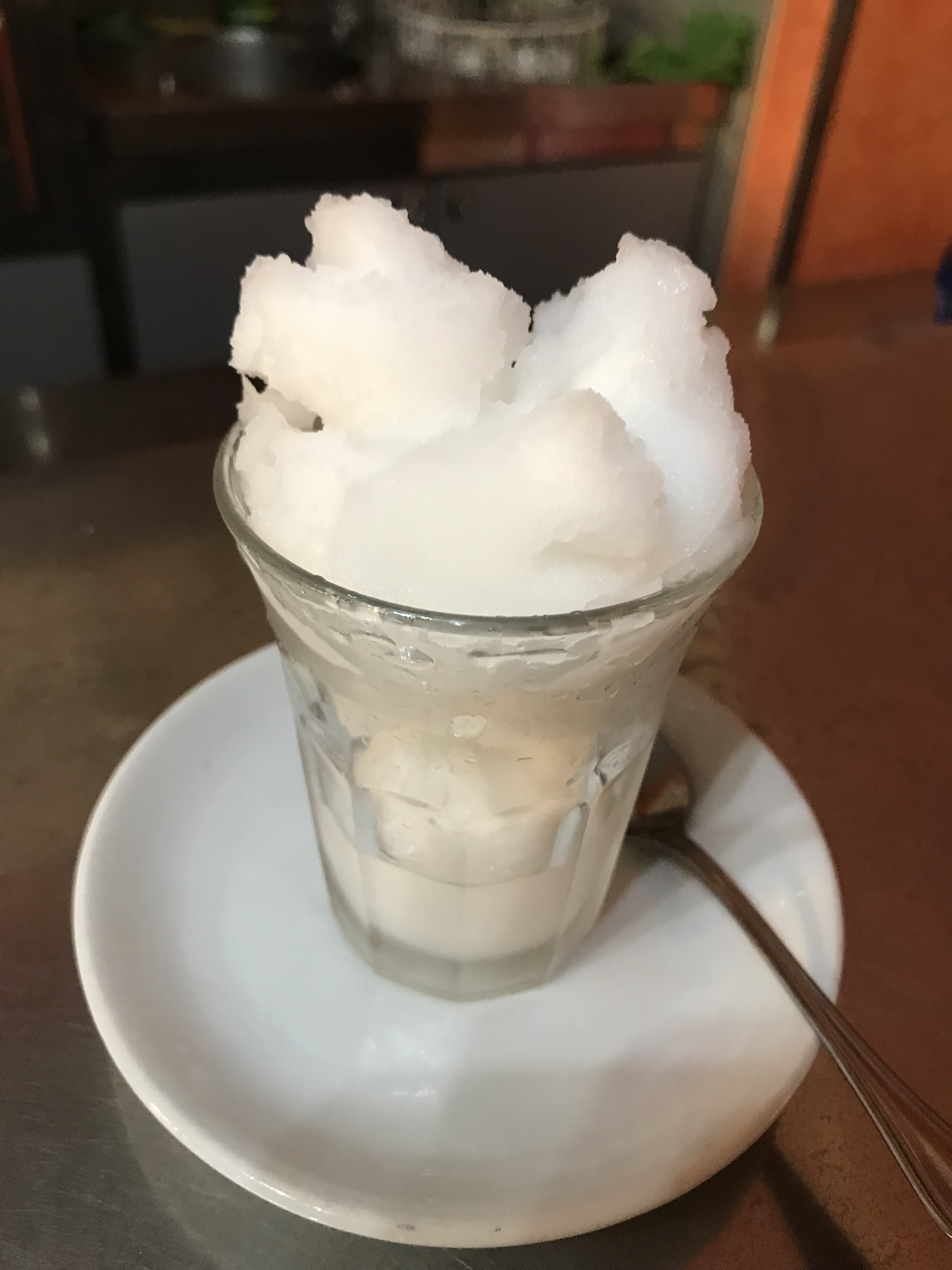
Sicilian granita

Lemon ice cream is a flavor of ice cream. It is typically made with a cream-based custard consisting of cream, sugar, and eggs, to which lemon juice and usually lemon zest are added. The zest contains aromatic essential oils that give the ice cream its characteristic lemon aroma. Lemon-flavored sorbets are also common. A Sicilian variation of lemon sorbet is granita. Lemon sorbet is also a local specialty and symbol of the Amalfi Coast, where it is often served inside a fresh lemon.

== History ==
Lemon-flavored frozen desserts are among the oldest precursors to modern ice cream. Cold desserts made from snow, honey, and citrus juice were known in antiquity in Mesopotamia, Persia, ancient Greece, and ancient Rome. During the Middle Ages, lemon sorbet became particularly popular in Sicily, where the Arabs had introduced lemon cultivation and snow could be obtained from Mount Etna. Lemon sorbet subsequently spread to other parts of Italy and became more widespread during the Renaissance, following the development of techniques for producing a cooling mixture from ice and salt.

Ice cream in forms closer to the modern dessert became increasingly popular from the 18th century onward. During the 19th century, lemon was one of the most popular ice cream flavors. Recipes for lemon ice cream appeared in numerous cookbooks of the period, including Directions For Cookery, In Its Various Branches by the American author Miss Leslie from 1840 or Domácí kuchařka by the Czech author Magdalena Dobromila Rettigová from 1826.
