= The Virginia House-Wife =

1824 cookbook by Mary Randolph

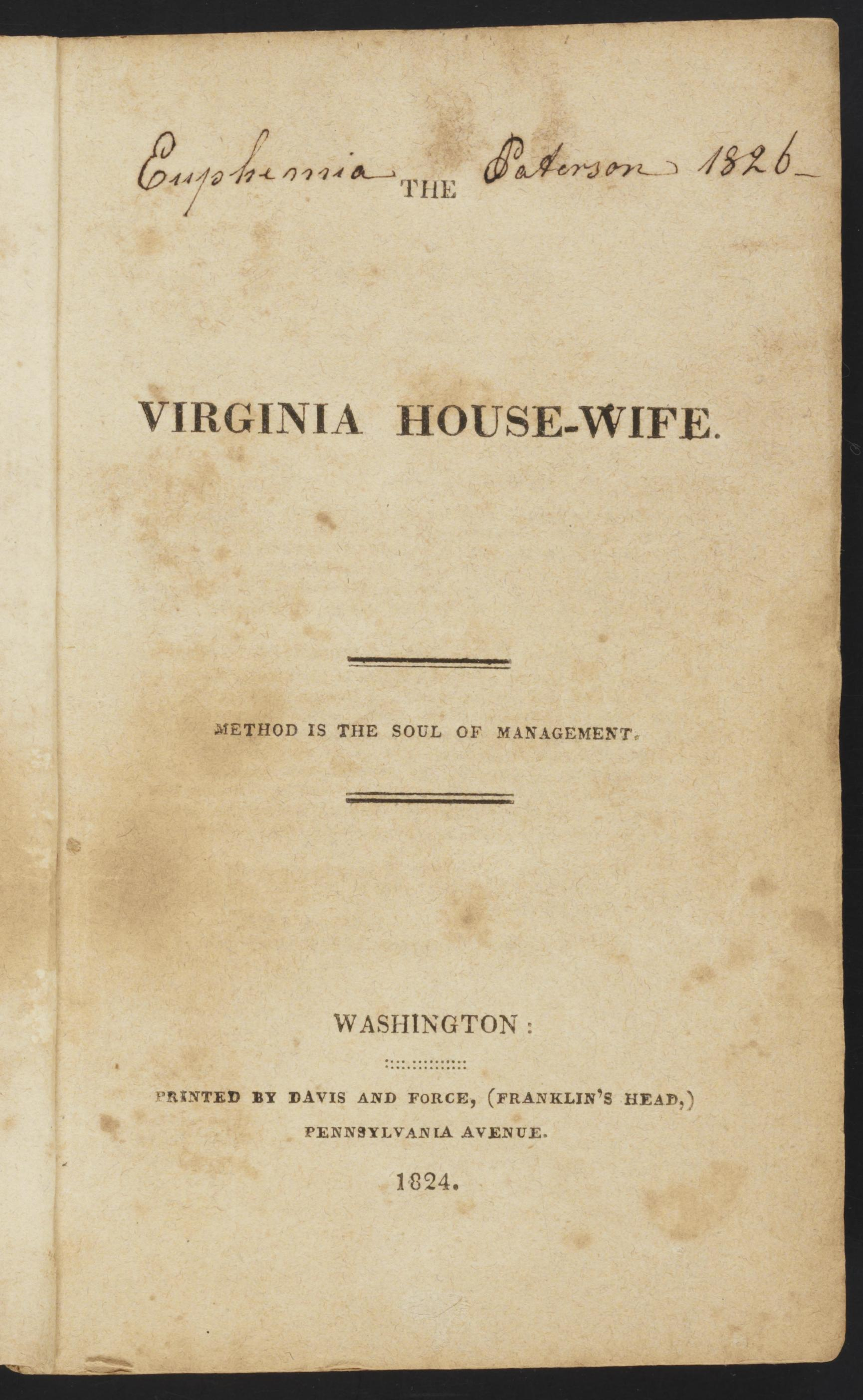
1824 title page

The Virginia House-Wife is an 1824 housekeeping manual and cookbook by Southern American cook and writer Mary Randolph. In addition to recipes it gave instructions for making soap, starch, blacking and cologne.

== Publication history ==
The Virginia House-Wife was first published in 1824; it was republished at least nineteen times before the outbreak of the Civil War. The book was 225 pages long, included nearly 500 recipes, and resulted from Randolph's "practical experience as keeper of a large establishment, and perhaps in the hope of further augmenting the family income." The Virginia House-Wife is considered the first regional American cookbook.

== Contents ==
According to historian Cynthia A. Kierner, "Randolph presented a southern — specifically, a Virginian — model for southern readers. Although her occasional explanations of uniquely southern foods suggests she anticipated an audience beyond her region, [Randolph's work] appealed to the women of the rural South who were the majority of her readers."

Randolph's recipes exhibited a uniquely Virginian style, using Virginia produce for dishes influenced by African, Native American, and European foods. The book included recipes for Southern classics such as okra, sweet potatoes, biscuits, cornmeal bread and barbecue shote (young pig), European influenced recipes included gazpacho, ropa vieja, polenta, and macaroni. Six curry recipes were included in The Virginia House-Wife; these were the first curry recipes published in the United States, and suggest curry was already a popular seasoning in the region. Specialties from other parts of the US include a recipe entitled "Dough Nuts - A Yankee Cake." The Virginia House-Wife included the first fried chicken recipe published in the US, though this recipe removed the seasonings in the earlier Scottish recipe and made the dish without seasonings. It also contained the first ice cream recipe published by an American author.

In addition to recipes, the book also explained how to make soap, starch, blacking and cologne.

Conventional wisdom has claimed that early Americans ate few vegetables and overcooked the few they did eat. The Virginia House-Wife gives recipes for dozens of vegetables and seventeen aromatic herbs. This dietary diversity can be confirmed with Thomas Jefferson's notes on the produce for sale in Washington's markets. Randolph specifically recommended short cooking times for asparagus and spinach; Karen Hess points out that overcooking did not become common until canning became a popular method of preservation in the mid-nineteenth century.

== Modern analysis ==
Although Randolph was a knowledgeable cook, the majority of the labor in her kitchen was done by Black women. While it is impossible know the nature of Randolph's relationship to these women, Melissa Blank of Colonial Williamsburg sees "evidence that enslaved cooks had a significant influence on how Mary prepared food." Karen Hess's introduction to the 1984 edition of the book notes, "The black presence was infinitely more subtle in Virginia cookery than in that of New Orleans or the West Indies, but ... the culture was sufficiently imbued with it to condition the palate of the entire community. Hess cites gumbo, eggplant, field peas, yams and possibly tomatoes as crops that accompanied enslaved Black people to the Americas. Hess also notes that the West Indies forged a connection between Spanish, French, Creole, and Southern cooking.

== See also ==
- Oyster ice cream, a recipe included in the cookbook
