= Bacon sundae =

Ice cream and bacon meal

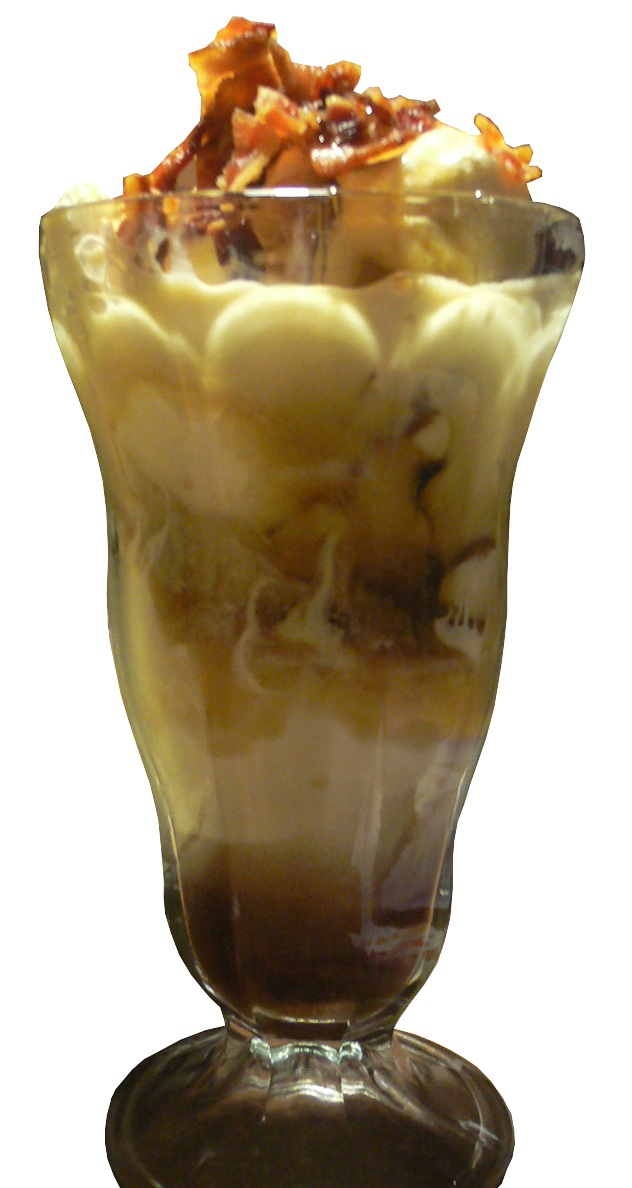
- Course: Dessert
- Main ingredients: Vanilla ice cream, hot fudge, caramel, bacon

The bacon sundae is a sundae prepared using typical sundae ingredients and bacon.

== At fast food restaurants ==
The bacon sundae was a product offering from Denny's in the U.S. in 2011, which purveyed a maple bacon sundae in 2011, part of its limited-time "Baconalia!: A Celebration of Bacon" menu.

The bacon sundae was also a product offering from Burger King for the summer of 2012 in the United States. Burger King's bacon sundae is made of vanilla soft serve ice cream and topped with hot fudge, caramel, bacon crumbles and a piece of bacon. The treat packed 510 calories, 18 grams of fat and 61 grams of sugar. It was first introduced in Nashville, Tennessee and was launched along with various BBQ sandwiches, sweet potato fries, and frozen lemonade.

== See also ==
- Bacon ice cream
