= Oyster ice cream =

Savory ice cream made from oysters

- Type: Ice cream
- Place of origin: United States

Oyster ice cream is a flavor of ice cream with a savory taste. After being recorded in a 19th-century cookbook, then forgotten for the next two centuries, the ice cream flavor has been offered at a number of 21st-century oyster festivals.

== History ==
The only historical source for oyster ice cream is found in Mary Randolph's cookbook, The Virginia House-Wife, published in 1824. The recipe is as follows:

OYSTER CREAM Make a rich soup, (see directions for oyster soup,) strain it from the oysters, and freeze it.

OYSTER SOUP Wash and drain two quarts of oysters, put them on with three quarts of water, three onions chopped up, two or three slices of lean ham, pepper and salt; boil it till reduced one-half, strain it through a sieve, return the liquid into the pot, put in one quart of fresh oysters, boil it till they are sufficiently done, and thicken the soup with four spoonsful of flour, two gills of rich cream, and the yelks of six new laid eggs beaten well; boil it a few minutes after the thickening is put in. Take care that it does not curdle, and that the flour is not in lumps; serve it up with the last oysters that were put in. If the flavour of thyme be agreeable, you may put in a little, but take care that it does not boil in it long enough to discolour the soup.

Contrary to various news reports in the 21st century, oyster ice cream was not served at the First Thanksgiving, nor was it a favorite of George Washington's, nor served in the White House by Dolley Madison, nor mentioned by Mark Twain in his novel The Adventures of Tom Sawyer. However, President James Madison's wife, first lady Dolley Madison, is reported to have served several different flavors of ice cream, both sweet and savory, including: asparagus, parmesan and oyster.

== 21st century ==
According to chef and restaurateur José Andrés, oyster ice cream is made by "gently heating oysters and cream", before freezing the product. Food historian Robert Brantley describes the oyster ice cream of the 1800s as “[e]ssentially...frozen oyster chowder. They served it unsweetened." Oyster ice cream has a savory flavor as opposed to a sweet one. Lorraine Eaton of The Virginian-Pilot wrote that one of her colleagues at work "had nearly thrown up" after tasting Eaton's homemade oyster ice cream; others had favorable criticism for the ice cream flavor.

Two varieties of oyster ice cream were featured at the Colchester Oyster Festival in Colchester, Essex, in September 2012. "Oyster-and-ginger" ice cream was served at the 23rd Oyster Festival in Arcata Main Street in June 2013.

== See also ==
- List of ice cream flavors
