= Blue moon (ice cream) =

Ice cream flavor from the American Midwest

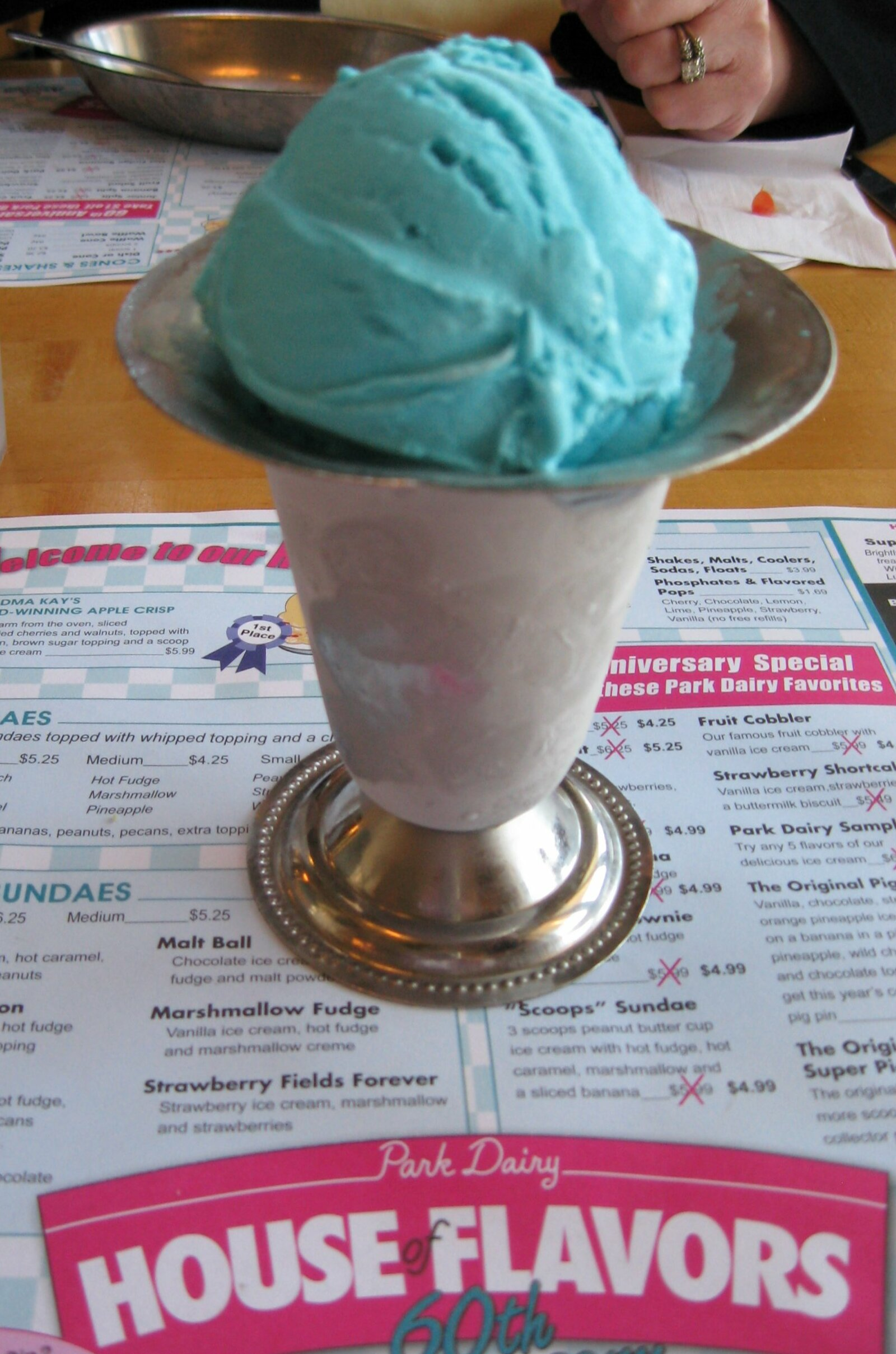
- A cup of blue moon ice cream at the House of Flavors ice cream parlor in Ludington, Michigan (2009)
- Type: Ice cream
- Region or state: Midwestern United States

Blue moon is an ice cream flavor with bright blue coloring, available in the Upper Midwest of the United States. Multiple cities in the region claim to be the originator, with the popular theories including Plainwell, Michigan, Ludington, Michigan, and Erie, Pennsylvania. Different companies produce different variations of the flavor. The most widely spread variant was invented by Bill Sidon with Petran Products in the 1950s in Milwaukee, Wisconsin. The Chicago Tribune described the ice cream as "Smurf-blue, marshmallow-sweet". Blue moon ice cream is one of the flavors that make up Superman ice cream in certain states.

Blue moon is found mainly in the Midwest— eastern/ southern Wisconsin and western Michigan in particular.

== Characteristics ==
There are several varieties of blue moon varying in both color and flavor. Most commonly being described as fruity, almondy, cotton candy like or sometimes all these flavors at once. Many aficionados of each variety of blue moon claim that their variety is the "real one", the "original", etc.

Some dairies that make blue moon keep their ingredients a secret, adding to the mystique. Varieties that have distinct berry or vanilla flavor notes are sometimes theorized to have been originally flavored with castoreum.

== Similar international flavors ==
A similar flavor has been sold in both Italy and Malta under the name puffo, which is Italian for 'Smurf', as well as in Germany under the names Schlumpf and Engelblau, which translate to 'Smurf' and 'angel blue', respectively. In Northern Cyprus, it is known as Mavi Melek, which translates to 'Blue Angel'.

In the Netherlands and Belgium, this flavor of ice cream is known as smurfenijs ('Smurf Ice'). In France, it is called schtroumpf and in Spain pitufo (both meaning 'Smurf').

== See also ==
- Moon mist
