= Mint chocolate chip =

Ice cream flavor

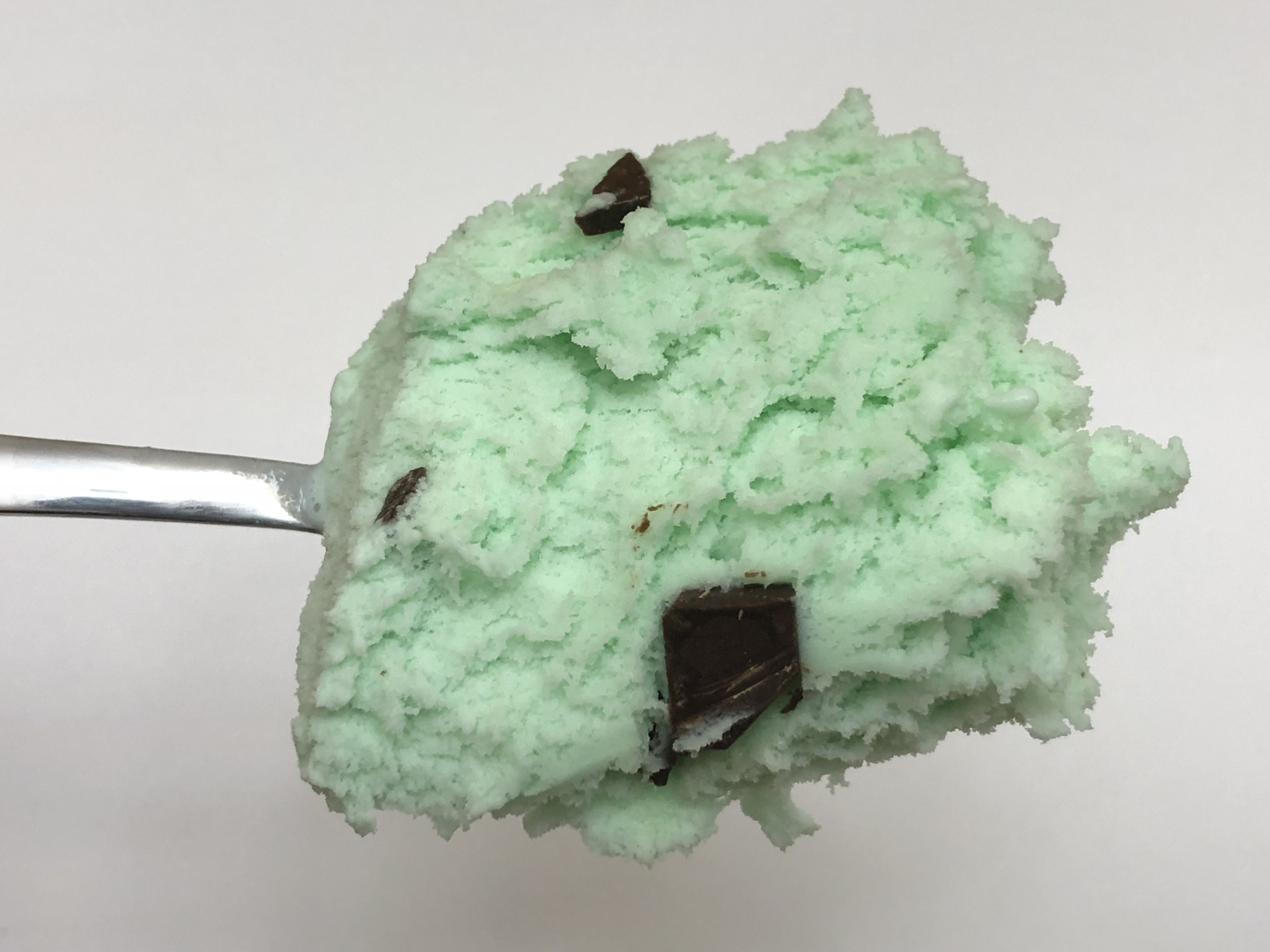
- Mint chocolate chip ice cream
- Type: Ice cream
- Course: Dessert
- Main ingredients: Mint ice cream, chocolate chips, green food coloring (optional)

Mint chocolate chip or mint choc chip is an ice cream flavor composed of mint ice cream with small chocolate chips. In some cases the liqueur crème de menthe is used to provide the mint flavor, but in most cases peppermint or spearmint flavoring is used. Green food coloring is often added.

According to the International Dairy Foods Association (IDFA), mint chocolate chip was the seventh-most popular ice cream in 2017. Later, in a May 2024 survey by IDFA, mint chocolate chip was ranked as America's seventh-most popular ice cream flavor.

The flavor is used in other foods such as cookies, meringues, and milkshakes. Ice cream manufacturer Baskin-Robbins has created a hard candy named "mint chocolate chip" that tastes similar to their ice cream, which is one of their "permanent flavors".

In Korea, the flavor is often referred to as mint choco, and is a widespread food trend with many variations including mint chocolate snacks, drinks, and a fried chicken flavoring.

== History ==
The use of mint to soften the bitterness of chocolate has been around for a long time. With the practice of mixing mint and chocolate starting in the 16th century England when both began arriving through imports.

Baskin-Robbins cites Mint Chocolate Chip as one of the original 31 flavors when they began operations in 1945 even though there were no mint chocolate chip in their original list but mint chocolate and chocolate chip. Howard Johnson's restaurants were serving a "chocolate mint chip" flavor by the early 1950s, which would become a common flavor into the 1960s and 70s. Previously, Howard Johnson's was responsible for inventing chocolate chip ice cream under George R. Pitman.

In 1973, British culinary student Marilyn Ricketts entered a dessert competition for the wedding of Princess Anne and won with her "Mint Royale" Mint Chocolate Chip ice cream. Ricketts is also credited with the invention of the mint chocolate chip.

The domestic terrorist Timothy McVeigh's last meal before he was executed in the federal penitentiary in Terre Haute, Indiana for the 1995 Oklahoma City bombing was two pints of mint chocolate chip ice cream.

== See also ==
- List of ice cream flavors
- Mint chocolate
