= Tramontana (ice cream) =

Argentine dessert and ice cream flavor

- Place of origin: Argentina
- Region or state: Mar del Plata
- Created by: Juan Guarracino
- Serving temperature: Cold
- Main ingredients: Dark chocolate, white chocolate, dulce de leche, cookies

Tramontana is an Argentine dessert and ice cream flavor.

Juan Guarracino, founder of Freddo ice cream franchise, created and named the flavor in honor to his friend Giuseppe Tramontano, an Italian-born man who moved to Argentina with his wife after World War II. In the 1970s, the Tramontana family had founded an ice cream parlor named Tramontana in a seaside resort town. It was originally made with white chocolate dipped in dark chocolate, and it would later include dulce de leche and coated cookies. In time, Giuseppe began making his own version that was similar to but not exactly the same as Guarracino's creation. Today, it is regarded in Argentina as a classic flavor.

== See also ==
- List of ice cream flavors
