= Butter pecan =

Flavor of ice cream, cakes, and cookies

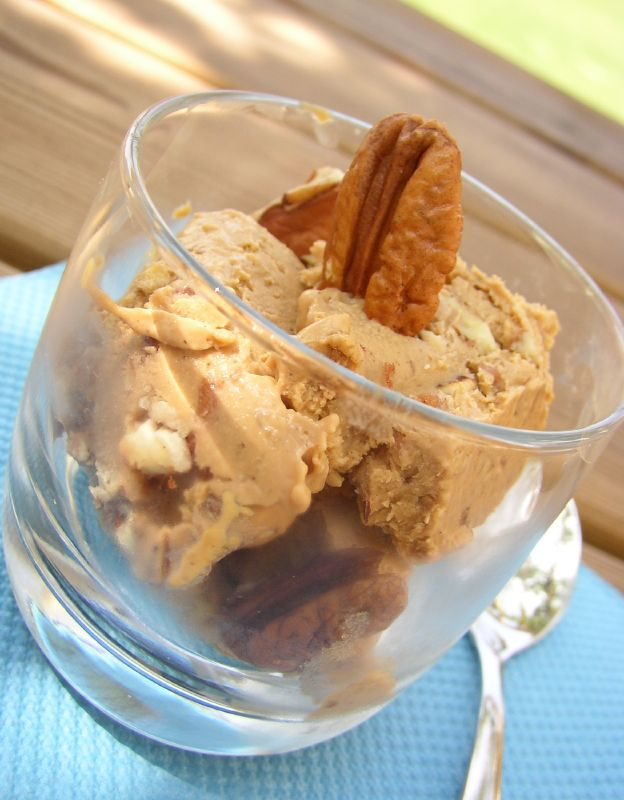
- Butter pecan caramel ice cream
- Place of origin: United States
- Main ingredients: pecans, butter, and vanilla

Butter pecan is a flavor, prominent especially in the southern United States, in ice cream, cakes, and cookies. The flavor is an element of soul food, the cuisine of Black Americans.

Roasted pecans, butter, and vanilla flavor are used in butter pecan baked goods. Butter pecan ice cream is smooth vanilla ice cream with a slight buttery flavor, with pecans added. It is manufactured by many major ice cream brands. A variant of the recipe is butter almond, which replaces the pecans with almonds.

Butter pecan is a popular flavor of ice cream produced by many companies and is also one of the thirty-one flavors of Baskin Robbins.

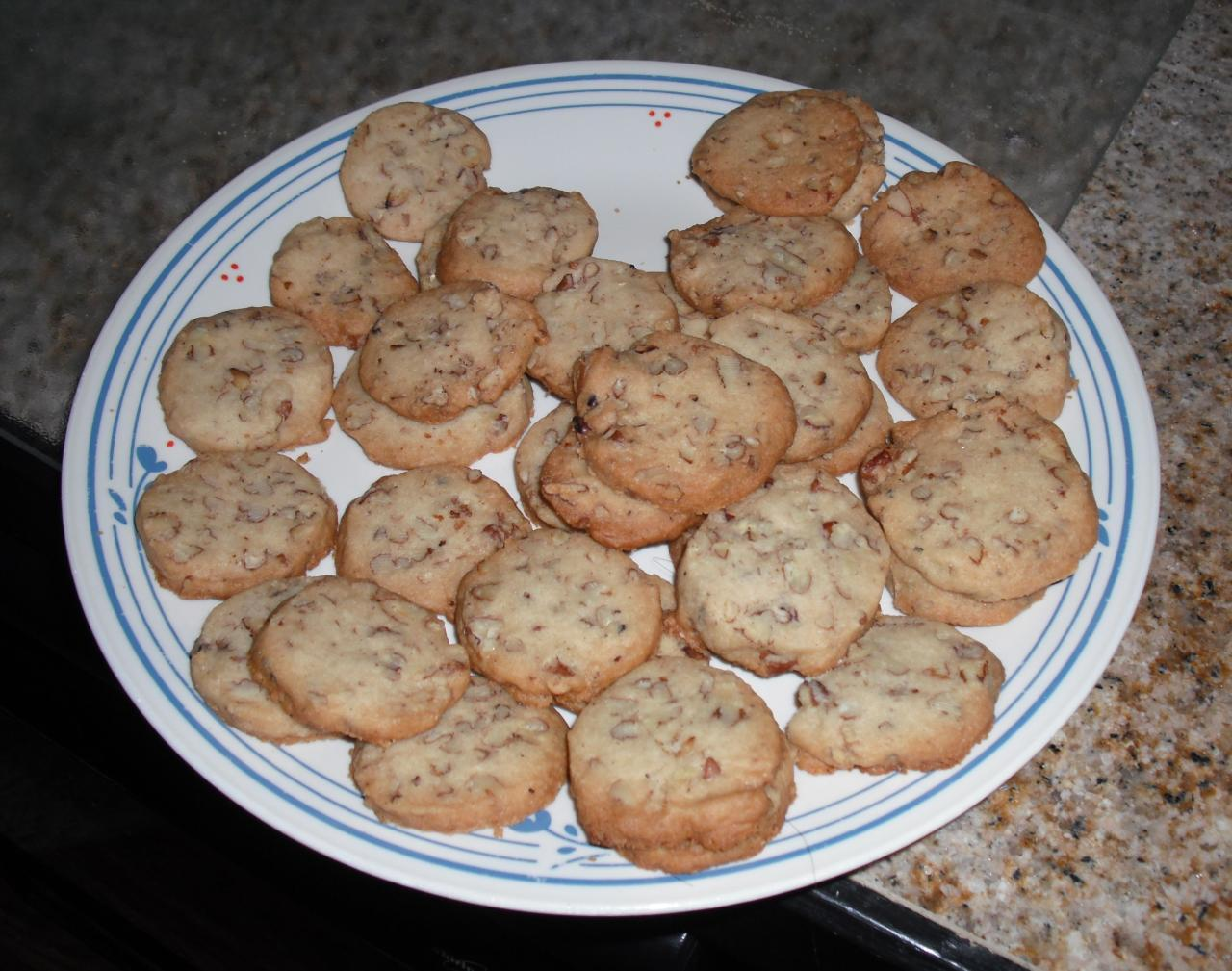
Butter pecan cookies

== See also ==
- List of cookies
- List of ice cream flavors
