= Magdalena Dobromila Rettigová =

Czech cookery writer

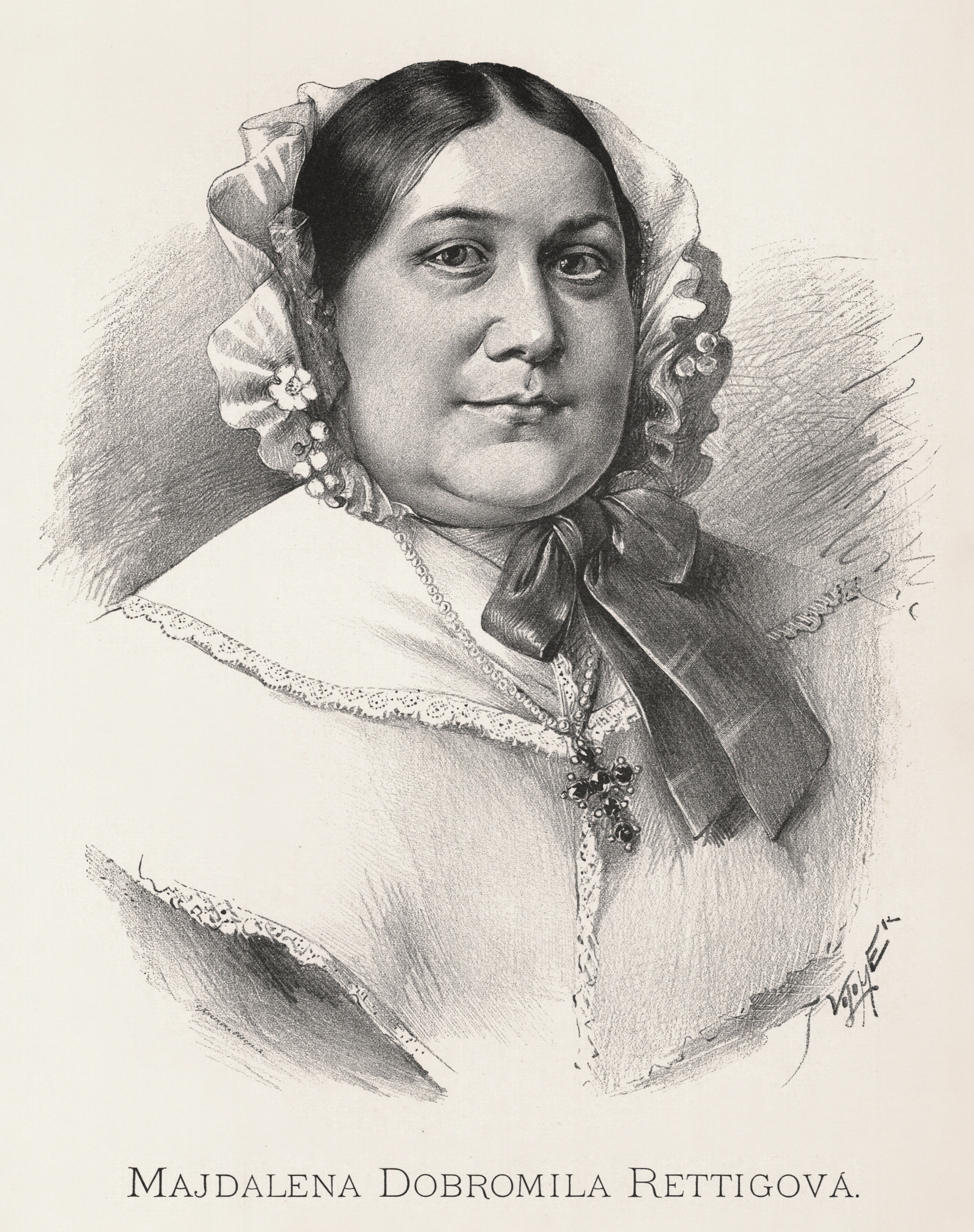
Portrait of Magdalena Dobromila Rettigová by Jan Vilímek

Magdalena Dobromila Rettigová (31 January 1785 – 5 August 1845) was a Czech writer known for her famous cookery book.

== Biography ==
Rettigová, née Artmann, was born in Všeradice, into a German-speaking family. Her childhood was not happy and her father died in 1792. In 1808 she married Jan Alois Sudiprav Rettig, a Czech patriot from a half-German-speaking family. Under his influence she learned to speak and write correctly in Czech and also started to use her middle name Dobromila. Rettigová was active in the Czech National Revival movement, also helped to found an educational institute for girls (her main advice for the girls was to keep their husband happy no matter what). Of her 11 children only three survived into adult age. She died, aged 60, in Litomyšl.

Her early literary works were mostly syrupy and sentimental texts. In 1826 Rettigová published her legendary (in Czech circles) recipe book "A Household Cookery Book or A Treatise on Meat and Fasting Dishes for Bohemian and Moravian Lasses". This book became a 19th-century bestseller and for a long time remained the only cookery book written in Czech. Rettigová continued to improve the book with culinary experiments.

Most of the recipes in her cookbook were written without access to foreign spices, and thus require adaptation to fit with modern lifestyle. The book is still being reprinted and a copy can be found in libraries of many Czech households.
