= Kawartha Dairy Company =

Canadian dairy company

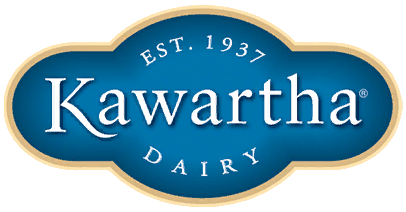

Kawartha Dairy Company is a Canadian family owned and operated dairy based in Bobcaygeon, Ontario in the City of Kawartha Lakes. The company was founded in 1937 and it remains family owned. Kawartha Dairy produces a line of milk and cream products, which are sold both wholesale and in its own retail stores. The company also operates ten of its own retail stores in Ontario.

== History ==
In 1937, Jack and Ila Crowe bought a small dairy in Bobcaygeon after Jack enjoyed his experience working at the now-defunct Oshawa Dairy. Originally established as Hart Dairy in 1908 after the founder and renamed as Oshawa Dairy to reflect the place of business. Oshawa Dairy was acquired by Ideal Dairy in 1967 and continued to 1970 when Ideal Dairy was sold to Beatrice Foods) and began producing and selling milk products. They initially used ice from the nearby Pigeon Lake to keep their products in cold storage. Kawartha Dairy increased the size of their operation in 1942 by buying the other dairies such as Murphy Brothers Meadowbrook Dairy (began under Roy and Clayton Murphy's father Gerald Murphy in 1900 and closed after tuberculosis outbreak resulted in destroying the farm's entire herd) in the town. They stored their products in 80 lbs steel containers and delivered them to the surrounding area by wagon or boat in the summer and by sleigh in the winter. In the mid-1950s Crowe attended courses at the University of Guelph, where he learned how to make ice cream, which would soon be added to Kawartha Dairy's line of products and become one of their signature items. In the early 1960s, the company expanded to Minden where it opened a retail store.

In 2008, there were five Kawartha Dairy retail stores in central Ontario. In 2010 the company received approximately $620,000 in funding from the Province of Ontario's Rural Economic Development Program to facilitate the expansion and updating of their plant in Bobcaygeon, including the creation of ten new jobs and updated production systems. Additional provincial funding of $311,200 was also secured in August 2017 to help with the expansion of their refrigeration and storage facilities, the company's largest such expansion in its 70-year history.

By 2012, the company was operating eight retail stores in Ontario in addition to its wholesale business. 2016 saw the opening of a ninth store in Orillia, and by May 2018, a tenth store was opened in Newmarket. The company employs 145 staff, in addition to around 100 extra employees when demand increases in the summer.

In 2013, Kawartha Dairy launched an expansion into urban grocery stores throughout Ontario. The company capitalized on its association with cottage country by including images of rural Ontario landscapes on its packaging. In 2015, the redesign was awarded Best in Show at the PAC Global Leadership Awards.

In 2017, Kawartha celebrated its 80th anniversary. That same year, the company received $311,200 from the Eastern Ontario Development Fund to help on its $7.5-million expansion of the company's operations and its product lines.

== Locations ==
There are nineteen retail stores offering ice cream and other dairy products:

- Bancroft, Ontario
- Barrie, Ontario
- Bobcaygeon, Ontario
- Britannia Beach, British Columbla
- Burlington, Ontario
- Cobourg, Ontario
- Huntsville, Ontario
- Kelowna, British Columbia
- Lindsay, Ontario
- Minden, Ontario
- Newmarket, Ontario
- Orillia, Ontario
- Ottawa, Ontario
- Orleans, Ontario
- Peterborough, Ontario
- Southampton, Ontario
- Toronto, Ontario
- Uxbridge, Ontario
- Victoria, British Columbia

== Products ==
Some of Kawartha Dairy's most popular products include its ice cream, chocolate milk, and eggnog, which are sold in the company's own retail stores and distributed in third-party retailers across Ontario. The company makes a point of using fresh Ontario milk and cream exclusively in its ice cream and they source the majority of their milk from the Bobcaygeon area. In February 2018, Kawartha Dairy collaborated with Ontario brewer Muskoka of Bracebridge on a limited-edition beer based on the former's Salty Caramel Truffle ice cream flavour, which was brewed in a bock style and contained caramel and milk chocolate flavours. In the summer of 2018, the company began offering edible candy spoons as a way to reduce waste and benefit the environment.
