= Banana split =

Ice cream dish served with banana

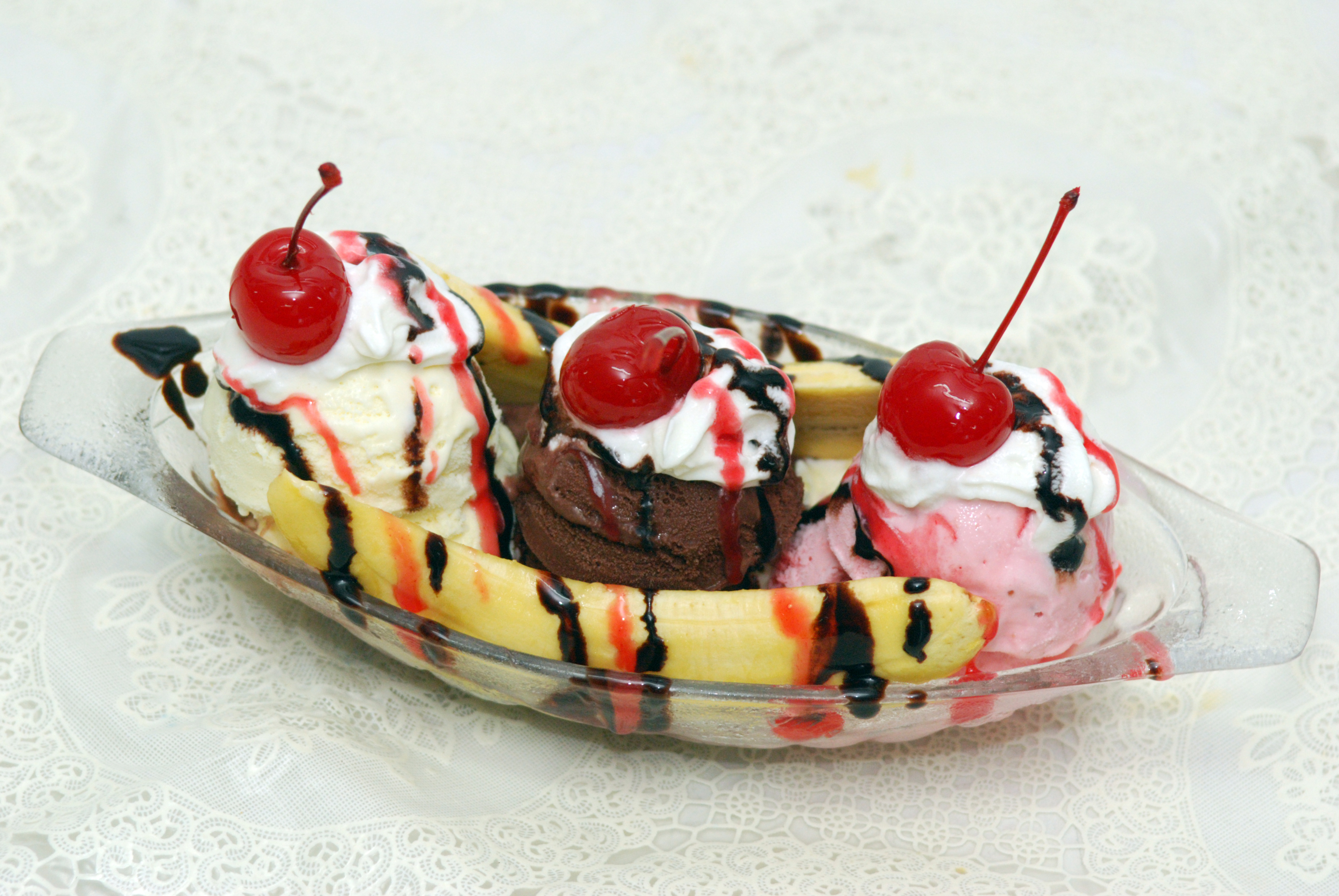
- Banana split with three flavors of ice cream
- Course: Dessert
- Place of origin: United States
- Region or state: Latrobe, PA
- Serving temperature: Cold
- Main ingredients: Vanilla, chocolate, and strawberry ice cream, bananas
- Ingredients generally used: Whipped cream, maraschino cherry
- Variations: Caramel topping, strawberry topping, pineapple topping, chocolate syrup, nuts

A banana split is an American ice cream-based dessert consisting of a peeled banana cut in half lengthwise, and served with ice cream and sauce between the two pieces. There are many variations, but the classic banana split is made with three scoops of ice cream (one each of vanilla, chocolate, and strawberry). A sauce or sauces (chocolate, strawberry, and pineapple are traditional) are drizzled onto the ice cream, which is topped with whipped cream and maraschino cherries. Crushed nuts (generally peanuts or walnuts) are optional.

== Description ==
The original banana split was made with three scoops of different flavored ice creams, topped with fruits, and served over a banana that was split vertically down the middle. The original recipe used strawberries, raspberries and crushed pineapple with marshmallow syrup, chopped nuts, and pitted black cherries. The banana split is traditionally served in an elongated glass dish called a "boat".

Strickler's marshmallow sauce is no longer used as a topping. The traditional toppings used in today's banana split include pineapple, strawberry and chocolate sauce, whipped cream, nuts, and cherries. Caramel sauce, on the other hand, is a non-traditional topping used in later variations of the classic banana split.

Variations on the classic may use grilled bananas, experiment with different flavors of ice cream such as coconut or coffee, or sauces like salted caramel and warm butterscotch.

== History ==
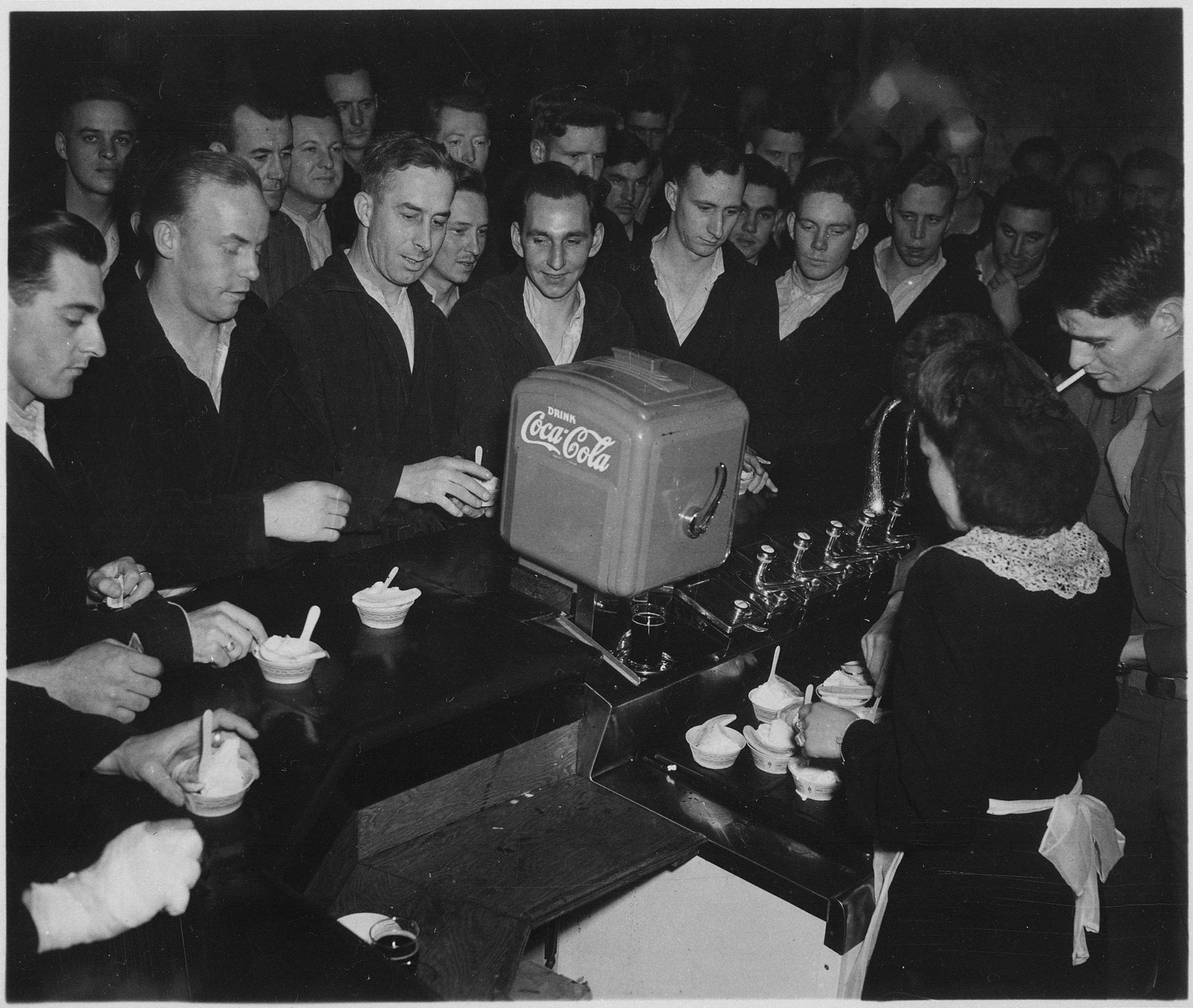
Banana splits and ice cream sundaes served at a soda fountain at the 1st U.S. General Hospital in Paris during World War II

Cold beverages and ice cream were a novelty in the mid-1800s when soda fountains began selling ice cream concoctions. A popular recipe published in 1907 called for a lengthwise split banana, two scoops of ice cream at each end, whipped cream in the middle with a maraschino cherry on top, then one end covered with chopped mixed nuts and the other with chopped mixed fruits. The Spatula Soda Water Guide published in 1919 contained recipes for 25 banana split varieties.

The origin of the banana split is disputed, but most historians believe it was created in 1904 by David "Doc" Strickler, a 23-year-old University of Pittsburgh pharmacy student who was working as a soda jerk at Tassell Pharmacy in Latrobe, Pennsylvania. Strickler was inspired by the fruit laden sundaes he saw while vacationing in Atlantic City in the summer of 1904, and aspired to create something similar when he returned to Latrobe using the banana, which in those days was shipped to Pennsylvania by way of New Orleans. The sundae he concocted originally cost 10 cents ($3.58 in 2026), twice the price of other sundaes, and caught on with students of nearby Saint Vincent College. News of a new variety of sundae quickly spread by word-of-mouth and through correspondence, soon progressing far beyond Latrobe. Strickler went on to buy the pharmacy, naming it Strickler's Pharmacy, while keeping his office on a top floor.

Wilmington, Ohio, also claims an early connection dating to 1907 when Ernest "Doc" Hazard created a dessert in hopes of attracting students from Wilmington College to his shop during the slow days of winter. The dessert he came up with was the banana split: three scoops of ice cream served between the two halves of a split banana, topped with chocolate, strawberry and pineapple sauces, whipped cream, maraschino cherries and nuts.

However, most historians believe the evidence for Strickler's 1904 debut is more convincing, and, in 2004, the National Ice Cream Retailers Association (NICRA) certified the city of Latrobe, Pennsylvania, as the birthplace of the banana split. Both Latrobe and Wilmington hold an annual festival in honor of the dessert. In 2013, the Pennsylvania Historical and Museum Commission approved a state historical marker for the banana split, which was installed at the site of the former Stricker's Pharmacy in Latrobe.

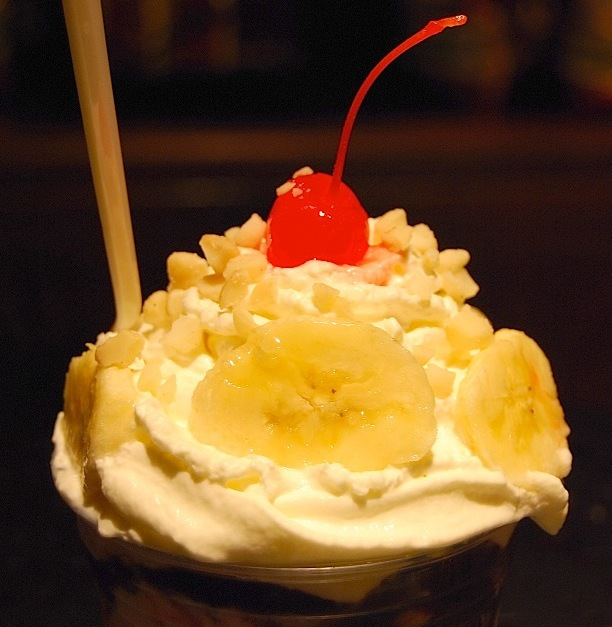
Banana royale shown topped with banana slices

Latrobe and Wilmington are not the only towns to claim the distinction of inventing the banana split. In Boston it is said the dessert was created at the Butler Department Store by the head soda jerk who, in 1905, served a banana split with two scoops of vanilla ice cream, topped with peaches, walnuts and pistachios. Davenport, Iowa, claims it was invented by a local Davenport confectioner in 1906, and similar claims have been made by Columbus, Ohio, where the banana split is said to have been created by Letty Lally when a customer at Foeller's Drug Store asked for "something different." (Food writer Mike Turback considers Lally's creation the first banana royale, a sundae made with banana slices.) The lack of evidence presents an obstacle to proving any of these claims.

Walgreens is credited with spreading the popularity of the banana split. The early drug stores operated by Charles Rudolph Walgreen in the Chicago area adopted the banana split as a signature dessert. Fountains in the stores proved to be a draw, attracting customers who might otherwise have been just as satisfied having their prescriptions filled at some other drug store in the neighborhood.

== Banana split pie ==
The banana split pie was created by Janet Winquest, a 16-year-old resident of Holdrege, Nebraska. In 1952, she won a $3,000 prize in Pillsbury's Grand National Recipe and Baking Contest for the recipe.

== See also ==
- List of banana dishes
- Sundae
