= Neapolitan ice cream =

Ice cream composed of vanilla, chocolate, and strawberry flavors

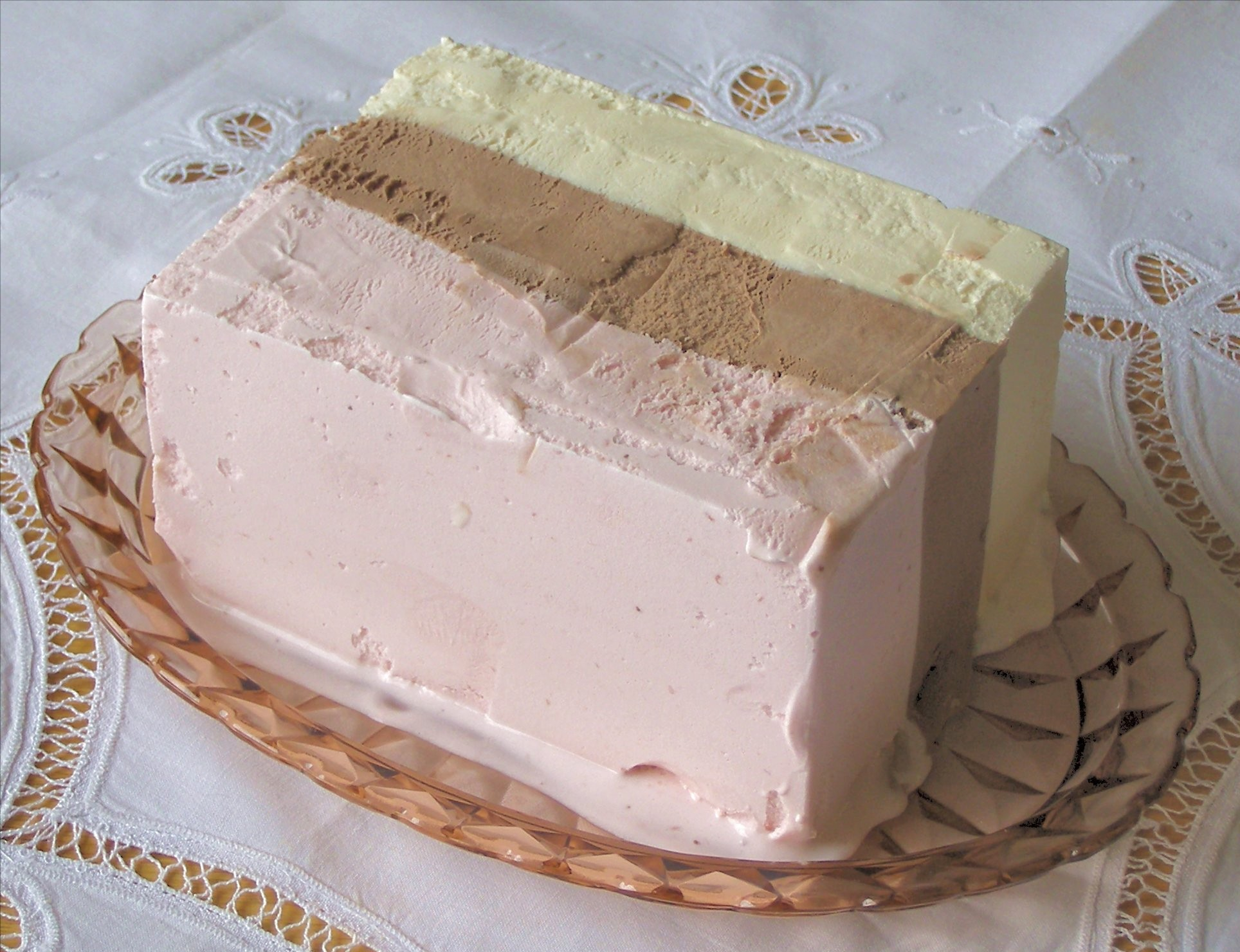
- A block of Neapolitan ice cream
- Place of origin: Prussia
- Main ingredients: Vanilla, chocolate, strawberry ice cream
- Variations: Historically, colors were of the Italian flag: green (pistachio or almond), white (vanilla), and red (cherry, actually pink).

Neapolitan ice cream, also sometimes referred to as Harlequin ice cream, is an ice cream composed of three flavors (typically vanilla, chocolate, and strawberry) arranged side by side. Although Neapolitan is associated with Naples in Italy, it was first recorded in Prussia in 1839.

== History ==
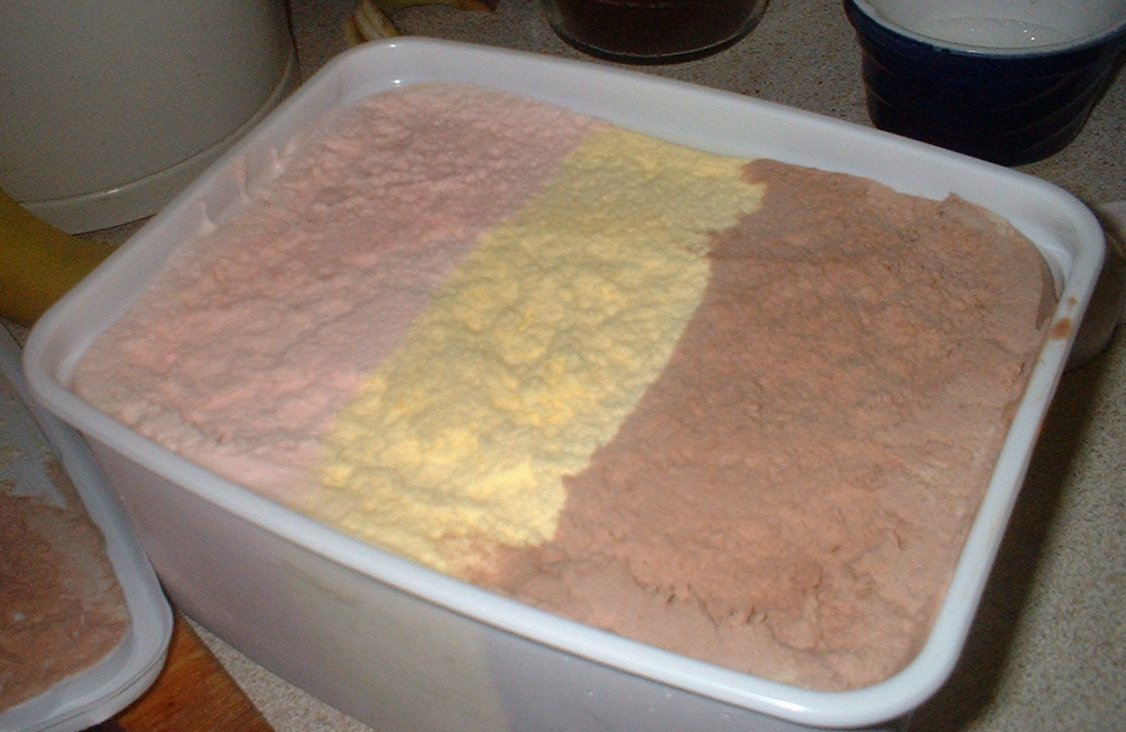
Tub of Neapolitan ice cream from the United Kingdom

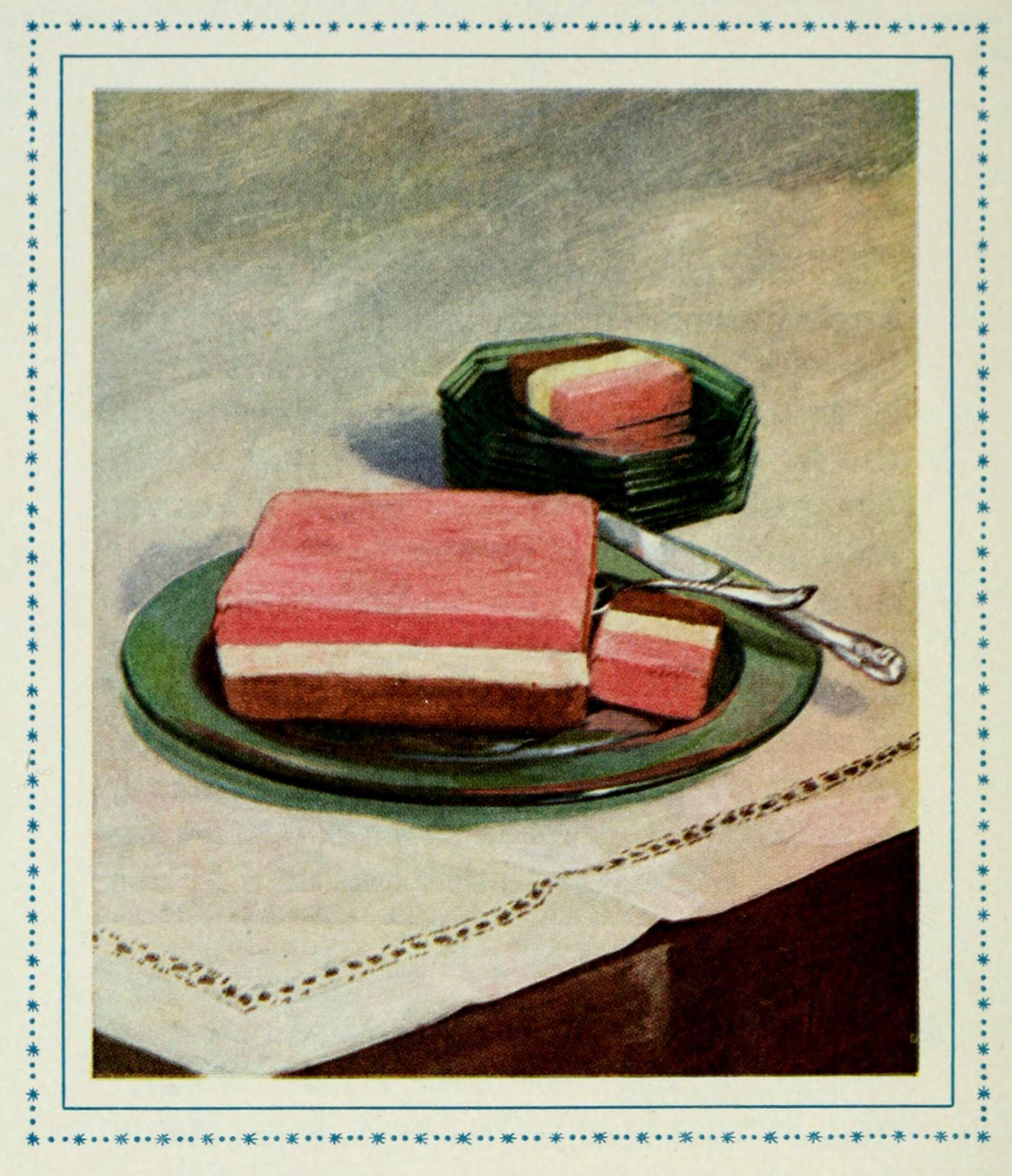
1927 illustration of homemade Neapolitan icecream

Neapolitan ice cream was the first ice cream recipe to combine three flavors. As of 2026, the origins of the recipe are unclear.

In 1839, head chef of the royal Prussian household Louis Ferdinand Jungius published a layered fruit-flavored ice cream recipe named after the Bad Muskau nobleman Fürst Pückler, suggesting strawberries, raspberries, Reine Claude greengages, red and black cherries, and apricots, adding that with liqueurs and maraschino it could be incorporated with caramel, rose liqueur and coffee layers In 1862, he suggested apricots, quinces, raspberries and strawberries. In 1903, an illustration shows three layers colored top to bottom white, red and brown, as well as the Kaffee König original recipe in Bad Muskau with respectively coco with maraschino, strawberries and chocolate flavors, all also containing macaroon pieces with maraschino, in 1920.

Jenifer Harvey Lang claims Neapolitan ice cream makers were famous in Paris at the start of the 19th century. According to John F. Mariani, confectioners' shops were often run by Italians during the 18th century, leading to people associating them with Italians and calling ice cream "Italian ice creams" or "Neapolitan ice creams". Stuart Berg Flexner claimed it was first discussed in the 1870s.

The English-language name of Neapolitan arose in the late 19th century due to confusion about its origin given Italy's reputation for ice cream or because its colors—originally green (pistachio), white (vanilla) and red (cherry)—matched those of the Italian flag. Early recipes featured a variety of flavors, but the combination of chocolate, vanilla, and strawberry became the standard, likely because these were the most popular flavors in the United States at the time of its introduction.

19th century descriptions call for a mold known as a "Neapolitan box" or "Neapolitan ice box" to be used for the recipe. It would be filled with three to four or four to five different kinds of ice cream, left to set in an ice house, then cut into individual slices for serving. Lizzie Heritage also calls for the use of a "Neapolitan ice spoon", featuring an ice bowl for filling the mold and a handle for leveling the ice cream in the mold.

== Cake ==
In Australia, Neapolitan cake or marble cake is made with the same three colours of Neapolitan ice cream swirled through in a marble pattern, usually topped with pink icing.

== See also ==
- List of ice cream flavors
- Fab (brand)
- Spumoni

== Sources ==
- Olver, Lynne (1999). "Food Timeline – history notes: ice cream & ice". The Food Timeline.
