= Cookies and cream =

Ice cream variety flavored with chocolate sandwich cookies

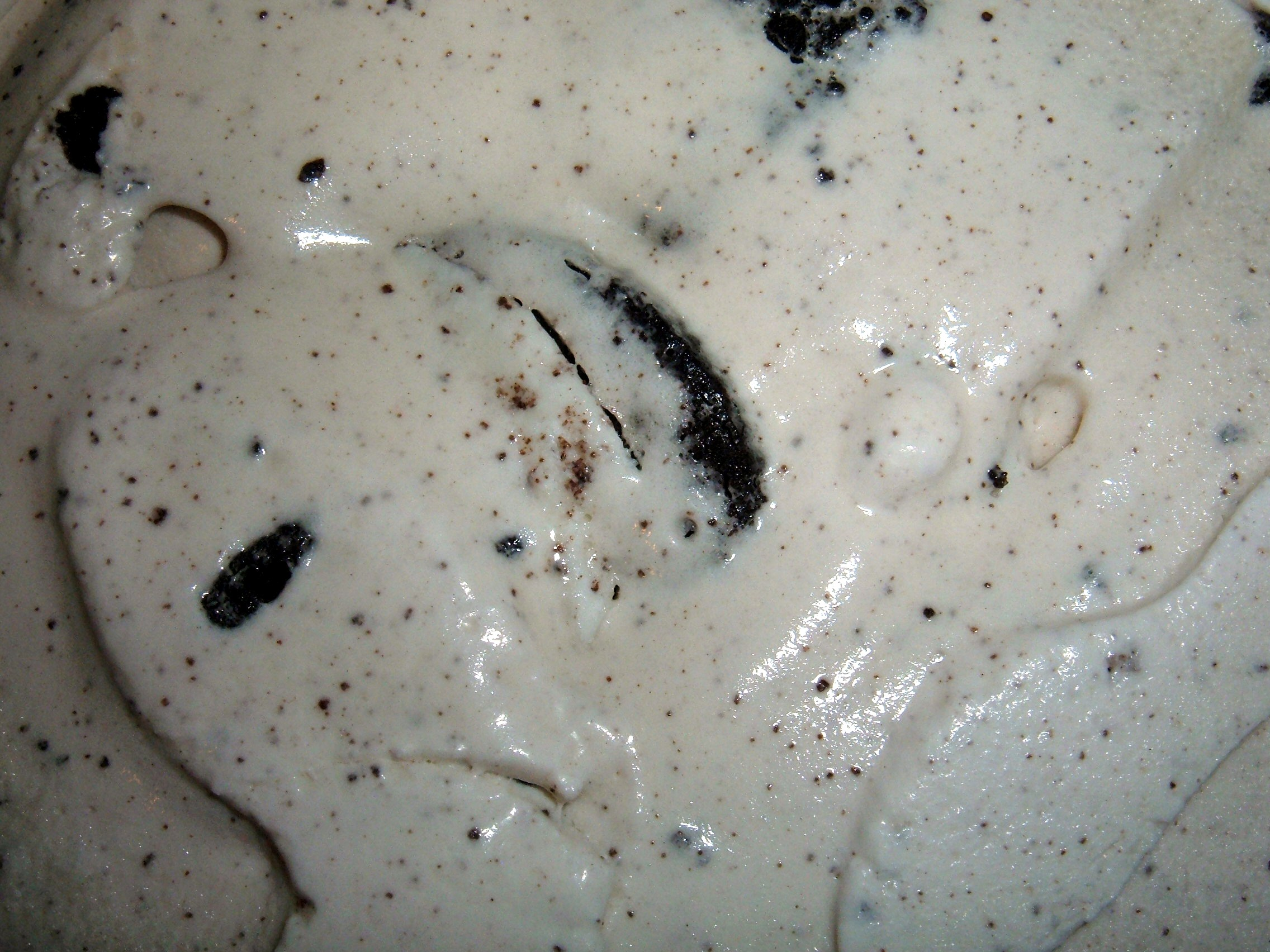
- Cookies and cream ice cream
- Alternative names: Cookies 'n cream, cookies 'n creme, cookie cream
- Type: Ice cream, milkshake, yogurt, cheesecake
- Place of origin: United States
- Main ingredients: Ice cream (usually vanilla), chocolate cookies (usually sandwich cookies or similar)

Cookies and cream (or cookies 'n cream) is a variety of ice cream, milkshake, and other desserts, including chocolate sandwich cookies, with the most popular version containing hand or pre-crumbled cookies from Nabisco's Oreo brand under a licensing agreement, or else, containing crumbles of a similar cookie of a different brand or private label. Cookies and cream ice cream generally mixes crumbled chocolate sandwich cookies into vanilla ice cream. However, variations exist which instead use chocolate, coffee or mint ice cream.

== History ==
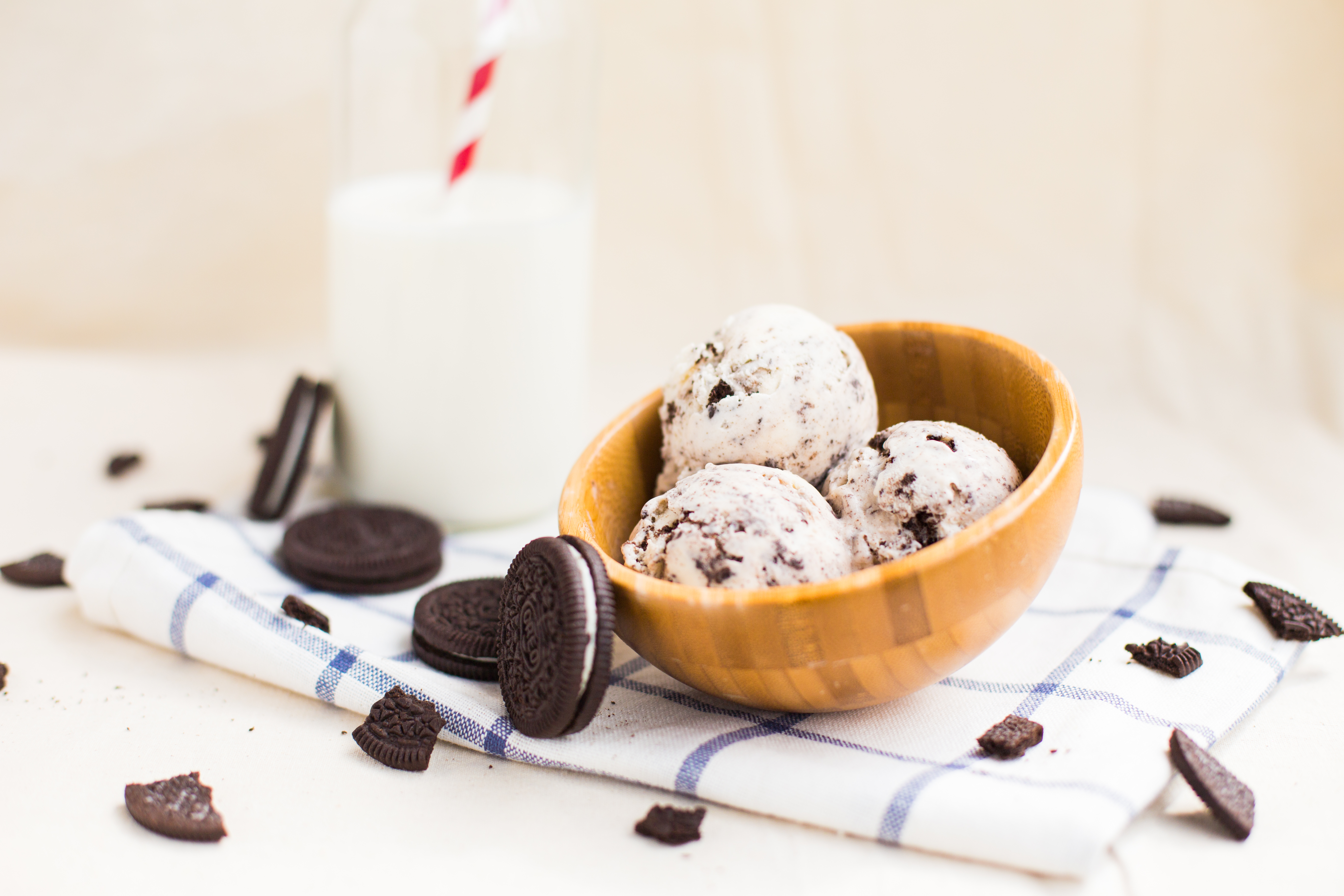
Cookies and Cream Ice Cream

There are competing claims as to who first invented and marketed cookies and cream ice cream.

- Malcolm Stogo, an ice cream consultant, claimed to have created the flavor in 1976, 1977 or 1978.
- South Dakota State University claims the flavor was invented at the university's dairy plant in 1979 by plant manager Shirley Seas and students Joe Leedom and Joe Van Treeck.
- In a 2005 press release, Blue Bell Creameries claimed they were the first company to mass-produce the flavor, in 1980. In 2006, The New York Times reported that Blue Bell made "no claim to have invented it but certainly pioneered the flavor." However, as of 2020, the company's website proclaimed, "We were first to create this innovative flavor." Blue Bell Creameries applied to register the trademark "Cookies 'n Cream" in 1981.
- John Harrison, the official taster for Dreyer's/Edy's Ice Cream, claims he invented it first for the company in 1982.

In 1983, cookies and cream became one of the top five best-selling flavors of ice cream.

== See also ==
- Hershey's Cookies 'n' Creme
