= Café liégeois =

Cold dessert of French origin

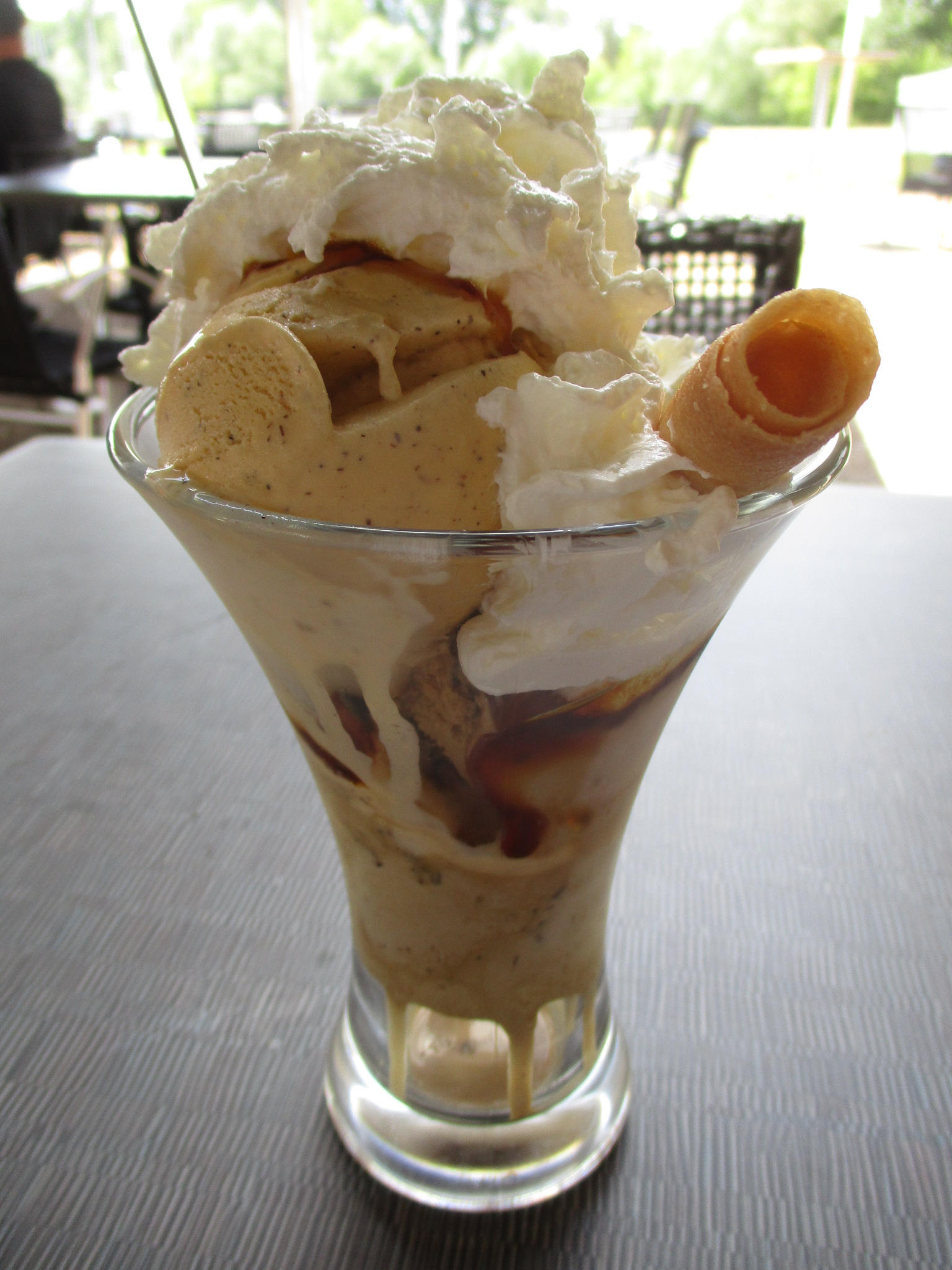
- Alternative names: Café viennois
- Course: Dessert
- Place of origin: France
- Main ingredients: Coffee, coffee ice cream, Chantilly cream
- Variations: Chocolat liégeois, with chocolate ice cream

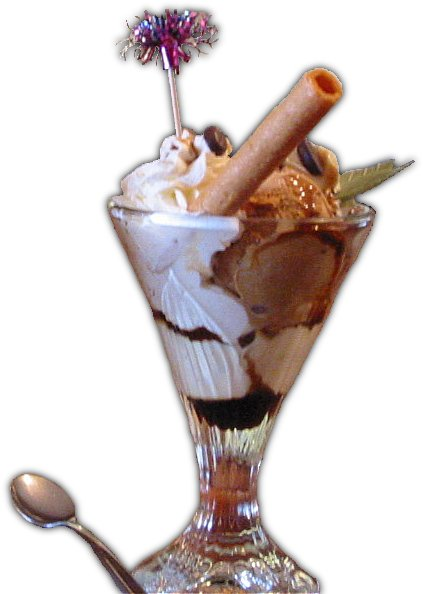
Café Liégeois in Italy

Café liégeois is a French cold dessert made from lightly sweetened coffee, coffee-flavoured ice cream and Chantilly cream.

Refrigerate a large glass filled with the required amount of sweetened coffee, and add the ice cream and Chantilly just prior to serving. Often crushed roasted coffee beans are put on top of the Chantilly as decoration.

== History ==
Contrary to its name, the café liégeois dessert did not originate in or around Liège, Belgium. It was originally known in France as a café viennois (French for 'Viennese coffee'). At the outbreak of World War I in August 1914, Belgium refused a German ultimatum demanding free passage through its territory to attack France. German forces invaded on August 4, but the city of Liège mounted a fierce 12-day resistance, delaying the German advance and aiding French preparations. In recognition, France awarded Liège the Légion d'honneur. Amid strong anti-German sentiment in Paris, the popular café viennois—named after Vienna, capital of Austria-Hungary, Germany’s ally—was renamed café liégeois in tribute to the Belgian city’s heroism.

Café liégeois is a French dessert made of sweetened iced coffee or coffee ice cream topped with whipped cream (crème Chantilly). It evolved from 19th-century recipes and was first named Café liégeois in the Larousse Gastronomique (1938). It is often confused with café viennois, a hot coffee with whipped cream.

Auguste Escoffier’s Guide Culinaire (1907) features a recipe for iced coffee, where freshly brewed coffee is combined with sugar, milk, and cream, then churned in an ice cream maker. This method for iced coffee appeared in numerous culinary works, but the term café viennois or café liégeois was not yet used. In 1936, Madame A. Moerman's Livre pratique de cuisine introduced a recipe for café viennois, which involved making a coffee-flavored custard and serving it with whipped cream. In 1938, the Larousse Gastronomique first referenced café liégeois, noting that iced coffee, when topped with whipped cream, became café liégeois. This marked the first official mention of the term, 20 years after World War I. By the 1960 edition of Nouveau Larousse gastronomique, the recipe for iced coffee remained the same, confirming that the addition of whipped cream defined café liégeois.

== See also ==
- List of coffee dishes
