= List of coffee dishes =

This is a list of coffee dishes, which includes foods that use coffee as a primary ingredient, and for which coffee is an essential ingredient. Coffee beverages are omitted from this list.

== Coffee dishes ==
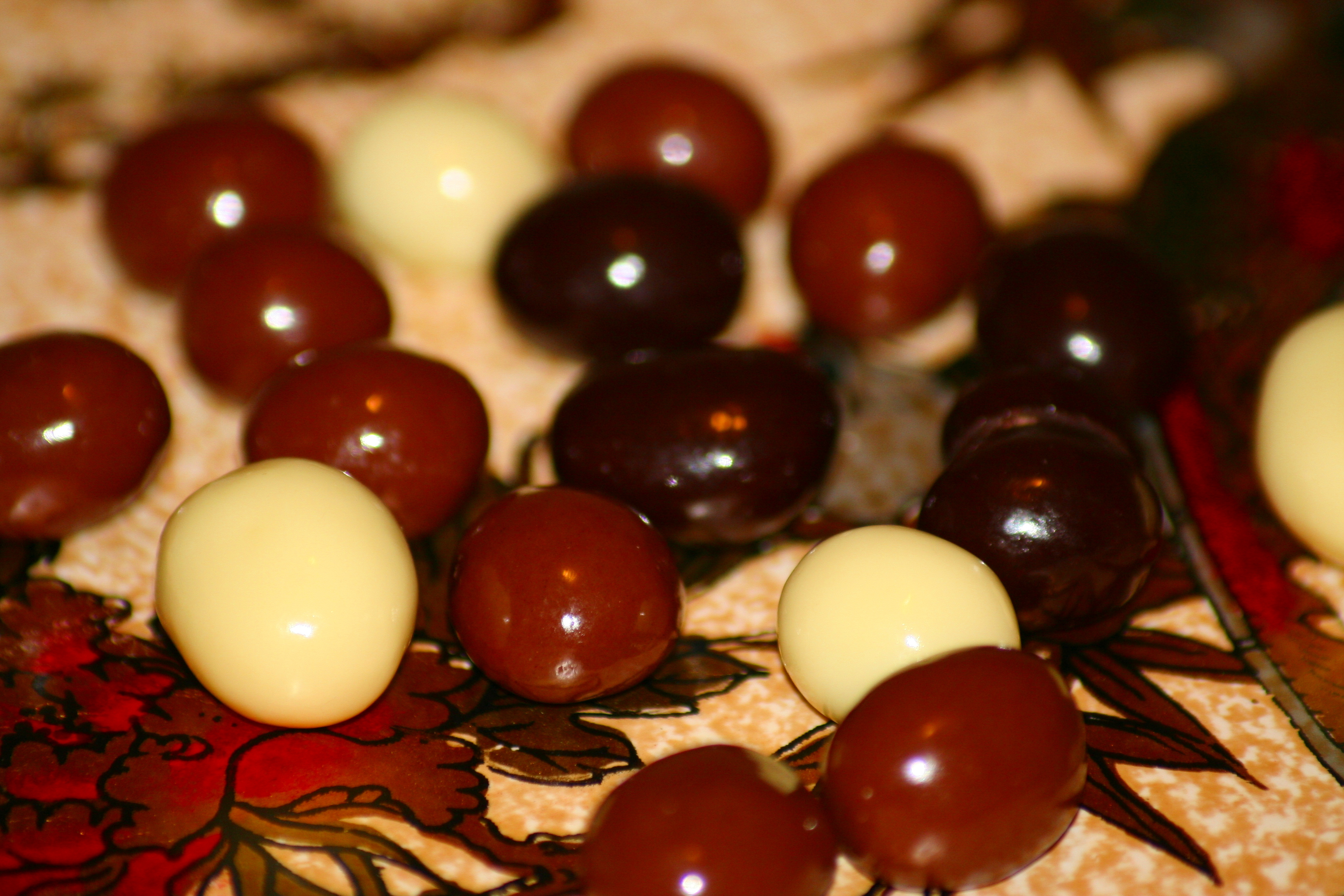
Chocolate-covered coffee beans

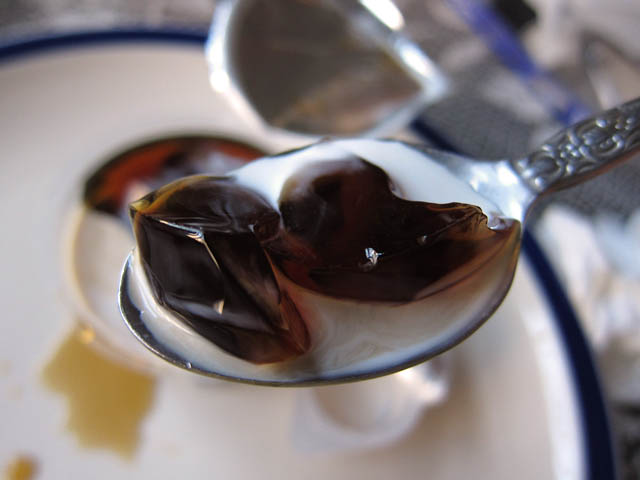
Coffee jelly

- Café liégeois – a cold dessert made from lightly sweetened coffee, coffee flavored ice cream and chantilly cream.
- Chocolate-covered coffee bean – eaten alone and used as a garnish on dishes and foods
- Coffee candy
- Coffee ice cream
- Coffee jelly
- Coffee sauce
- Espresso pork ribs
- Espresso rub
- Opera cake - an almond sponge cake flavored by dipping in coffee syrup, layered with ganache and coffee-flavored French buttercream, and covered in a chocolate glaze.
- Red-eye gravy
- Roti Kopi / Roti papa / Roti mama
- Tiramisu – prepared using coffee liqueur
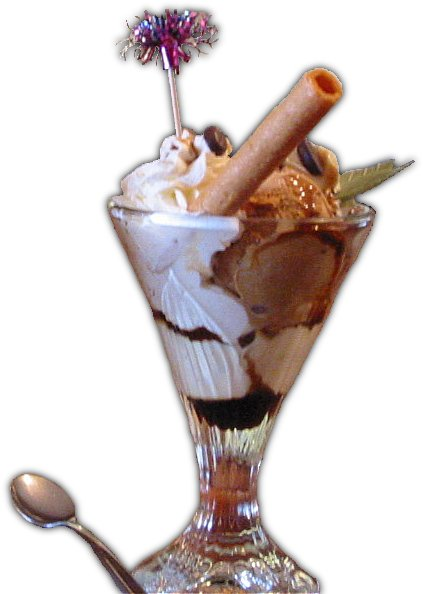
Café liégeois

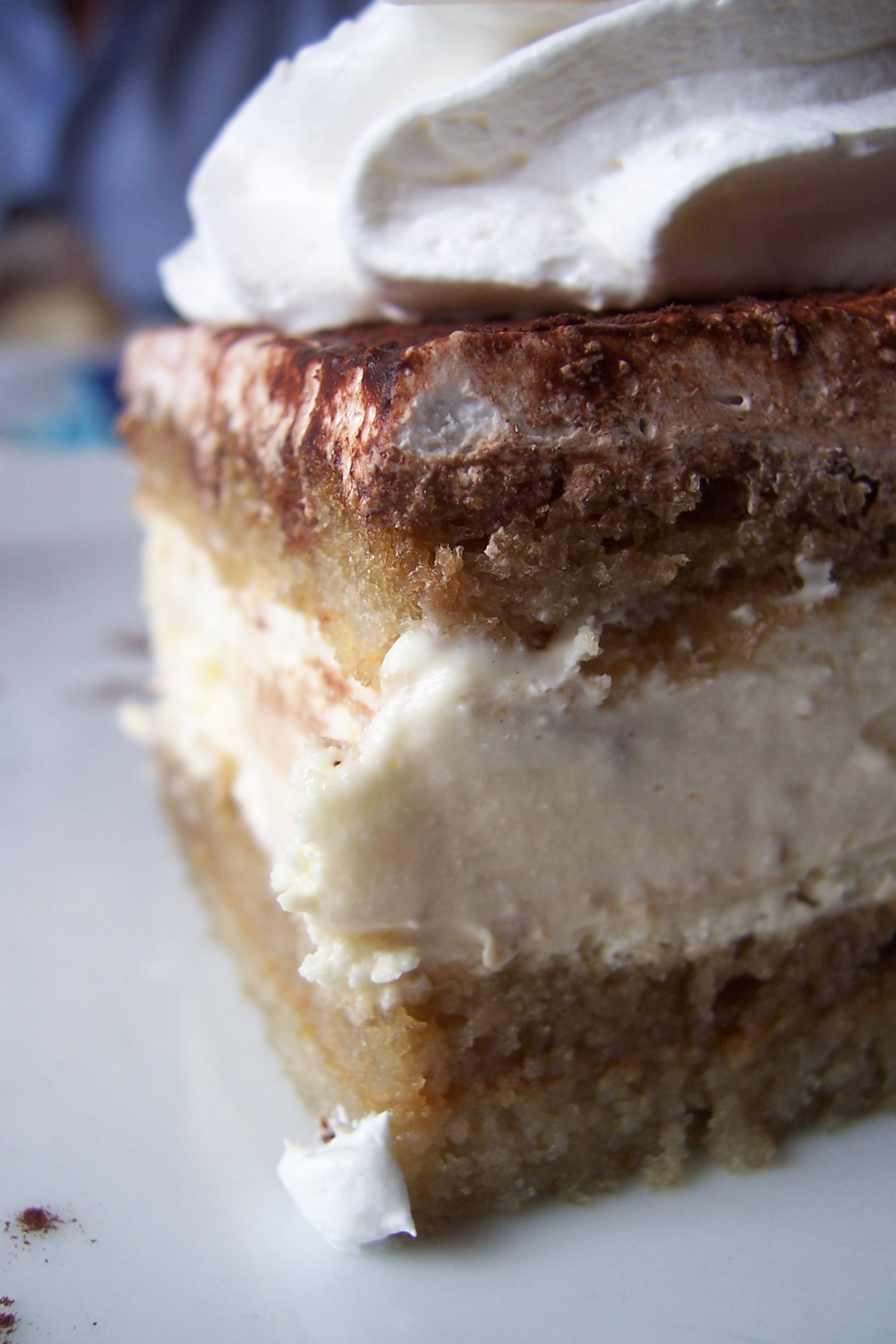
Tiramisu

== See also ==
- List of coffee beverages
