= Fideuà =

Seafood dish from Valencia, Spain

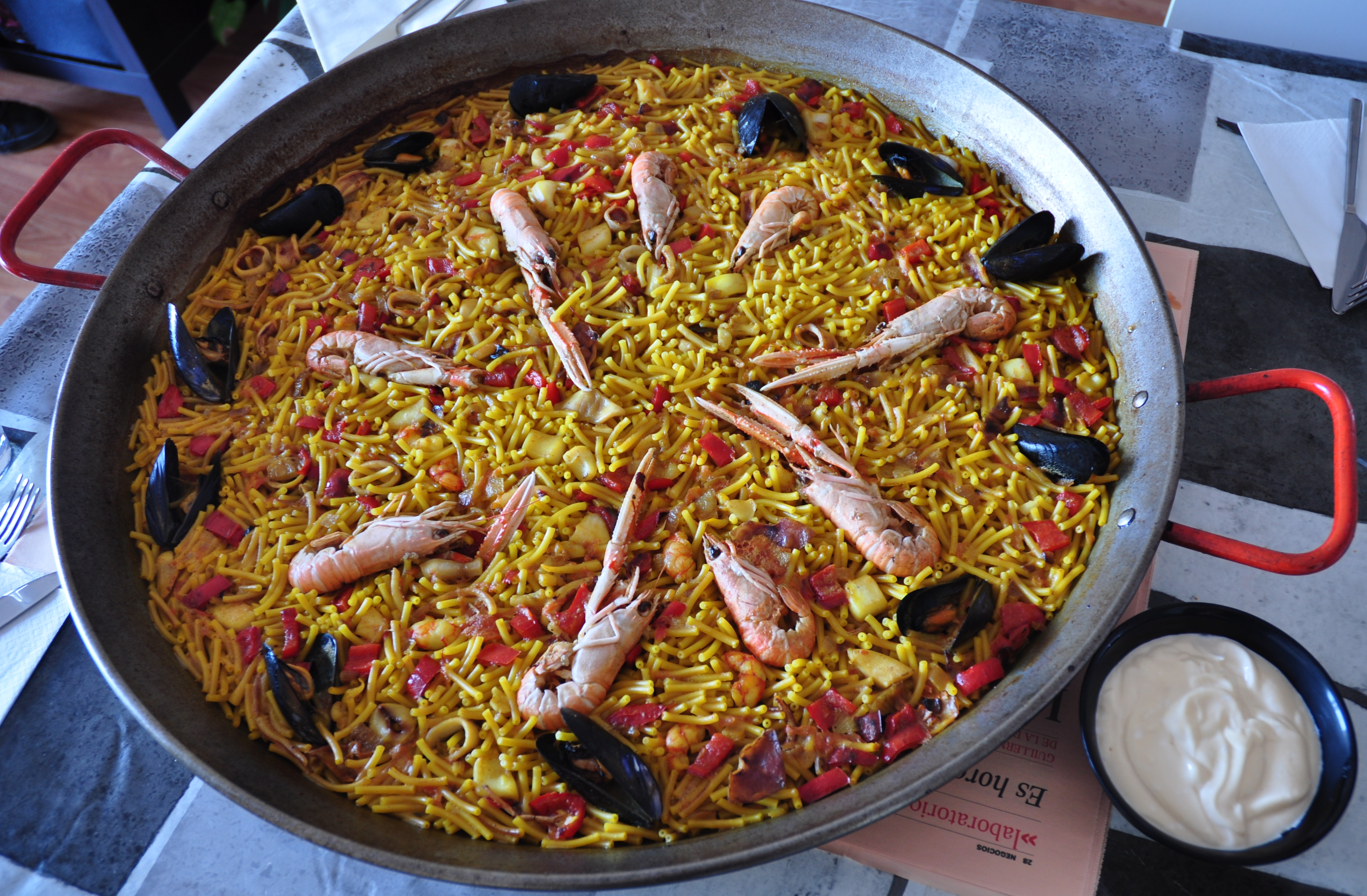
- Course: Pasta
- Place of origin: Spain
- Region or state: Valencian Community
- Main ingredients: Long pasta, white-fleshed fish, crustaceans

Fideuà (dialectal pronunciation of the Valencian word fideuada "large amount of noodles" from Andalusian Arabic fidáwš) is a seafood dish originally from the coast of Valencia that is similar to paella, and even more so to arròs a banda, but with pasta noodles instead of rice. Its main ingredients are pasta noodles (often hollow), fish (rockfish, monkfish, cuttlefish, squid), and shellfish (Squilla mantis, shrimp, crayfish). It is seasoned mainly with lemon.

== History ==
The invention of fideuà is attributed to a picturesque story. Around the year 1930 (some sources say 1915-1920) Gabriel Rodríguez Pastor, (Gabrielo from a kiosk in the port district of Grau in Gandia), worked as a cook on a boat and Juan Bautista Pascual (Zábalo), was the youngest man on the boat and his assistant. According to Gabriel's family, the boat captain loved rice and the rest of sailors almost never received their full portion of arròs a banda, the dish that the cook usually prepared. Trying to find a solution for the problem, the cook had the idea of using noodles instead of rice to see if the result was a little less appetizing for the captain.

The invention was liked, and fame of the dish spread to harbor restaurants such as the "Pastaora House", where they cooked the first "fideuades". The dish became distinctive and essential in the area.

== Characteristics ==
Just like paella, it is cooked in a special wide and flat frying pan, called paella (the word for "frying pan" in Catalan language), although there are other traditional variants made in a casserole.

The pasta is sautéed in stock, rather than boiled.

Gandia is the birthplace of fideuà, and in this city of La Safor region, there is an annual competition where the best cooks try to prepare the best fideuà.

== See also ==
- List of noodle dishes
- List of seafood dishes
- Pancit choca
