= Paella =

Rice dish from the Valencian Community, Spain

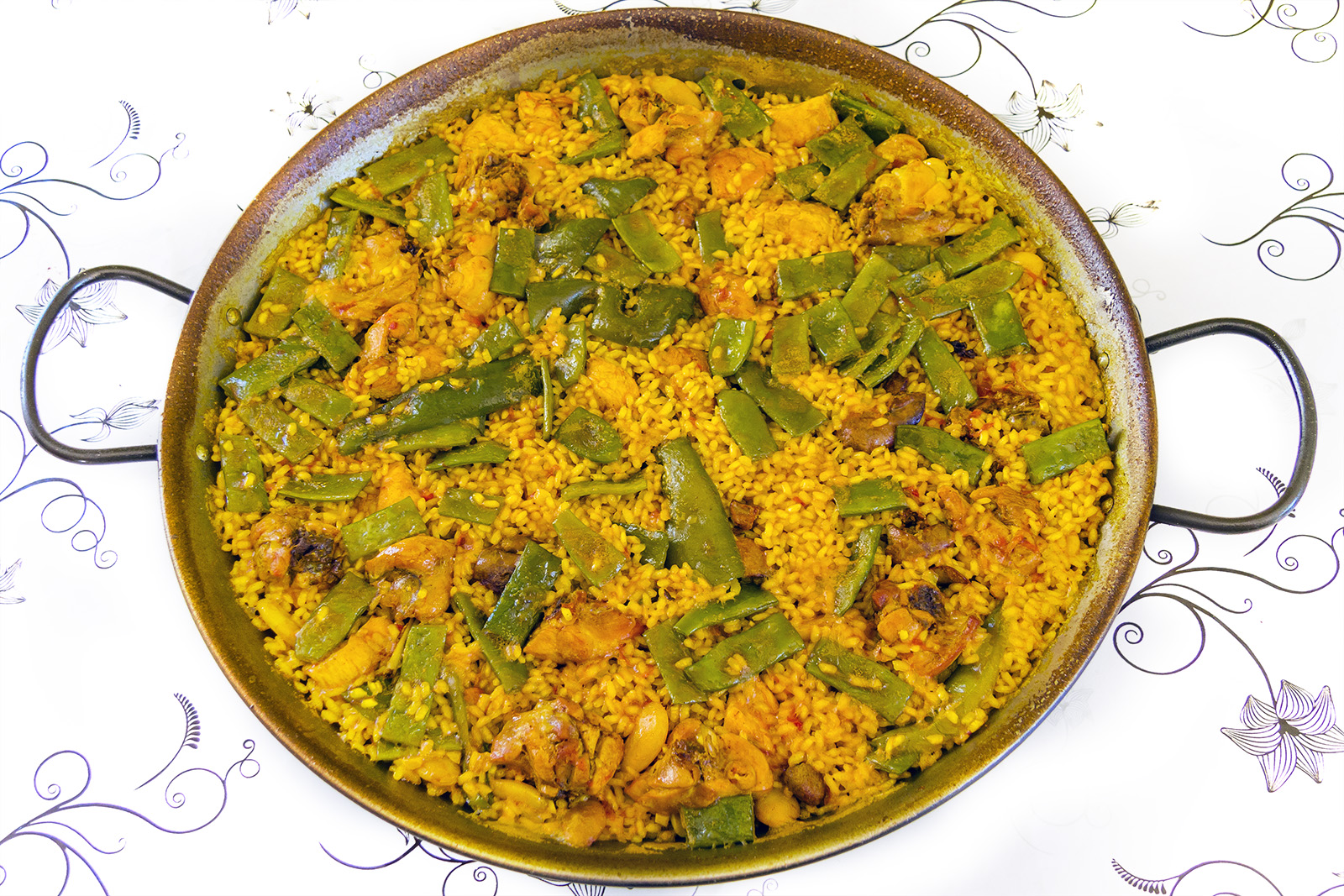
- Valencian paella
- Course: Main course
- Place of origin: Spain
- Region or state: Valencian Community
- Associated cuisine: Valencian cuisine, Spanish cuisine
- Serving temperature: Warm
- Main ingredients: Short-grain rice, meats (chicken, rabbit) or seafood, vegetables (green beans, lima beans), saffron
- Similar dishes: Paelya (in the Philippines), Fideuà

Paella (/paɪˈɛlə/ py-EL-ə, /pɑːˈeɪjə/ pah-AY-yə; Valencian: [paˈeʎa]; Spanish: [paˈeʎa] or [paˈeʝa]) is a rice dish originally from the Valencian Community. Paella is regarded as one of the community's identifying symbols.

There are three versions of paella: paella valenciana, which includes rabbit, chicken, duck, and snails; paella mixta, which includes livestock; and paella de marisco, which includes seafood. Valencians claim that only the recipe for paella valenciana is the true paella.

The dish takes its name from the wide, shallow traditional pan used to cook the dish on an open fire, paella being the word for a frying pan in both Catalan and the Valencian language. The word traces its roots further back to Old French and the Latin word "patella".

As a dish, it may have ancient roots, but in its modern form, it is traced back to the mid-19th century, in the rural area around the Albufera de València lagoon adjacent to Valencia.

Other popular local variations of paella are cooked throughout the Mediterranean area, the rest of Spain, and internationally. In Spain, paella is traditionally included in restaurant menus on Thursdays.

== History ==
=== Possible origins ===
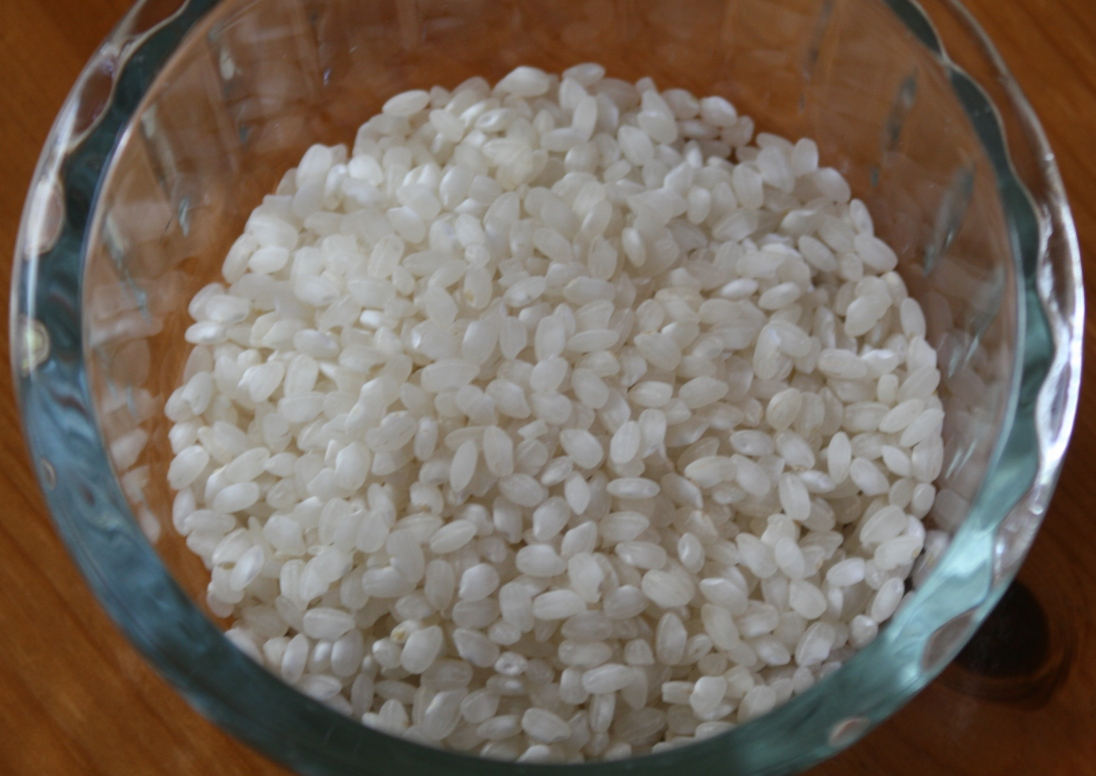
Raw bomba rice

Arabs in Al-Andalus began rice cultivation around the 10th century. Eastern Iberian Peninsula locals often made casseroles of rice, fish, and spices for family gatherings and religious feasts, thus establishing the custom of eating rice in Spain. This led to rice becoming a staple by the 15th century.

One likely theory is that paella was invented by Albufera rice farmers in the 15th century. Farmers gathered in the paddies to cook a one-pot dish with ingredients that were readily available in the surrounding fields: rice, snails, aquatic birds, green beans and water from the Albufera de València.

It became customary for cooks to combine rice with vegetables, beans, and dry cod, providing an acceptable meal for Lent. Along Spain's Mediterranean coast, rice was predominantly eaten with fish.

Spanish food historian Lourdes March noted in 1999 that the dish "symbolizes the union and heritage of two important cultures, the Roman, which gives us the utensil and the Arab which brought us the basic food of humanity for centuries: rice."

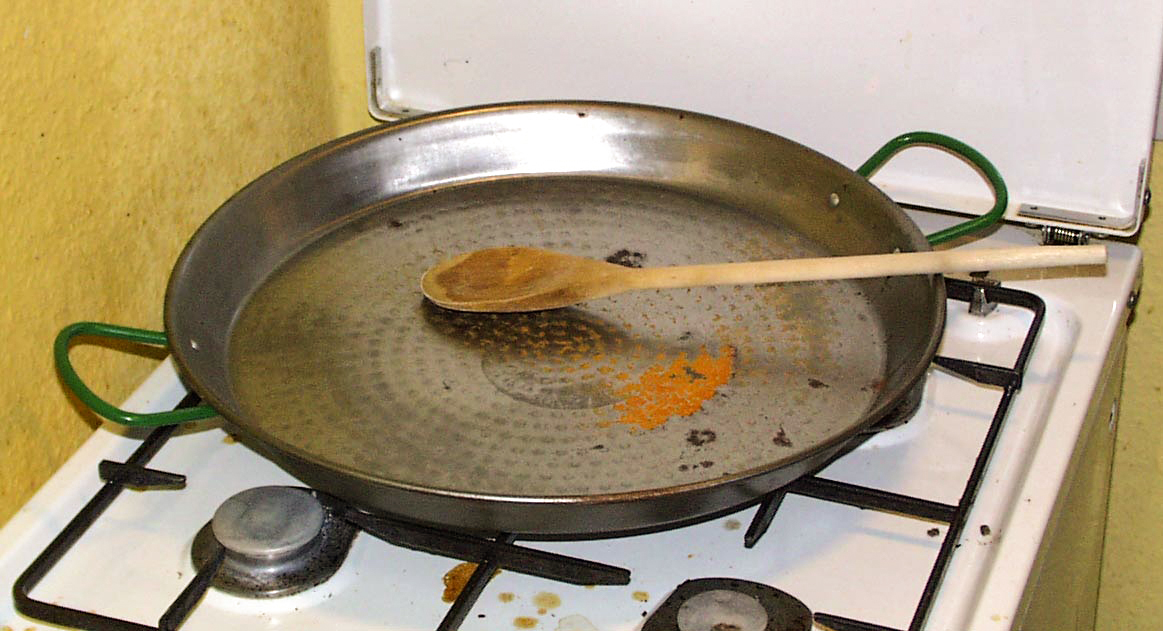
The traditional pan known as paella or paellera, along with a traditional wooden spoon used to stir and serve it

=== Naming, etymology and paellera ===
Paella is a Valencian word that means frying pan, from which the dish gets its name. Valencian speakers use the word paella for all pans, including the traditional shallow pan used for cooking the homonym dish. The pan is made of polished or coated steel with two side handles.

In many regions of Spain and other Spanish-speaking countries, the term paellera may be used for the traditional pan, while paella is reserved for the rice dish prepared in it. Both paella and paellera are correct terms for the pan.

According to the etymologist Joan Coromines, the Catalan word paella derives from the Old French word paelle for frying pan, which in turn comes from the Latin word patella for pan; he thinks that otherwise the word should be padella, as inter-vowel -d- dropping is not typical of Old Catalan.

The word paella is also related to paila used in many Latin American countries. Paila in Latin American Spanish refers to a variety of cookware resembling metal and clay pans, which are also used for both cooking and serving.

The Latin root patella from which paella derives is also akin to the modern French poêle, the Italian padella, and the Old Spanish padilla.

Some claim that the word paella comes from the Arabic بَقِيَّة baqiyya or ba'iyya, or the plural بَقَايَا baqāyā or ba'āyā, meaning "leftovers." This claim is based on the 8th-century custom in which Moorish kings' servants would take home the rice, chicken, and vegetables their employers left at the end of the meal. It has been said, however, that a problem with this etymology is that the word paella is not attested until six centuries after Moorish Valencia was conquered by James I.

== Versions and variations ==
=== Paella valenciana ===
Paella valenciana is the traditional paella of the Valencia region, believed to be the original recipe, and consists of Valencian rice, olive oil, rabbit, chicken, duck, snails, saffron or a substitute, tomato, ferradura or flat green bean, lima beans, salt and water. The dish is sometimes seasoned with whole rosemary branches. Traditionally, the yellow color comes from saffron, but turmeric, paprika, Calendula or artificial colorants can be used as substitutes. Artichoke hearts and stems may be used as seasonal ingredients. Most paella cooks use bomba rice, but a cultivar known as senia is also used in the Valencia region.

Originally, paella made in Valencia was a lunchtime meal for farmers and farm laborers. Workers would gather what was available to them around the rice fields. This often included tomatoes, onions, and snails. Rabbit or duck was a common addition, or chicken less often.

On special occasions, 18th-century Valencians used calderos to cook the rice in the open air of their orchards near lake Albufera. Water vole meat was one of the main ingredients of early paellas, along with eel and butter beans.

Novelist Vicente Blasco Ibáñez described the Valencia custom of eating water voles in Cañas y barro (novela) (1902), a realistic novel about life among the fishermen and peasants near lake Albufera.

Living standards rose with the sociological changes of the late 19th century in Spain, giving rise to gatherings and outings in the countryside. This led to a change in paella's ingredients, as well, using instead rabbit, chicken, duck, and sometimes snails. The dish became so popular that in 1840, a local Spanish newspaper first used the word paella to refer to the recipe rather than the pan, according to food historian Lynne Olver.

The most widely used, complete ingredient list of this era was: short-grain white rice, chicken, rabbit, snails (optional), duck (optional), navy beans, great northern beans, runner beans, artichoke (a substitute for runner beans in the winter), tomatoes, fresh rosemary, sweet paprika, saffron, garlic (optional), salt, olive oil, and water. Poorer Valencians sometimes used only snails for meat. Many Valencians insist that no more than these ingredients should go into making modern paella valenciana, and, in particular, that fish and shellfish are "absolutely out of the question." Another important rule, according to Valencians, is that fresh rosemary should not be added to paella valenciana made with rosemary-eating snails.

=== Seafood and mixed paella ===
Paella de marisco (seafood paella) replaces meat with seafood and omits beans and green vegetables, while paella mixta (mixed paella) combines meat from livestock, seafood, vegetables, and sometimes beans, with the traditional rice.

On the Mediterranean coast, Valencian fishermen used seafood instead of meat and beans to make paella. In this recipe, the seafood is served in the shell.

Spaniards living outside of Valencia combined seafood with meat from land animals to form mixed paella. This paella is sometimes called preparación barroca (baroque preparation) due to the variety of ingredients and its final presentation.

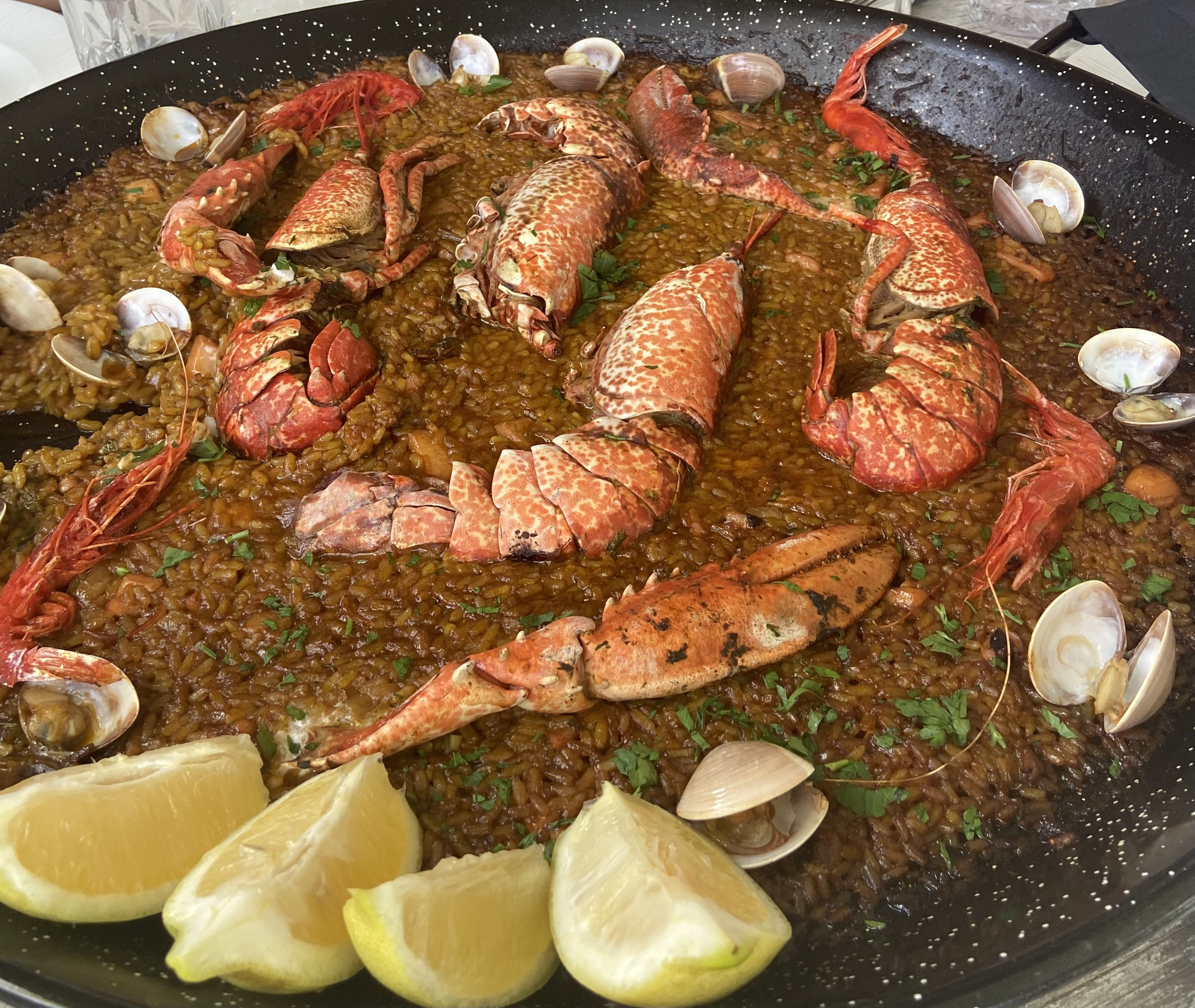
Arroz con bogavante (lobster) and clams

In 1959, Ernest Hemingway wrote about paella after a visit to Valencia; this helped popularize paella worldwide.

As other cultures set out to make paella, the dish invariably acquired regional influences. Consequently, paella recipes went from being relatively simple to including a wide variety of seafood, meat, sausage (including chorizo), vegetables and many different seasonings.

Throughout non-Valencia Spain, some restaurants providing this mixed version refer to it as Paella valenciana. However, Valencians insist that only the original two Valencia recipes are authentic.

Other Valencian recipes with similar preparations are arròs a banda and arròs del senyoret.

=== Philippines version ===
Arroz a la valenciana (Spanish) or Arroz à valenciana (Portuguese) is considered a part of Philippine cuisine and is regarded as the Philippine version of paella.

The Philippine version uses glutinous rice; otherwise, the ingredients are the same. In the Philippines, arroz a la valenciana refers to chicken, and longganisa (chorizo) versions.

=== Arroz con cosas ===
Some non-Spanish chefs include chorizo in their paellas and other ingredients, which Valencians assert do not belong in paella of any type. The alternative name proposed for these dishes, although pejorative, is arroz con cosas ('rice with things'). Famous cases are Jamie Oliver's paella recipe (which included chorizo) and Gordon Ramsay's. The author Josep Pla once noted: "The abuses committed in the name of Paella Valenciana are excessive – an absolute scandal."

However, in an article for El País, Spanish food writer Ana Vega 'Biscayenne', citing historical references, showed that traditional Valencian paella did indeed include chorizo, exclaiming, "Ah Jamie, we'll have to invite you to the Falles."

== Basic cooking methods ==
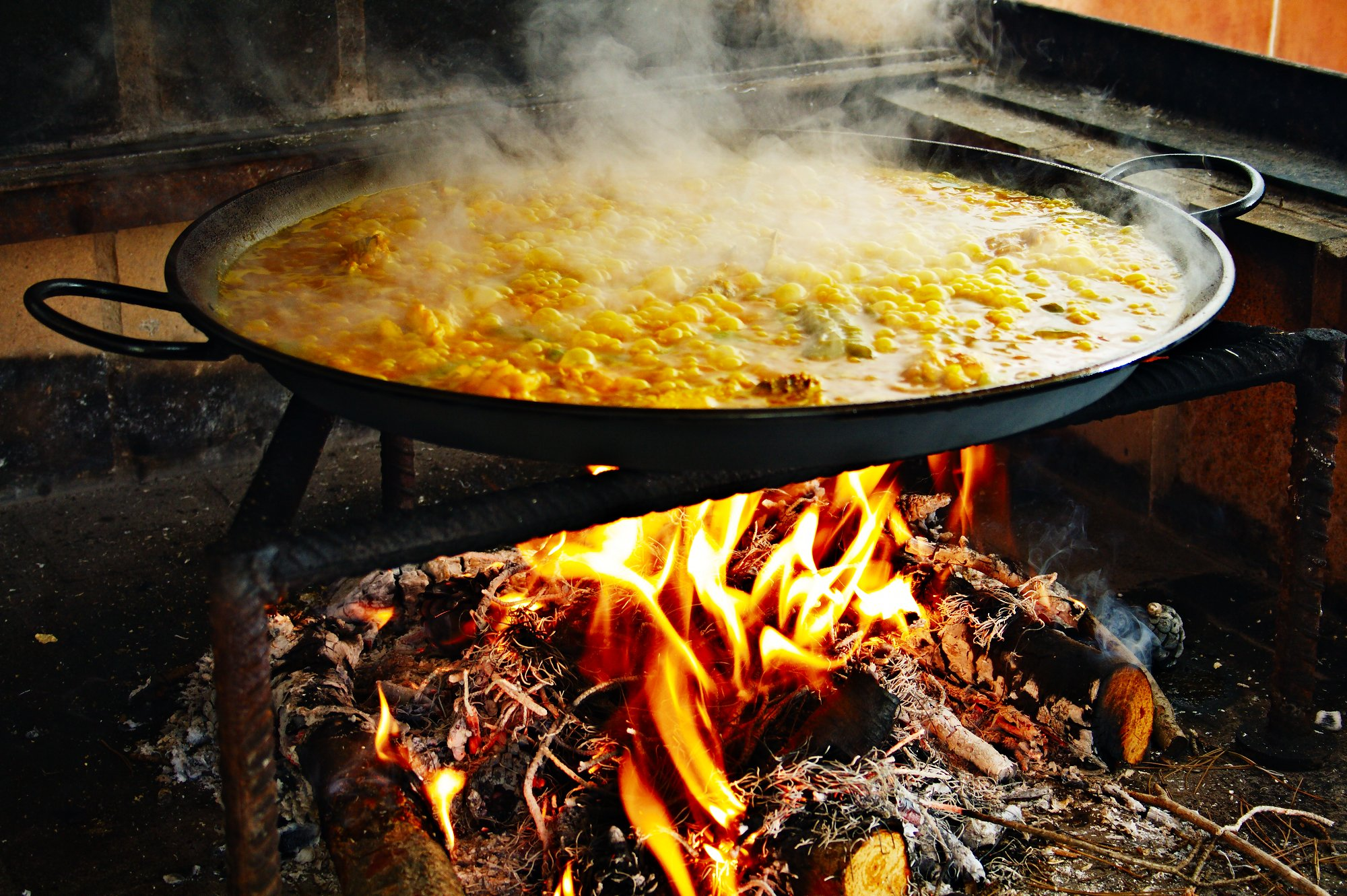
Traditional preparation of paella

According to tradition in Valencia, paella is cooked over an open fire, fueled by orange tree and pine branches and pine cones. This produces an aromatic smoke which infuses the paella. Also, dining guests traditionally eat directly out of the pan instead of serving in plates.

Some recipes call for paella to be covered and left to settle for five to ten minutes after cooking.

After cooking paella, a layer of scorched rice may be at the bottom of the pan, called socarrat in Valencià. The layer develops on its own if the paella is cooked over a burner or open fire. This is traditionally considered positive (as long as it is not burnt), and Valencia natives enjoy eating it.

== In popular culture ==
=== Competitions and records ===
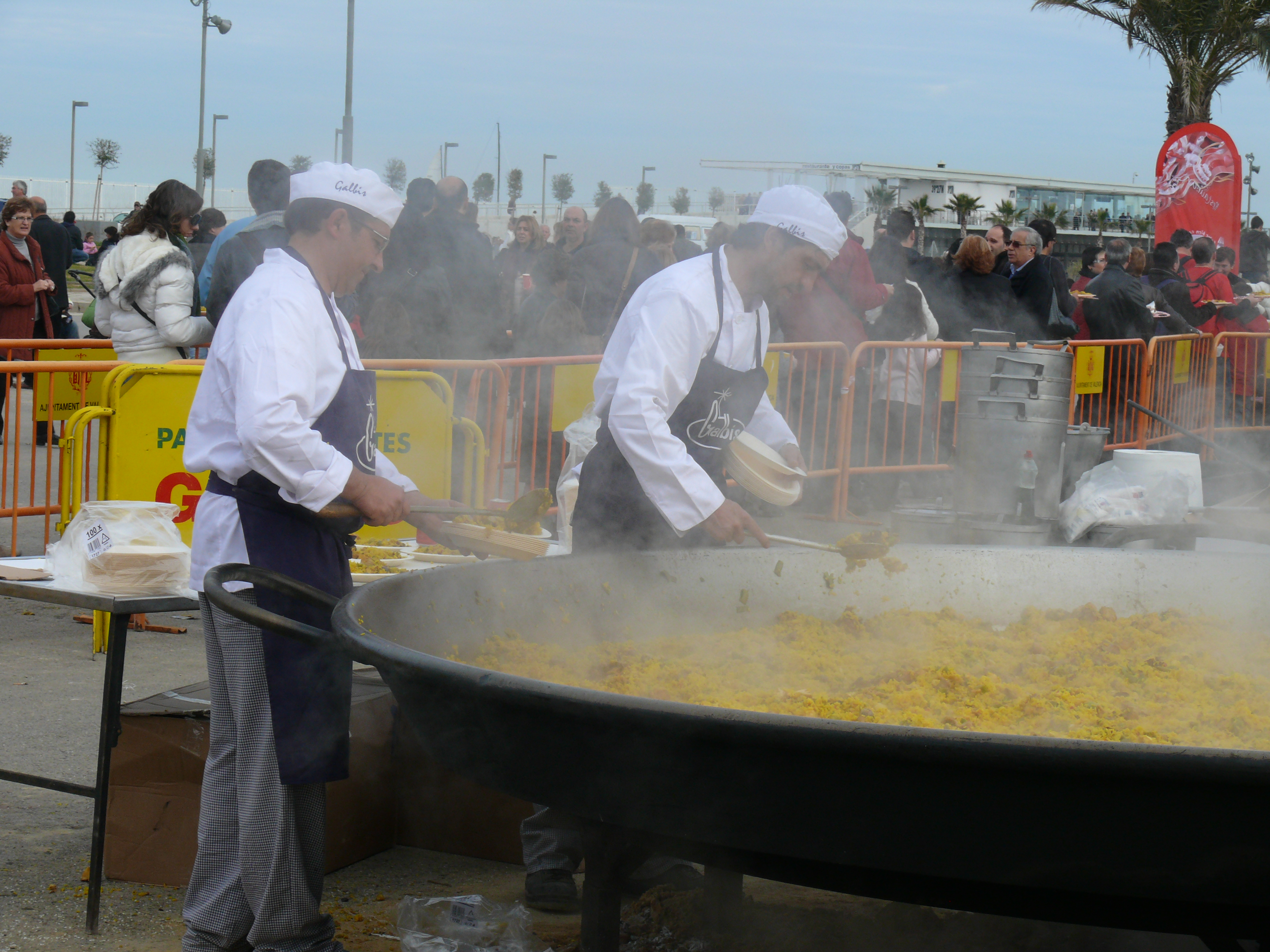
Giant paella being served

Paella has become a custom at mass gatherings in the Valencian Community (festivals, political campaigns, protests, etc.) to prepare enormous paellas, sometimes to win a place in the Guinness World Records book. Chefs use gargantuan paelleras for these events.

Valencia restaurateur Juan Galbis claims to have made the world's largest paella with help from a team of workers on 2 October 2001. This paella fed about 110,000 people, according to Galbis' former website. Galbis says this paella was even larger than his earlier world-record paella made on 8 March 1992, which fed about 100,000 people. Galbis' record-breaking 1992 paella is listed in Guinness World Records.

=== Paella emoji controversy: depiction of seafood in paella ===
Paella is often used to depict the "shallow pan of food" emoji.

In 2015, an emoji for paella was proposed to Unicode. The emoji was approved for Unicode 9.0 as U+1F958 "SHALLOW PAN OF FOOD" in June 2016. Apple Inc.'s version of the emoji originally depicted paella de marisco, but was later changed to a more traditional appearance with chicken after online controversy.

== Related dishes ==
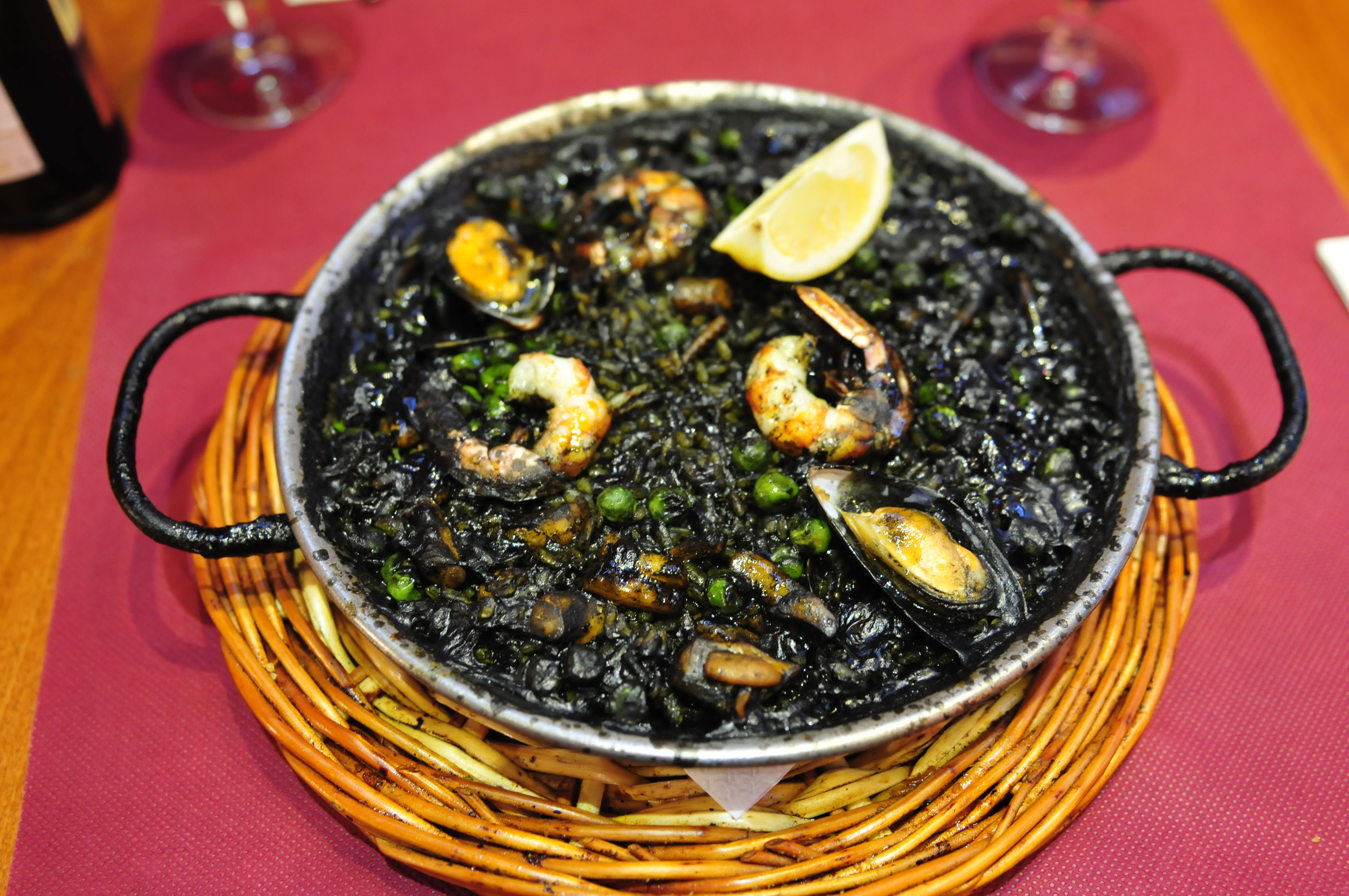
Arròs negre (also called arroz negro and paella negra)

Traditional Valencian cuisine offers recipes similar to paella valenciana and paella de marisco such as arròs negre, arròs al forn, arròs a banda and arròs amb fesols i naps since rice is the base of much of the local cuisine.

Fideuà is a Valencian pasta noodle dish variation cooked similarly in a paella. It may be served with allioli sauce.

Other related dishes:

- Arroz del senyoret – A seafood paella typical of Alicante, with chunks of grouper or squid and peeled prawns, so it is easier to eat. The name senyoret translates as "young gentleman".
- Arroz con costra (Crusted rice), so named because it is covered with an egg crust.
- Arroz a la valenciana – Latin American and Filipino adaptation of the Valencian style of cooking rice, uses annatto instead of saffron
- Arroz con gandules – Latin American (Caribbean) adaptation
- Arroz con pollo – Latin American adaptation with chicken
- Arroz de marisco – similar Portuguese dish
- Bringhe – pre-colonial Filipino dish derived from biryani dishes but merged with paella during the colonial period. Uses glutinous rice, turmeric, and coconut milk.
- Jambalaya – Louisiana dish influenced by paella and the French jambalaia from Provence
- Locrio – Dominican descendant of paella.
- Paelya – Filipino adaptation of paella that distinctively use glutinous rice, also uses annatto, turmeric, or safflower. Also spelled "paella", but pronounced without [ʎ].

== See also ==
- Biryani
- Jambalaya
- List of rice dishes
- Mediterranean cuisine
- Paelya
- Pilaf
- Risotto
- Spanish rice
- Valencian cuisine
