= Coffee sauce =

Culinary sauce that includes coffee

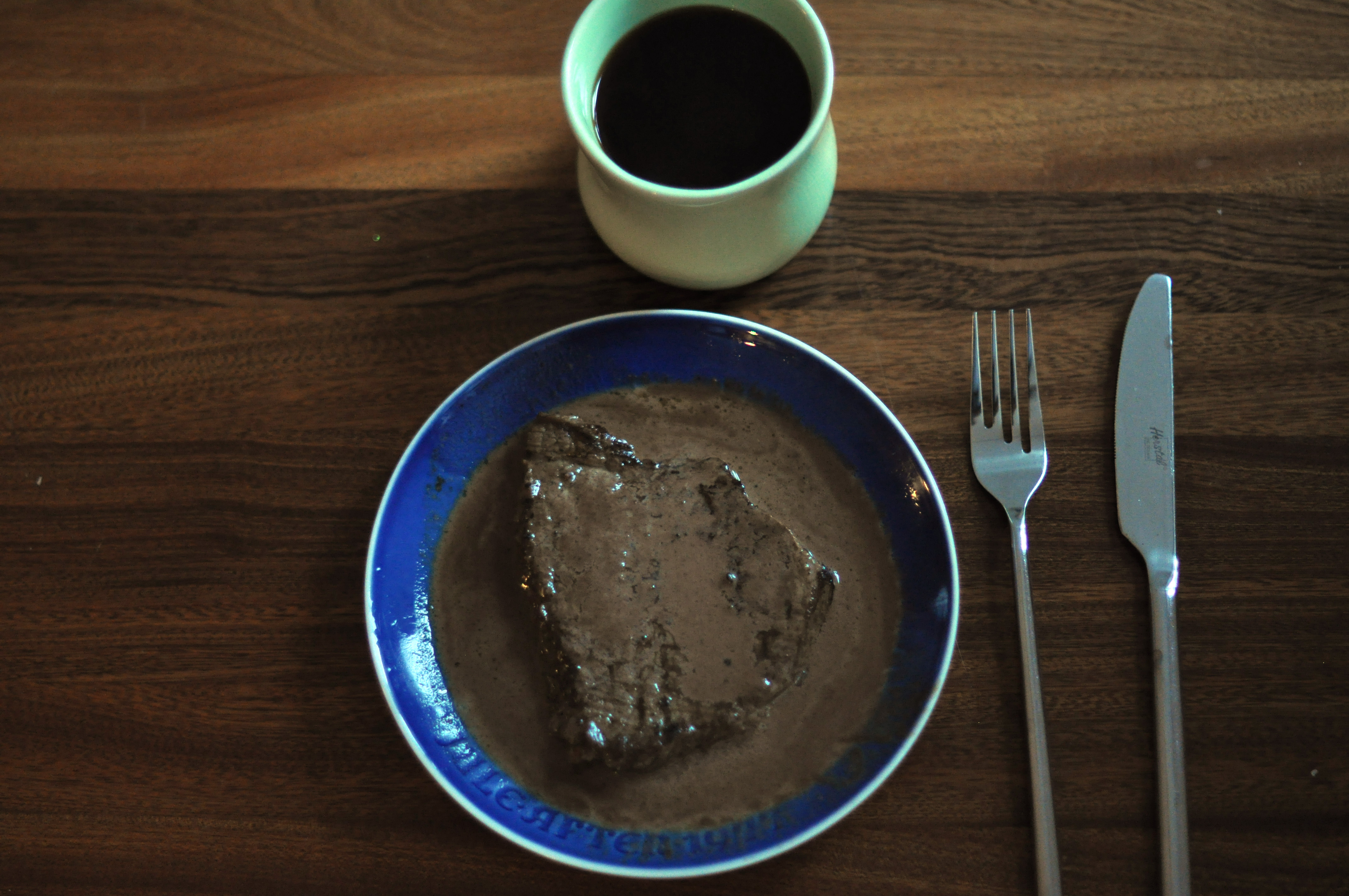
A steak served with coffee sauce

Coffee sauce is a culinary sauce that includes coffee in its preparation. It is sometimes prepared using instant coffee. Coffee sauce has been used in American cuisine since at least 1904. Coffee sauce may be sweet or savory.

Sweet preparations may use sweeteners such as sugar, simple syrup, maple syrup or golden syrup. Evaporated milk is sometimes used in sweet versions of coffee sauce, and some versions use whiskey to add flavor. Additional ingredients in some preparations include eggs and whipped cream.

== Uses ==
Sweet uses of the sauce include its use on cakes, chestnuts, flan, ice cream, pancakes, puddings, tortes, soufflés, sweet potatoes and waffles.

Savory uses of the sauce include its use on salmon and steak.

== Commercial preparations ==
A mass-produced coffee sauce has been manufactured for consumer purchase by the company Ahh!Gourmet, under the brand name Perky Savory Coffee Sauce.

== See also ==
- Coffee syrup – syrup produced from water, sugar, and coffee grounds, used primarily in the preparation of coffee milk
- List of coffee dishes
- List of sauces
- Red-eye gravy – a thin sauce often seen in the cuisine of the Southern United States that sometimes includes black coffee in its preparation
