= Coffee ice cream =

Ice cream flavor

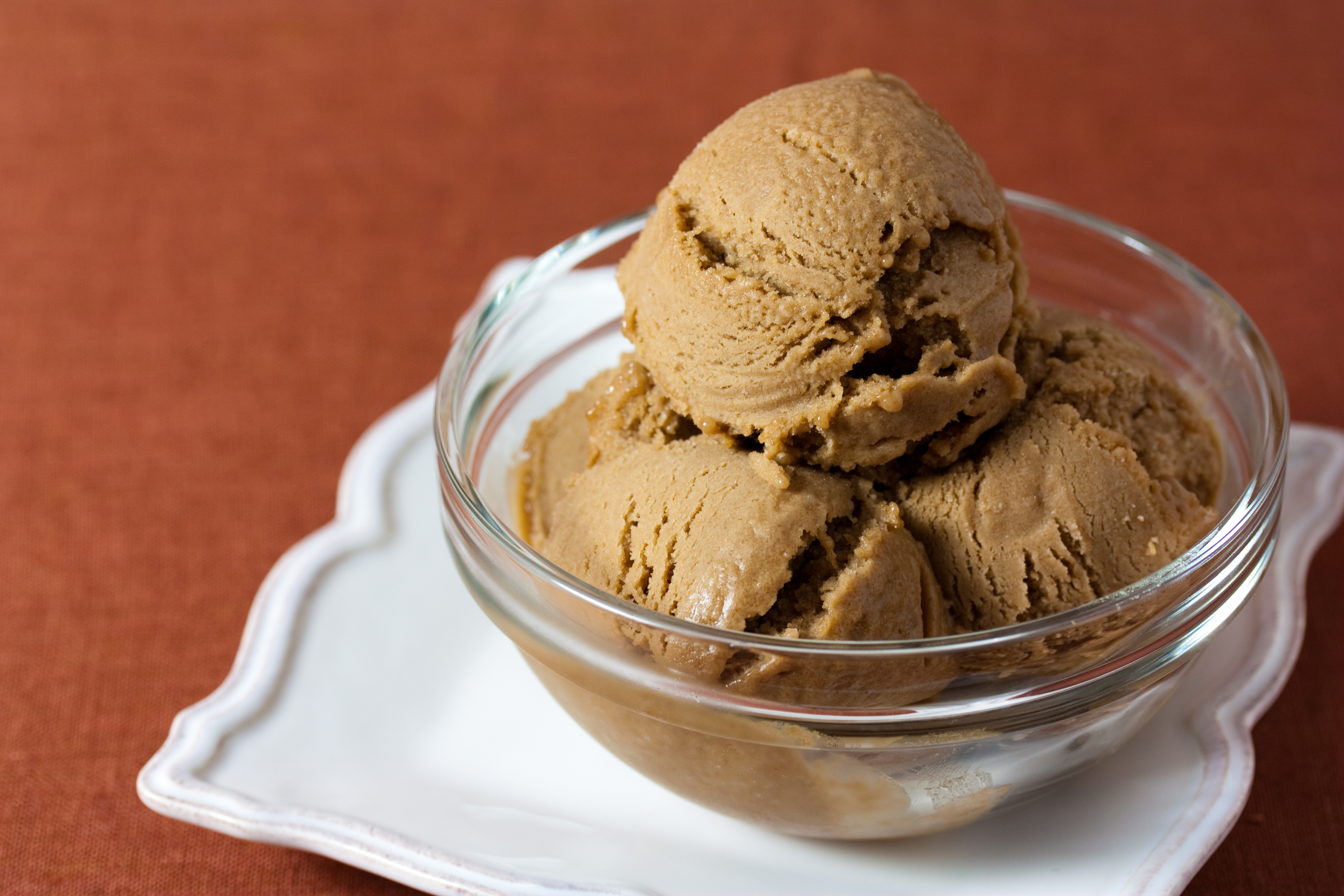
Vegan hazelnut coffee ice cream

Coffee ice cream is an ice cream flavor made with coffee or coffee flavoring.

== History ==
The earliest known appearance of the flavor was in 1869, when it was used in a coffee parfait. Many ice cream brands also combine coffee ice cream with other ingredients such as nuts, caramel or chocolate. A recipe for a similar dessert called egg coffee, consisting of cream, crushed ice, and coffee syrup, was printed in a 1919 cookbook. When Häagen-Dazs first launched in 1960, coffee was one of the three flavors that it offered, the other two being chocolate and vanilla.

Coffee is one of the most popular ice cream flavors in the United States. An Instacart evaluation from June 2022 to May 2023 found that it was the most popular flavor of ice cream in the states of Hawaii, Massachusetts, New Mexico and Rhode Island. A celebration known as National Coffee Ice Cream Day occurs annually on September 6.

== See also ==
- Affogato
