= Red-eye gravy =

Type of gravy

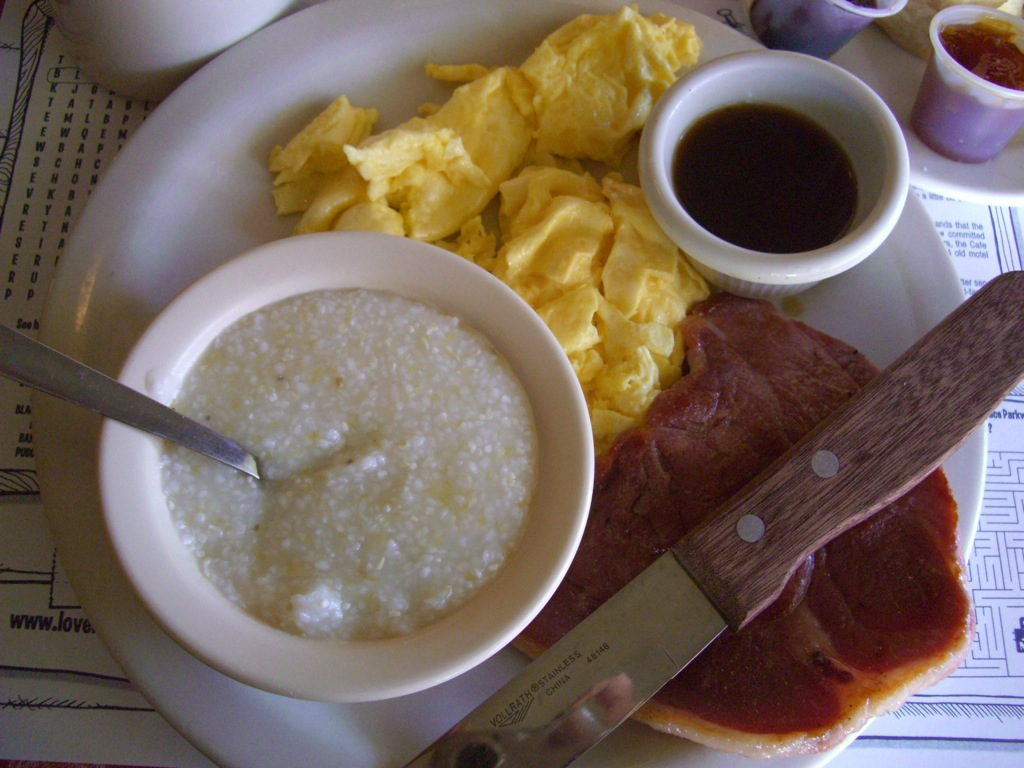
- Red-eye gravy (in small bowl) served as part of a Southern breakfast
- Type: Sauce
- Course: Side dish
- Place of origin: United States
- Region or state: American South
- Main ingredients: Country ham grease

Red-eye gravy is a thin sauce often seen in the cuisine of the Southern United States and associated with the country ham of that region. Other names for this sauce include poor man's gravy, bird-eye gravy, bottom slop, cedar gravy, and red ham gravy. The gravy is made from the drippings of pan-fried country ham mixed with black coffee. Red-eye gravy is often served over ham, grits or biscuits.

A common practice is to dip the inner sides of a split biscuit into the gravy in order to add flavor and keep the biscuit from being too dry when a piece of country ham is added between the two halves, sometimes called the Southern "ham biscuit". (The Appalachian ham biscuit is simply a biscuit with country ham.) Another popular way to serve red-eye gravy, especially in parts of Alabama, is with mustard or ketchup mixed in with the gravy. Biscuits are then dipped in the gravy.

In Louisiana, Cajun cuisine-style gravy is made with roast beef instead of ham. Black coffee is always used, and it is frequently a strongly brewed coffee substitute made from chicory. The gravy is ladled over the meat on a bed of rice, staining the rice a dark brown color. Often, French bread and some kind of beans, like butter beans, lima beans, or peas, are served as side dishes.

== Origin ==
Red-eye gravy's name comes from its distinct appearance. Prepared traditionally, with coffee and grease combined in the final step (see Preparation below), a heterogeneous mixture forms with the water-based coffee sinking to the bottom and the oil-based grease forming the top layer. In a round bowl the mixture looks much like a red human eye. Use of red pepper enhances the redness of the appearance.

Less traditional preparation techniques do not always result in the "red eye" appearance, leading to folk legends surrounding the origin of the name. For instance, one story is that former United States President Andrew Jackson requested ham with gravy as red as his cook's eyes, which were bloodshot from drinking the night before, or that the black coffee in the gravy will keep people awake.

== Preparation ==
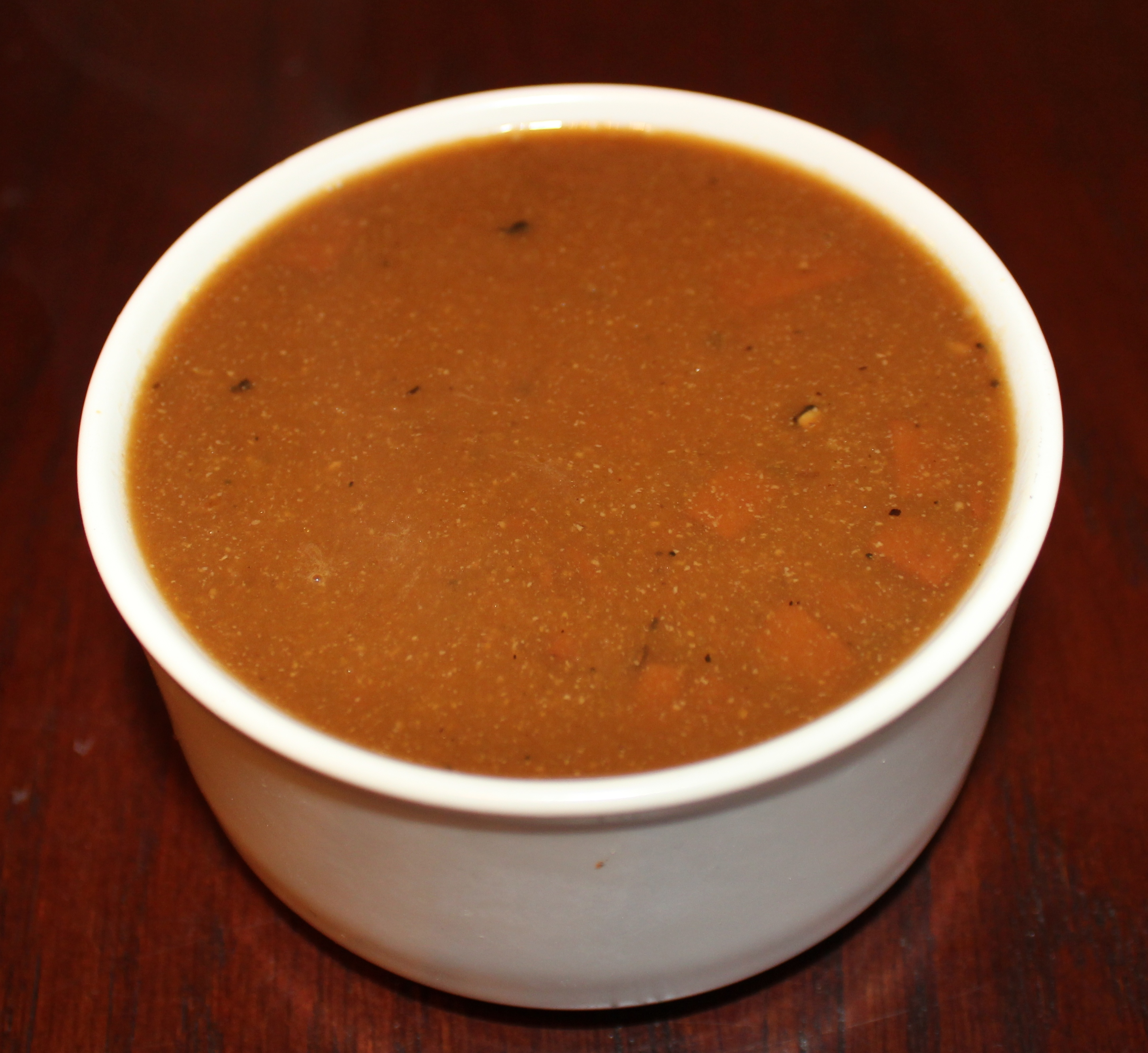
Red-eye gravy made with a vegetarian ham substitute

After a ham has been cooked, the grease is removed from the pan. Black coffee is then used to deglaze the pan. The coffee and grease are then poured into the same container in a one-to-one ratio.

Other recipes exist, using water instead of coffee, or adding coffee with grease still present in the pan. When the coffee is added to the grease in this manner, a heterogeneous mixture may result that lacks the "red eye" appearance.

Florida crackers referred to tomato gravy as red-eye gravy, and prepared it in much the same way by adding flour and tomatoes to bacon grease. This is served with fried catfish or other fish.

== See also ==
- Coffee sauce
- List of coffee dishes
- List of gravies
- Red gravy
- Sawmill gravy, which is sometimes confused with red-eye gravy.
