= Red gravy =

Red gravy may refer to:

- Red-eye gravy
- Creole sauce
- An Italian-American term for a tomato sauce
