= John Harrison (ice cream taster) =

American ice cream taster (born 1942)

- Born: 1942 (age 83–84); California
- Occupation: Ice cream taster

John Harrison (born 1942) is an American ice cream taster, who worked for ice cream company Dreyer's (also known as Edy's) as its "Official Taste Tester" from 1980 to 2010.

== Career ==
Harrison joined Dreyer's in 1980, serving until his retirement in 2010, tasting on average sixty ice cream flavors daily. Harrison typically only tasted the ice cream. He used lukewarm water and an unsalted crackers as a palate cleanser. Based on his own estimates, he has tasted a few hundred million gallons of ice cream at Dreyer's. He has aided in the creation of more than one hundred unique ice cream flavors; he claims that he invented the flavor Cookies n' Cream. According to a World report on Harrison, "his taste buds are so fine-tuned he can immediately taste the difference between 12-percent and 11.5-percent butterfat in a product." The report also described him as the "most popular ice cream man in America". Harrison believes himself to be "the first national spokesman on ice cream". He has appeared on many television programs, as well as on other media. In 1997, Harrison was awarded the American Tasting Institute's Master Taster of the Year title.

== Personal life ==
Born in 1942, all of Harrison's paternal family, up to his great grandfather, were involved in the ice cream industry in one way or another. In his younger days, he would help out at the ice cream factory his uncle owned. His father owned an ice cream ingredient company in Atlanta and his grandfather ran several ice cream parlors in New York. His uncle owned an ice cream factory. Harrison is married and currently resides in Palm Desert, California. Harrison's taste buds are insured for a million dollars. He adheres to a very strict diet, avoiding alcohol, caffeine, onions, garlic and spicy foods so as not to affect his tasting skills.

Harrison is a Christian who has preached as part of Prison Fellowship.
