= Arroz de marisco =

Portuguese seafood rice dish

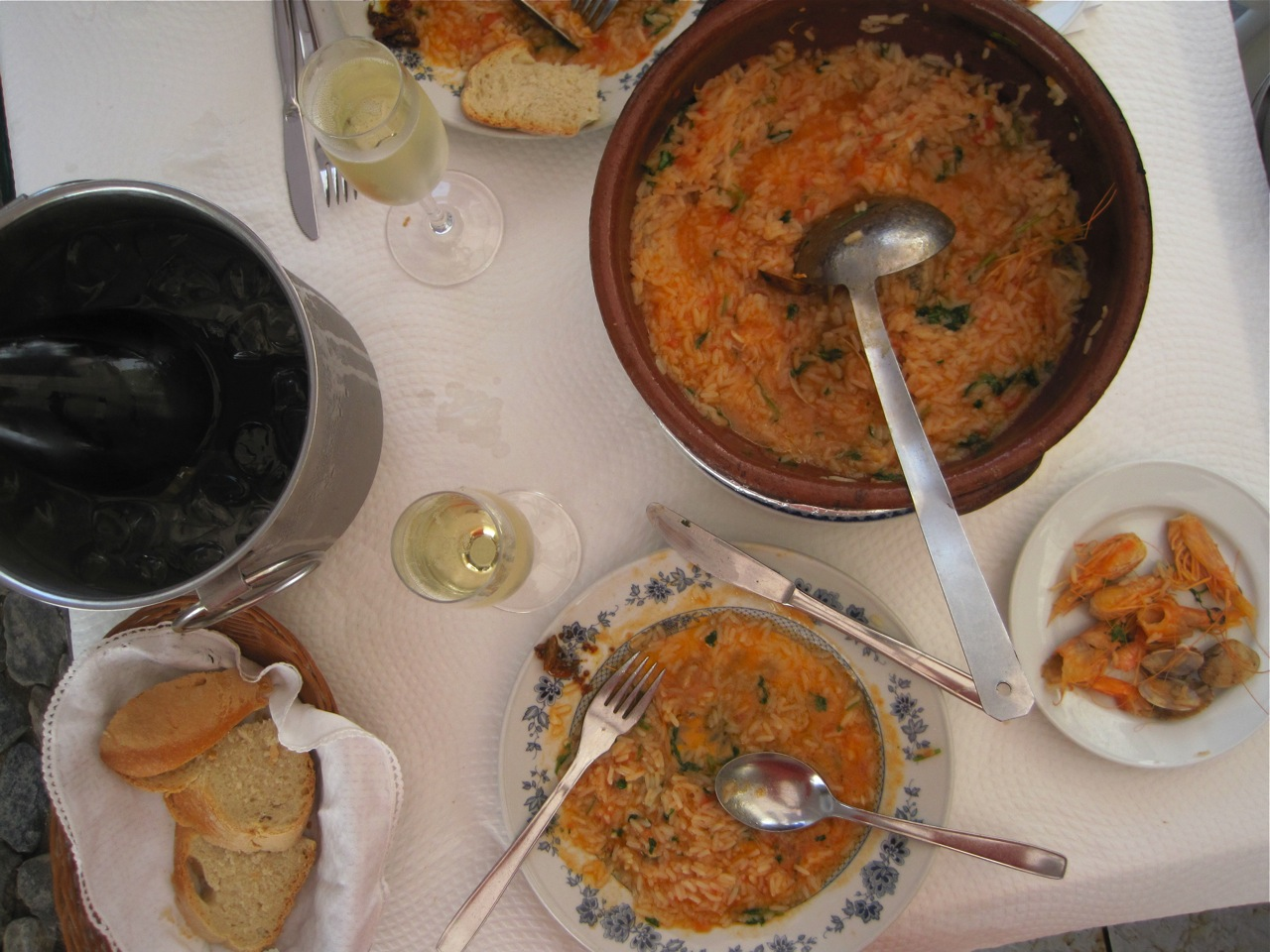
- Course: Main course
- Place of origin: Portugal
- Main ingredients: Rice, seafood

Arroz de marisco is a Portuguese dish containing rice and seafood. Typical ingredients may include shellfish, squid, white wine, and fish. It is similar to Spanish paella.
