= Strawberry ice cream =

Flavor of ice cream

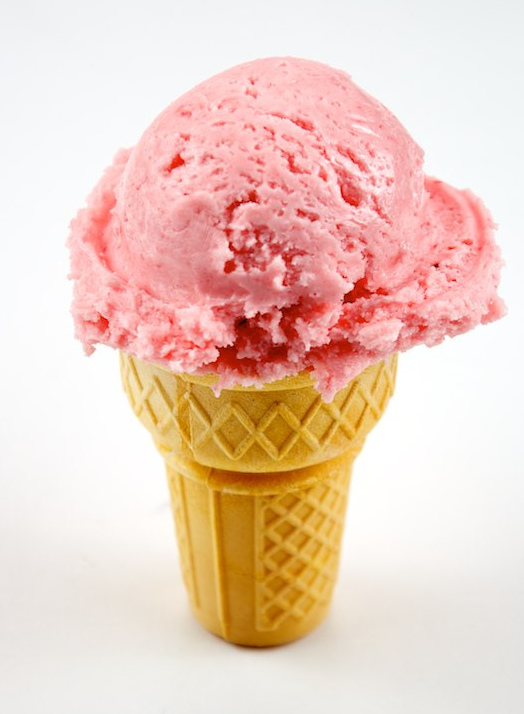
- A strawberry ice cream cone
- Type: Ice cream
- Region or state: United States
- Main ingredients: Strawberries, eggs, cream, vanilla, sugar

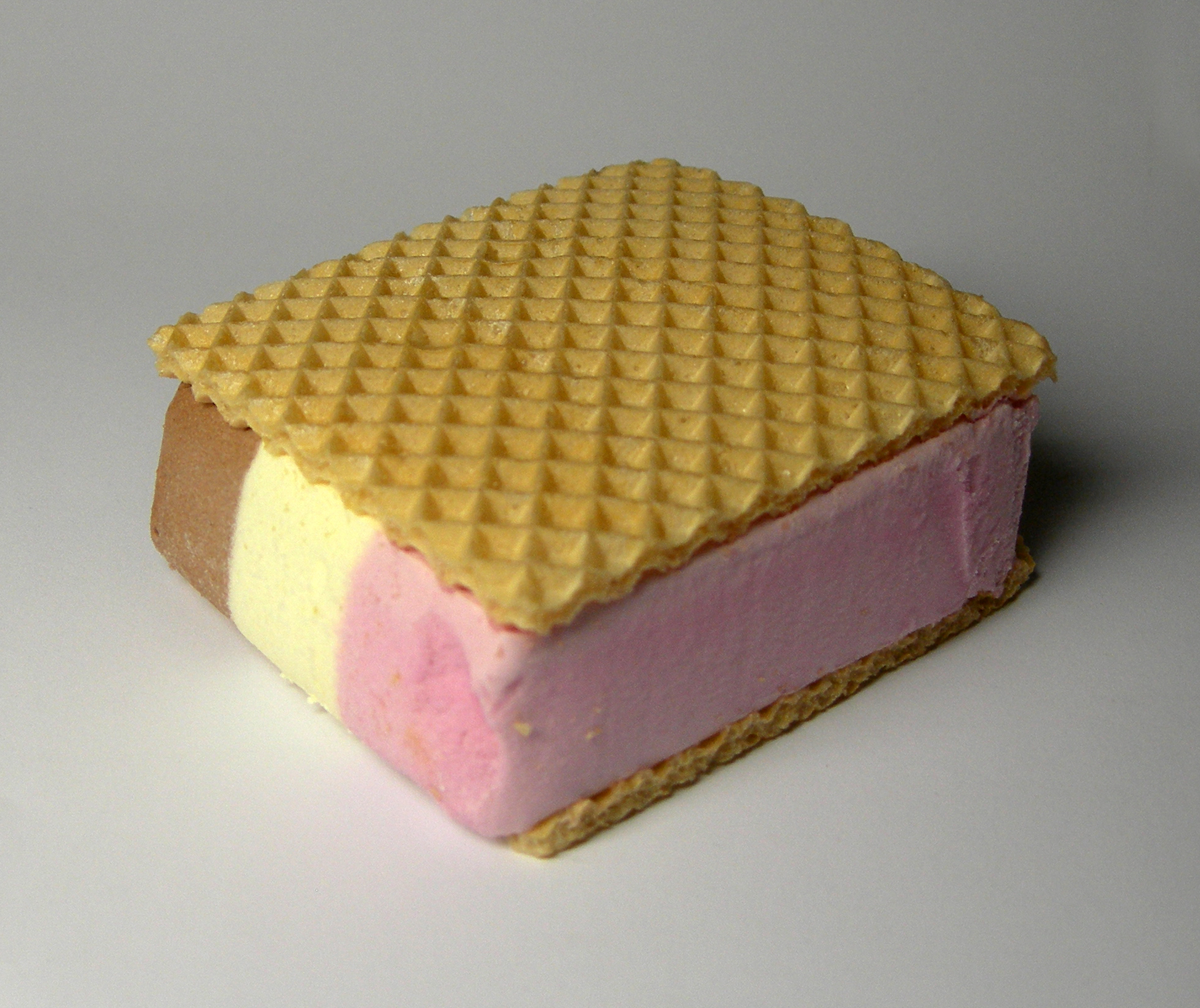
Neapolitan ice cream sandwich

Strawberry ice cream is a flavor of ice cream made with strawberry or strawberry flavoring. It is made by blending in fresh strawberries or strawberry flavoring with the eggs, cream, vanilla, and sugar used to make ice cream. Most strawberry ice cream is colored pink or light red. Along with vanilla and chocolate ice cream, strawberry is one of the three flavors in Neapolitan ice cream. Variations of strawberry ice cream include strawberry cheesecake ice cream and strawberry ripple ice cream, which is vanilla ice cream with a ribbon of strawberry jam or syrup. Some ice cream sandwiches are prepared Neapolitan-style and include strawberry ice cream.

== History ==
The earliest account of strawberry ice cream occurred in 1744, when Thomas Bladen, the governor of Maryland, served a dessert of frozen strawberries and ice cream to commissioners. At the time of its creation, it was among some of the earliest ice-cream flavors ever created.

Strawberries were among the earliest fruit flavors used in ice cream, appearing in Britain and North America during the eighteenth century when strawberries were commonly served with frozen cream desserts.

In the early 19th century, berries were used to flavor and color a frozen dairy dessert created by Sallie Shadd, a freed slave whose family ran a tearoom in Wilmington, Delaware.

In 1813, James Madison's wife and first lady, Dolley Madison, served it at his second inaugural banquet at the White House. It has since been voted as the 8th most popular ice cream in America.

From 1856 to 1859, Mary Todd Lincoln, wife of Abraham Lincoln was noted for frequently hosting Strawberry Parties in Springfield, Illinois to commemorate berry season. These parties included many treats, such as strawberry ice cream and were hosted before her husband, Abraham Lincoln's time as president.

Advances in refrigeration and industrial ice cream production during the late nineteenth and early twentieth centuries helped transform strawberry ice cream from a seasonal specialty into a commercially available flavor throughout the year.

During World War II, the United States military regarded ice cream as an important morale food. The U.S. Navy operated refrigerated barges capable of producing and storing large quantities of ice cream for personnel stationed in the Pacific.

Stores quickly noticed the boom in Strawberry Ice Cream in the early-to-middle 20th Century. A major brand, Baskin Robbins became one of the first stores to adopt the flavor.

According to a poll among American adults from July 13–18 of 2022, 43 percent of respondents stated that they enjoy strawberry ice cream while 6 percent stated that strawberry ice cream was their favorite flavor of ice cream. National Strawberry Ice Cream Day is celebrated every year on January 15.

== Availability ==
Strawberry ice cream is commonly sold in restaurants, diners, cafés, candy shops, dessert bars, supermarkets and stores like ice cream parlours, which specialise in frozen desserts. Strawberry is one of the most common ice cream flavours and is often used in combination with other flavours. Along with vanilla and chocolate, strawberry is traditionally considered one of 'the 'big three' of ice cream flavours.

== See also ==
- List of strawberry dishes

== Bibliography ==
- Clarke, Chris (2004), The Science of Ice Cream, Royal Society of Chemistry, ISBN 978-0-85404-629-4
- Funderburg, Anne Cooper (1995), Chocolate, Strawberry, and Vanilla: A History of American Ice Cream, Popular Press, ISBN 978-0-87972-692-8
- Goff, H Douglas; Hartel, Richard W (17 January 2013), Ice Cream, Springer, ISBN 978-1-4614-6096-1
- Quinzio, Jeri (2009), Of Sugar and Snow: A History of Ice Cream Making, University of California Press, ISBN 978-0-520-94296-7
- Tharp, Bruce W.; Young, L. Steven (2012), Tharp & Young on Ice Cream: An Encyclopedic Guide to Ice Cream Science and Technology, DEStech Publications, Inc, ISBN 978-1-932078-68-8
