= Lynne Olver =

American food historian (1958–2015)

- Born: March 10, 1958
- Died: April 14, 2015 (aged 57)
- Known for: The Food Timeline website

Academic background
- Education: University at Albany, SUNY

Academic work
- Discipline: Culinary history
- Website: foodtimeline.org

Lynne Olver (March 10, 1958 – April 14, 2015) was a librarian and food historian, and the sole author of the Food Timeline website.

== Personal life ==
Olver graduated from the University of Albany (SUNY). She was a librarian at the Morris County Library, New Jersey, and became its director in 2009.

== The Food Timeline ==
In 1999, Olver created The Food Timeline, a history website documenting culinary history, food history and recipes. Unlike many other food related websites, Olver gave citations to almost every statement on her site so that readers can verify her claims. Her research has been cited in peer-reviewed journals.

In 2020, it was reported that the Olver family was searching for a person or persons to maintain and possibly grow the website.

=== Virginia Tech ===
On November 11, 2020, the Olver family announced on the Food Timeline's Twitter account that they selected the Virginia Tech's Food Studies Program to be the new curators for Olver's website after reviewing over 80 other applicants. The Food Studies Program thanked Eater writer Dayna Evans for bringing the Virginia Tech unit in contact with the Olver family. The Food Studies Program is headed by history professor Anna Zeide. In December 2020, Virginia Tech acquired the "website and accompanying physical library" and planned to "carry on Olver's legacy and create space for new research and student internship opportunities".

=== Adaptations ===
The Food Timeline was adapted in 2024 by The Secret Ingredient, a culinary culture newsletter. The adapted article includes illustrations and archival visual media.

== Audio interviews ==
- Zuraw, Lydia (May 26, 2013). "Picnicking Through The Ages". The Salt. NPR.
- Pelaccio, Linda (May 9, 2013). "Lynne Olver & FoodTimeline.org". A Taste of the Past. Episode 135. Heritage Radio Network.
- Pascal, Mark; Schott, Francis (May 15, 2007). "Lynne Olver / The Food Timeline". The Restaurant Guys (Podcast).
- Folse, John (January 25, 2005). "Lynne Olver Interview". Stirrin' It Up (Podcast).

=== Audio biography ===
- Lancaster, Bridget (April 29, 2021). "The Curious Curator of Culinary History". Proof (Podcast) (mp3). Season 7. Episode 2. America's Test Kitchen.
