= Arròs a banda =

Spanish dish of rice cooked in fish stock

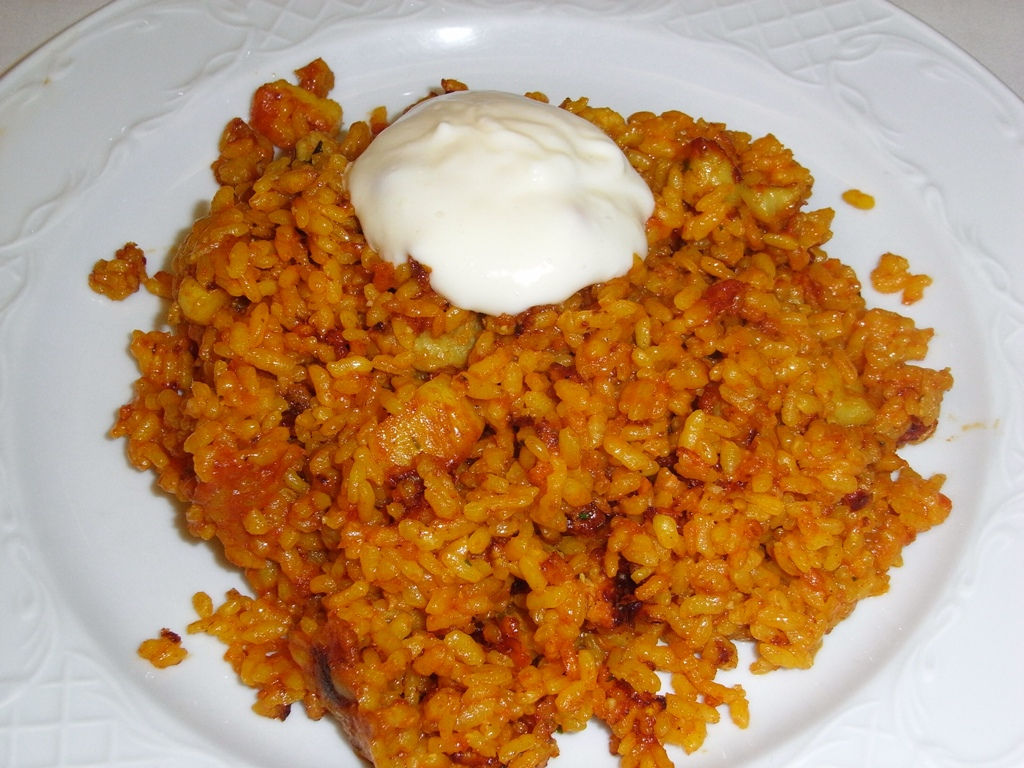
Arròs a banda with aioli.

Arròs a banda (Catalan "rice on the side"; Spanish arroz a banda) is a dish of rice cooked in fish stock, typical of the coastal area of Alicante (and, per extension, most of the Valencian Community) in Spain and distinct from the paella of Valencia. It is popular as far as Garraf in the province of Barcelona (Catalonia) and down to Murcia (Region of Murcia).

It originated with the fishermen of Alicante, who sold off their best fish and kept the leftovers for stock, in which rice was cooked. It is usually served with alioli.

== Preparation ==
The basic recipe consists of cooking rice in a broth made from cheap fish with many bones, called morralla (Catalan for 'whitebait'), that had little value in the market and constituted the livelihood of the poor fishermen who reserved the best pieces for sale. Little by little, it was elaborated with seafood broths and the most select fish.

Arròs a banda is typically served together with caldero marinero. The latter is prepared by creating a sofrito containing garlic, ñora peppers, and fish heads, to which water, potatoes, and occasionally other vegetables (such as cabbage and tomatoes) are added. The resulting simple stew is served in a soup plate accompanied by alioli. Then rice is mixed with the remaining broth to create a paella-like dish which is served separately, hence the name arròs a banda or "rice on the side". In this way, the fishermen were able to produce two dishes from a single preparation. The aioli is a fundamental accompaniment to these dishes, as it provided the humble people of the sea with calories that they could not obtain in any other way.

A similar rice dish, arròs del senyoret, is also made with fish broth but unlike arròs a banda it contains peeled prawns, grouper or chopped squid. The name senyoret (Catalan for 'young gentleman') refers to the fact that, because all seafood in the dish is cleaned before cooking, it can be eaten directly without peeling or cutting. These two rice dishes should not be confused.

In the Murcia Region, arròs del senyoret is called "arroz a banda" and is also eaten directly without having to peel the chunks, whereas arròs a banda as described here is called arroz caldero (Spanish for 'cauldron'), caldero murciano, caldero Cartagena, or caldero del Mar Menor.
