= Anna Zeide =

American academic and author

- Born: 1984 (age 41–42)
- Education: Washington University in St. Louis (BA, MA); University of Wisconsin-Madison (PhD)
- Known for: Food history
- Awards: James Beard Foundation Award (2019)
- Scientific career
- Fields: History
- Workplaces: Oklahoma State University; Virginia Tech
- Thesis: In Cans We Trust: Food, Consumers, and Scientific Expertise in Twentieth-Century America (2014)
- Doctoral advisor: Gregg Mitman
- Website: annazeide.org

Anna Zeide is an American professor of history at Virginia Tech and an author who was written about food, consumerism, and food systems. She wrote Canned: The Rise and Fall of Consumer Confidence in the American Food Industry. She previously worked at Oklahoma State University.

== Early life and education ==
Zeide was born on April 23, 1984, and raised in a rural and forested region of Arkansas. Her family were the only Jews in their town. The nearest synagogue was over two hours away in Little Rock, Arkansas. Zeide's father was a Russian-Jewish immigrant. She received a bachelor's degree and master's degree from Washington University in St. Louis and Doctor of Philosophy in History of Science, Medicine, and Technology from the University of Wisconsin–Madison.

== Career ==
After receiving her doctorate in 2014, Zeide became an assistant professor of history at Oklahoma State University and wrote on food, consumerism, and food systems. She won a James Beard Award in the Reference, History, and Scholarship category for Canned: The Rise and Fall of Consumer Confidence in the American Food Industry. Zeide and her work has been featured on WORT, KPFA, BYU Radio, WYPR, KERA, and the New Books Network, and in the Review of Agricultural, Food and Environmental Studies, Stillwater News-Press and The O'Colly. Her work about botulism has been published in the Saturday Evening Post and Smithsonian.

In 2020, Zeide left Oklahoma to become an associate professor of history at Virginia Tech and the founding director of their Food Studies Program.

== Selected works ==
- Canned: The Rise and Fall of Consumer Confidence in the American Food Industry. Berkeley: University of California Press (2019). ISBN 9780520322769
- US History in 15 Foods. Bloomsbury Academic (2023). ISBN 9781350211971
