= Chocolate ice cream =

Dessert

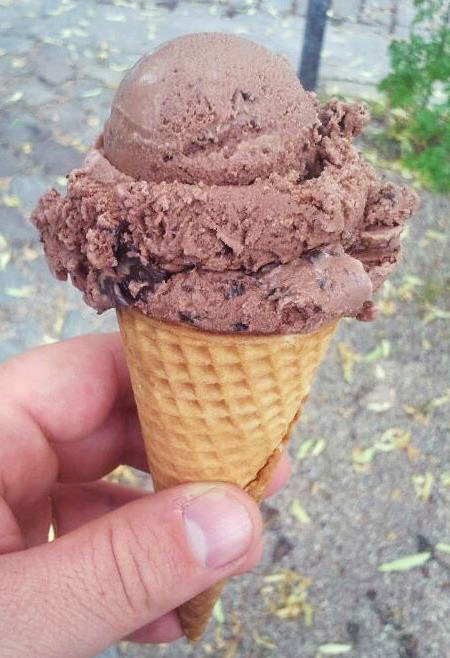
- Chocolate ice cream in a cone
- Alternative names: Antonio Latini
- Type: Ice cream
- Place of origin: Italy
- Region or state: Worldwide
- Main ingredients: Cocoa powder, eggs, cream, vanilla, sugar

Chocolate ice cream is ice cream with natural or artificial chocolate flavoring. It is one of the oldest flavors of ice cream, and also one of the world's most popular. While most often sold alone, it is also a base for many other flavors.

Ice creams, chocolate
Nutritional value per 100 g (3.5 oz)
- Energy: 2,680 kJ (640 kcal)
- Carbohydrates: 28.2 g
- Sugars: 25.4 g
- Dietary fiber: 1.2 g
- Fat: 11 g
- Protein: 3.8 g
- Other constituents: Quantity
- Water: 55.7 g
- Caffeine: 3 mg
- Theobromine: 62 mg
- Link to USDA Database entry
- ^{†}Percentages estimated using US recommendations for adults.

== History ==
The earliest frozen chocolate recipes were published in Naples, Italy, in 1693 in Antonio Latini's The Modern Steward. Chocolate was one of the first ice cream flavors, created before vanilla, common drinks such as hot chocolate, coffee, and tea were the first food items to be turned into frozen desserts. Hot chocolate had become a popular drink in seventeenth-century Europe, alongside coffee and tea, and all three beverages were used to make frozen and unfrozen desserts. Latini produced two recipes for ices based on the drink, both of which contained only chocolate and sugar. In 1775, Italian doctor Filippo Baldini wrote a treatise entitled De sorbetti, in which he recommended chocolate ice cream as a remedy for various medical conditions, including gout and scurvy.

Chocolate ice cream became popular in the United States in the late nineteenth century. The first advertisement for ice cream in America started in New York on May 12, 1777, when Philip Lenzi announced that ice cream was officially available "almost every day". Until 1800, ice cream was a rare and exotic dessert enjoyed mostly by the elite. Around 1800 insulated ice houses were invented and manufacturing ice cream soon became an industry in America.

== Production ==
Chocolate ice cream is generally made by blending cocoa powder, and the eggs, cream, vanilla, and sugar used to make vanilla ice cream. Sometimes chocolate liquor is used in addition to cocoa powder or used exclusively to create the chocolate flavor. Cocoa powder gives chocolate ice cream its brown color, and it is uncommon to add other colorings.

The Codex Alimentarius, which provides an international set of standards for food, states that the flavor in chocolate ice cream must come from nonfat cocoa solids that must comprise at least 2.0–2.5% of the mix weight. The US Code of Federal Regulations "permits reductions in the content of milk fat and total milk solids by a factor of 2.5 times the weight of the cocoa solids", to take into account the use of additional sweeteners.

The minimum fat content of chocolate ice cream in both Canada and the United States is 8%, irrespective of the amount of chocolate sweetener in the recipe.

== Availability ==
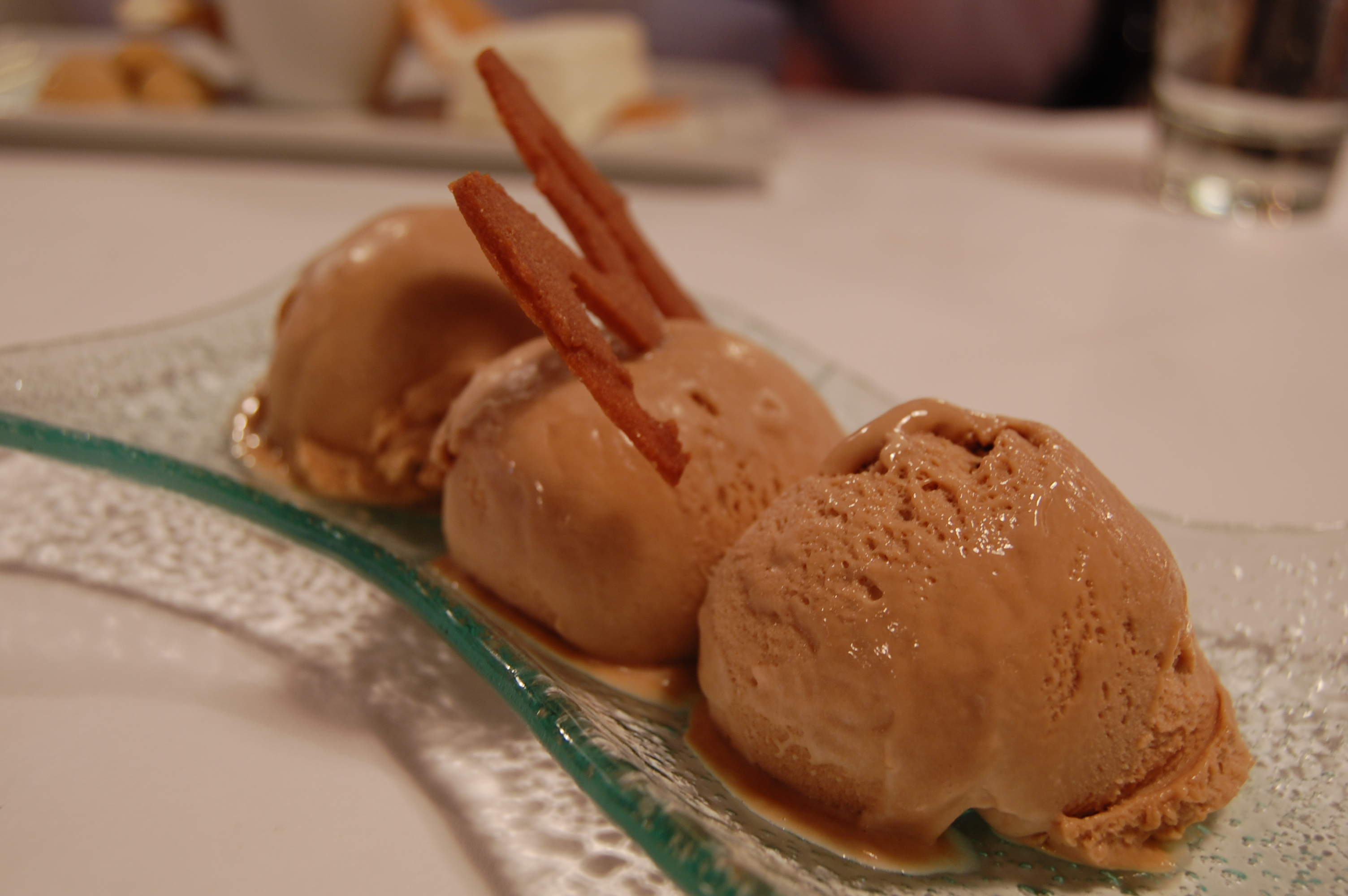
Scoops of chocolate malt ice cream

Chocolate ice cream is sold in restaurants, cafés, diners, supermarkets, grocery and convenience stores. Ice cream parlors specialize in the sale of ice cream. Chocolate is one of the five most popular ice cream flavors in the United States and as of 2013 is second only to vanilla.

== Other flavors ==
Chocolate ice cream is used in the creation of other flavors, such as rocky road. Other flavors of ice cream contain chocolate chips mixed in with the ice cream. For example, (plain) chocolate chip ice cream is made with vanilla ice cream, chocolate chocolate chip (or double chocolate chip) ice cream is made with chocolate ice cream, and mint chocolate chip ice cream is made with mint ice cream.

== See also ==
- Cookies and cream
- List of ice cream flavors
- Strawberry ice cream
- Neapolitan ice cream
- Vanilla ice cream
- Rocky Road ice cream
