= Vanilla ice cream =

Ice cream flavor

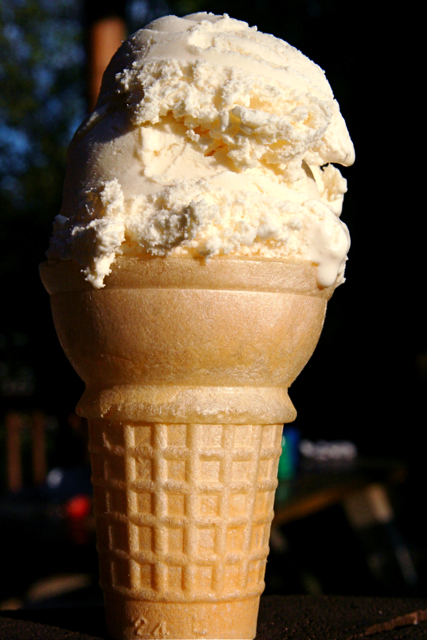
Vanilla ice cream served in a wafer ice cream cone

Vanilla ice cream is a dessert flavoured with vanilla beans, vanilla extract, or synthetic vanillin that is especially common in North America, Asia, and Europe. The type of vanilla used varies by location: in North America and Europe for instance, prominent, smoky flavors are more common, while in Ireland, an anise-like flavor is more frequently used. Many people consider vanilla to be the "default" flavor of ice cream (see "plain vanilla"), although plain ice cream without any flavouring is also available.

Vanilla ice cream may be flavoured with vanillin or with vanilla extract. Vanilla extract contains almost 200 compounds with varying properties such as fat and water-solubility, permitting ice cream variations (e.g., low-fat, fat modified) not possible with vanilla ice cream made simply with vanillin. In the US, ice cream flavoured with natural vanilla extract may be called "vanilla ice cream", ice cream flavoured with vanillin extract from natural vanilla may be called "vanilla flavored ice cream", and ice cream flavoured with synthetic vanillin must be labelled "artifically flavored vanilla ice-cream".

The United States Food and Drug Administration characterizes vanilla ice cream into three categories: (1) the ice cream only contains vanilla extract; (2) the ice cream contains 1 ounce (28 g) of synthetic vanillin per gallon (3.8 L) of one-fold vanilla extract; (3) the ice cream only contains synthetic ingredients.

== History ==
The Totonac people of Mexico were the first to cultivate vanilla beans, doing so in the 12th century.

Vanilla began to be used as a flavouring for ice cream in France from the 18th century. Like all ice creams, vanilla ice creams did not include egg yolks until the middle of the century. The addition was soon replicated in England.

During the 1780s, Thomas Jefferson recorded a recipe for vanilla ice cream, the first such recipe recorded by an American. Jefferson did not record the creator of the recipe. A similar recipe recorded by Virginia Jefferson Randolph Trist, his granddaughter, is attributed to "Petit" (possibly referring to Adrien Petit, a butler in Jefferson's household). Food historian Michael Twitty suggests that James Hemings, an enslaved man who worked as a chef in Monticello, created the recipe. The ice cream recipe shares similarities with the recipe for snow eggs, a French dessert introduced to the United States by Hemings. During his presidency, Jefferson served ice cream at the White House, which helped to popularize the dessert in the United States. The recipe is currently housed at the Library of Congress.

== See also ==
- List of ice cream flavors
- History of ice cream
- History of vanilla
