= Bolo de bolacha =

Portuguese no-bake biscuit cake

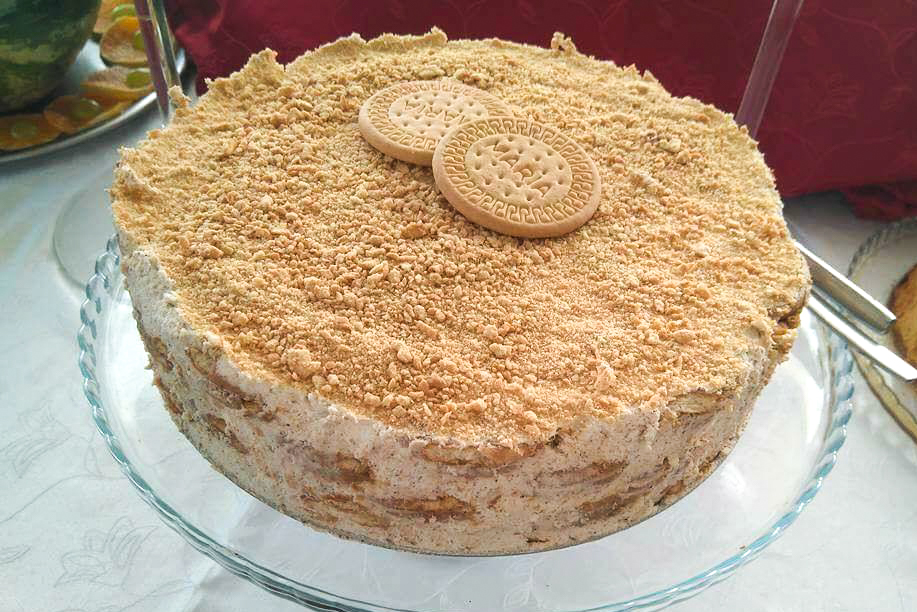
- Garnished with crushed and whole biscuits
- Type: Dessert
- Place of origin: Portugal
- Main ingredients: Marie biscuits, egg yolks, brown sugar, butter, coffee (or espresso)
- Similar dishes: Vínarterta, icebox cake, kek batik, mango float, trifle

Bolo de bolacha (lit. 'biscuit cake') is a Portuguese dessert made with Marie biscuits lightly soaked in coffee and layered with buttercream.

== Background ==
Marie biscuits (Portuguese: bolacha Maria) are popular biscuits introduced to the Iberian Peninsula in the late 1800s. They often accompany coffee or tea for dipping.

The first published recipe for bolo de bolacha first appears in 1959, in the third edition of O Mestre Cozinheiro, a cookbook by Laura Santos and published by Editorial Lavores. However, it may have been inspired by an earlier recipe known a few years earlier in France known as gâteau de famille which was made with thé brun biscuits. Other than being coated with powdered or shaved chocolate, the recipes were nearly identical.

Nevertheless, its composition is similar to other desserts found throughout Europe such as Italian tiramisu or English trifle found today. It reached as far as Goa in Portuguese India, although the dessert is often made without eggs.

== Preparation ==
A frosting (and filling) is made by whipping butter, white sugar, and egg yolks similar to French buttercream. A little coffee is often added to this mixture. There are alternate recipes where buttercream is sometimes substituted with whipped cream or stabilized with gelatin, or condensed milk.

The biscuits used for a layer are briefly soaked in strong coffee or espresso and arranged in a dish or pan. It is then applied with thin layer of buttercream. Then next layers of biscuit and buttercream are repeated until reaching the desired height. The sides are also frosted and sometimes coated with biscuit crumbs then chilled for it to set. In Brazil, it is sometimes coated with a chocolate brigadeiro-like ganache.

== See also ==
- Salame de chocolate, often made with Marie biscuits
- Portuguese Cuisine
