= Tiffin (confectionery) =

"Fridge cake" of crushed biscuits

- Alternative names: Fridge cake
- Type: Confectionery
- Place of origin: United Kingdom
- Main ingredients: Biscuits (usually digestive biscuits), sugar, syrup, raisins, cocoa powder

Tiffin is a form of cake-like confection composed of crushed biscuits (most commonly digestive biscuits), sugar, syrup, raisins, chocolate and cocoa powder, often covered with a layer of melted striped chocolate. Unlike regular cakes, tiffin does not require baking. Instead, following preparation of the mixture, the confection is chilled until set. As a consequence the product may also be known as "fridge cake" or another similar term.

== Products ==
The confectioner Cadbury produces a chocolate bar called Tiffin as part of its Dairy Milk range; it consists of biscuit pieces and raisins in chocolate.

== See also ==
- Batik cake
- Hedgehog slice
- Icebox cake
- Rocky road
- Tinginys
- Lolly cake
