= Biscuit cake =

No bake cake

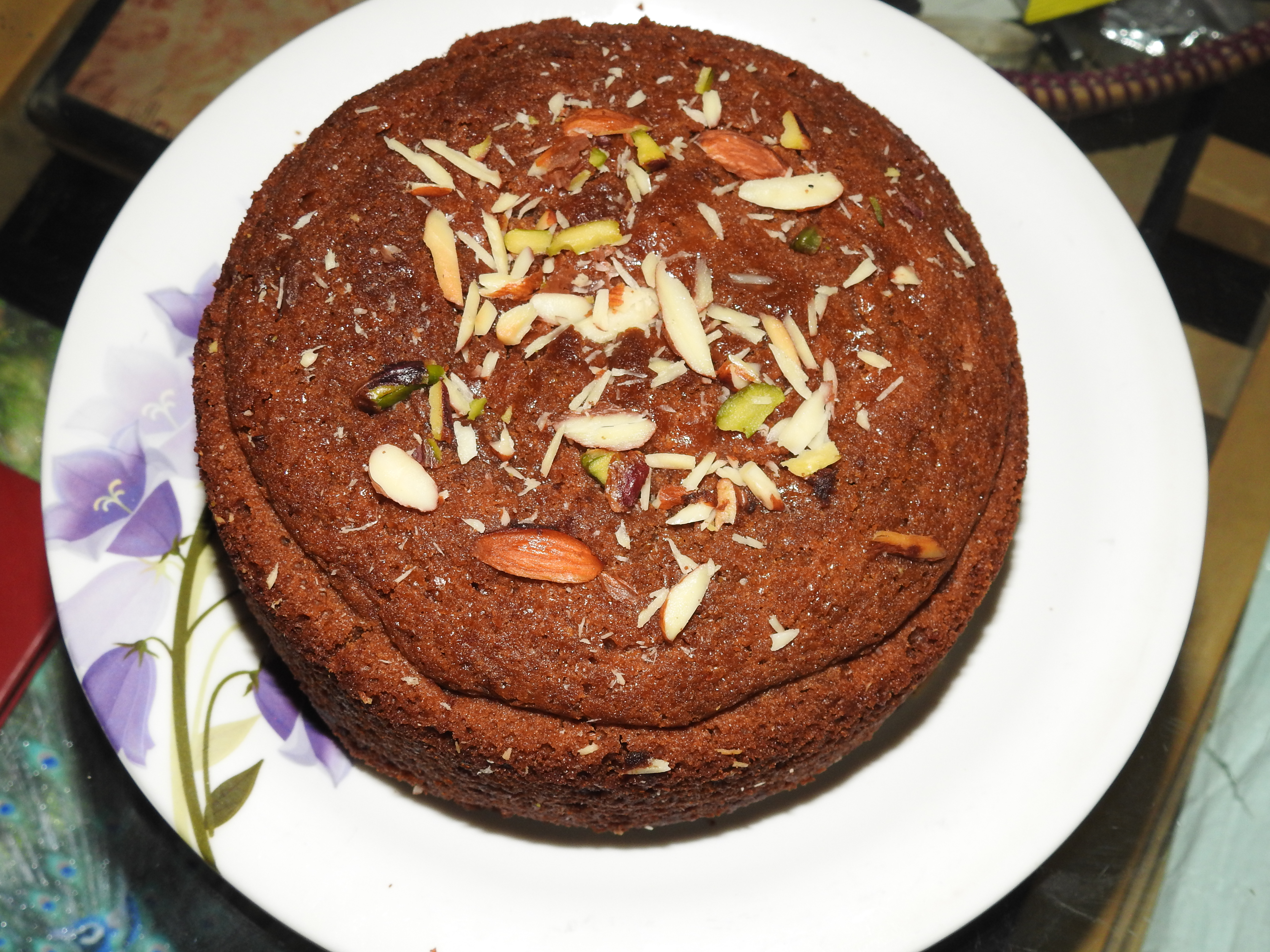
Biscuit cake

Biscuit cake is a type of no bake tea cake, similar to American icebox cake, found in Irish, English, Danish, Arabic (Especially Tunisian cuisine known as "Khobzet Hwe"), Bulgarian and Jewish cuisine. It is made with digestive biscuits and is optionally prepared with a chocolate glaze.

== Variations ==
=== Jewish cuisine ===
In Jewish cuisine, this traditional style cake was prepared in a pyramid shape. It included vanilla pudding and sweetened dark chocolate frosting. It can be prepared as a sheet cake with cream, strawberries and Jell-O.

=== United Kingdom ===
Molded in a terrine or loaf pan, the batter is prepared by simmering water with butter, sugar, chocolate chips, and cocoa until a smooth mixture is obtained. After the mixture has cooled, the crumbled digestive biscuits are incorporated into the batter. It is left to set in the refrigerator, similar to other no-bake cakes. Some versions include condensed milk or raw eggs.

The chocolate biscuit cake was reportedly a favourite tea cake of Queen Elizabeth II and Prince William. Prince William requested that the cake be prepared as a groom's cake for his wedding.

Some versions of the cake are made with golden syrup. To prepare this cake, butter, chocolate, and golden syrup are heated. Beaten egg may optionally be whisked into the mixture while it is still warm. Crumbled biscuits and optional dry ingredients like glacé cherries, walnuts, almonds, sultanas, dried apricots are incorporated in the batter. It may be decorated with different toppings like brazil nuts or marshmallows.

== See also ==
- Batik cake
- Tinginys
- Chocolate biscuit pudding
- Hedgehog slice
- Mango float
