= Rocky Road =

Rocky Road may refer to:

== Food ==
- Rocky road (dessert), a dessert made from chocolate, marshmallows, and nuts
- Rocky road (ice cream), an ice cream flavor that contains marshmallows and nuts, named after the dessert
- Rocky Road Cereal, a former American breakfast cereal of the 1980s
- Rocky Road, slang for Egg in the basket
- Rocky Road candy bar, manufactured by the Annabelle Candy Company

== Entertainment ==
- Rocky Road (TV series), an American sitcom that aired from 1985–1987
- The Rocky Road (film), a 1910 film directed by D. W. Griffith
- Rocky Road Records, a record label
- "Rocky Road" (Once Upon a Time), the third episode from the fourth season of the fairy tale drama Once Upon a Time
- "Rocky Road" (song), by Moneybagg Yo and Kodak Black
- "Rocky Road", a song by Peter, Paul and Mary from their 1963 album In the Wind
- Rocky Road, a 2014 TV movie starring Mark Salling
- The Rocky Road (album), a 2008 album by Damien Dempsey

== Literature ==
- Rocky Road, a 2005 book in the Undercover Brothers series
