= Serradura =

Portuguese dessert

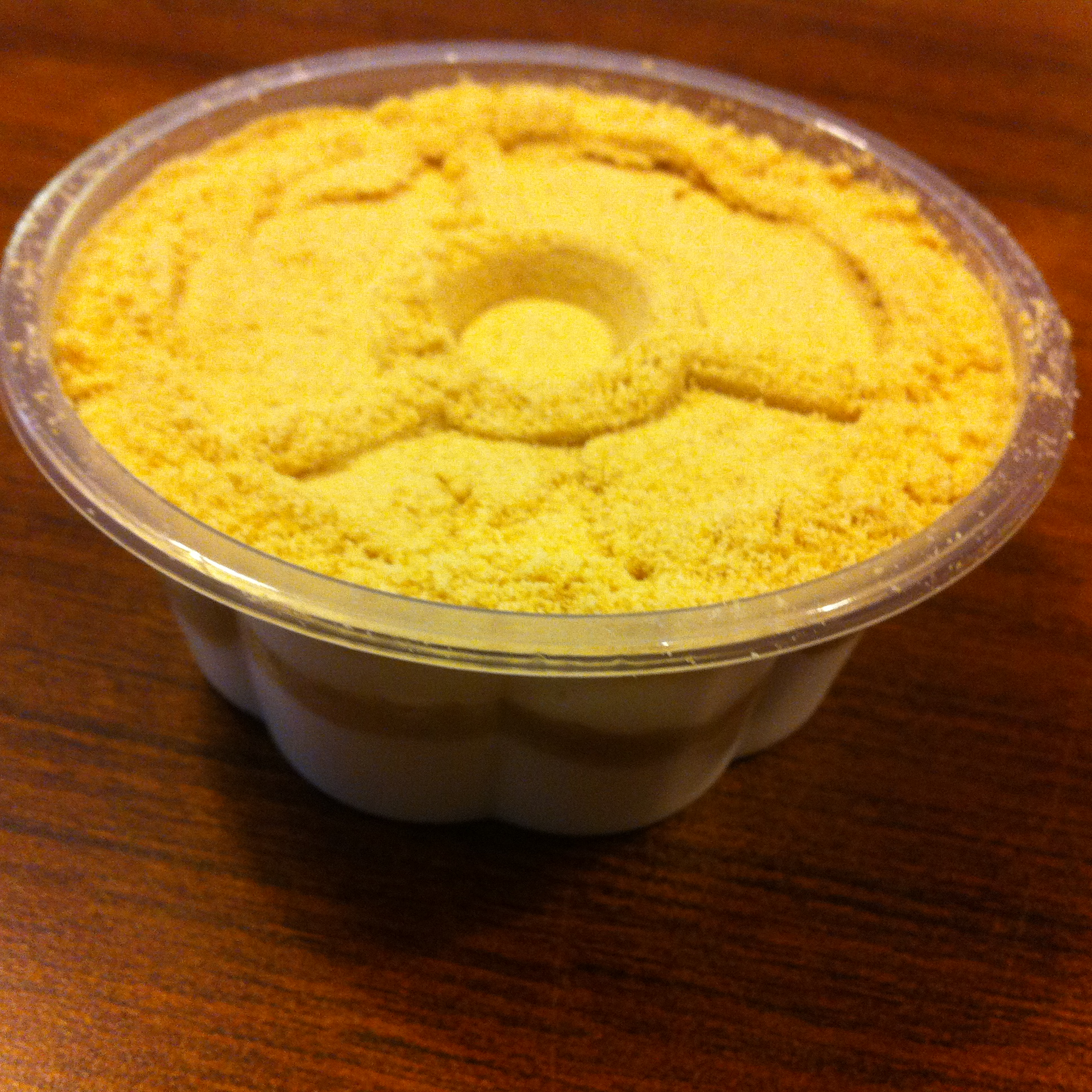
- Alternative names: Sawdust pudding, Macau pudding
- Type: Pudding
- Course: Dessert
- Place of origin: Portugal
- Associated cuisine: Portuguese cuisine, Macanese cuisine
- Serving temperature: Cold
- Main ingredients: Whipped cream, condensed milk, Marie biscuit, vanilla extract

Serradura (Portuguese pronunciation: [sɐʁɐˈduɾɐ]), also known as sawdust pudding or Macau pudding, is a Portuguese dessert with a layered appearance alternating between whipped cream and crumbled Marie biscuit. The name serradura is Portuguese for "sawdust", which refers to the appearance of the finely crushed biscuit crumbs in the pudding. The dessert is popular in Portugal and its former colonies – Macau in China, and Goa in India.

Serradura

Chinese name
- Chinese: 1. 木糠布丁; 2. 木糠布甸
- Literal meaning: Sawdust pudding
Transcriptions
Standard Mandarin
- Hanyu Pinyin: Mùkāng bùdīng
Yue: Cantonese
- Jyutping: muk hong bo ding
- IPA: muk9 hɔŋ1 bou3 diŋ1

Portuguese name
- Portuguese: Serradura

== Origin and history ==
Serradura is a dessert originated in Portugal, which became famous in Macau. It is a very common dessert that can be easily found in different restaurants and bakeries in Macau, which is why serradura is chosen as one of the must-try foods of Macau.

Serradura was introduced to Macau during a time when Macau was under the colonial rule of Portugal. It can also be found in Hong Kong, in Goa, India (former Portuguese colony), and various Portuguese and Spanish-speaking countries.

== Varieties ==
=== Flavours ===
Traditionally, serradura was in the flavour of tea biscuits, also known as Marie biscuits, and whipped cream. Later on, it has been developed into many different flavours, including Oreo, coffee beans, nuts, green tea, and so on, by varying on the cream or the biscuits crumbs. For the sawdust, some recipes use biscuits or powder to mix with Marie biscuits or even replace it. As for the variation on the cream, some recipes may add different flavourings to the cream to create other taste such as chocolate, strawberry, green tea etc.

=== Form ===
In terms of the form that serradura is served, it usually comes in two types, cake or pudding. The cake type serradura is frozen into a harder state so that the texture of it is a bit like ice cream. For the pudding style, it is also frozen but with a higher temperature, so that the cream solidify to a lower level to create a creamy texture.

== Recipe ==
Serradura is quite easy to make, and only a few ingredients are needed. Condensed milk, Marie biscuit crumbs and whipping cream are the most common ingredients of serradura, but sometimes thick cream would be used to replace whipping cream. Spread the whisked cream and the biscuits crumbs into a container alternately, after condensation in fridge for five to six hours, the dessert can be served.

As serradura is more common and popular nowadays, people started to create new flavors, like green tea, chocolate, coffee and Oreo flavours. To add different flavors into serradura, green tea powder, vanilla extract or any other flavours can be added into the cream. Then, whisk them together. Another way to make some changes according to individual preferences is to replace the Marie biscuits with other biscuits, such as Oreo.

== Famous Shops ==
=== In Macau ===
==== Serrdura ====
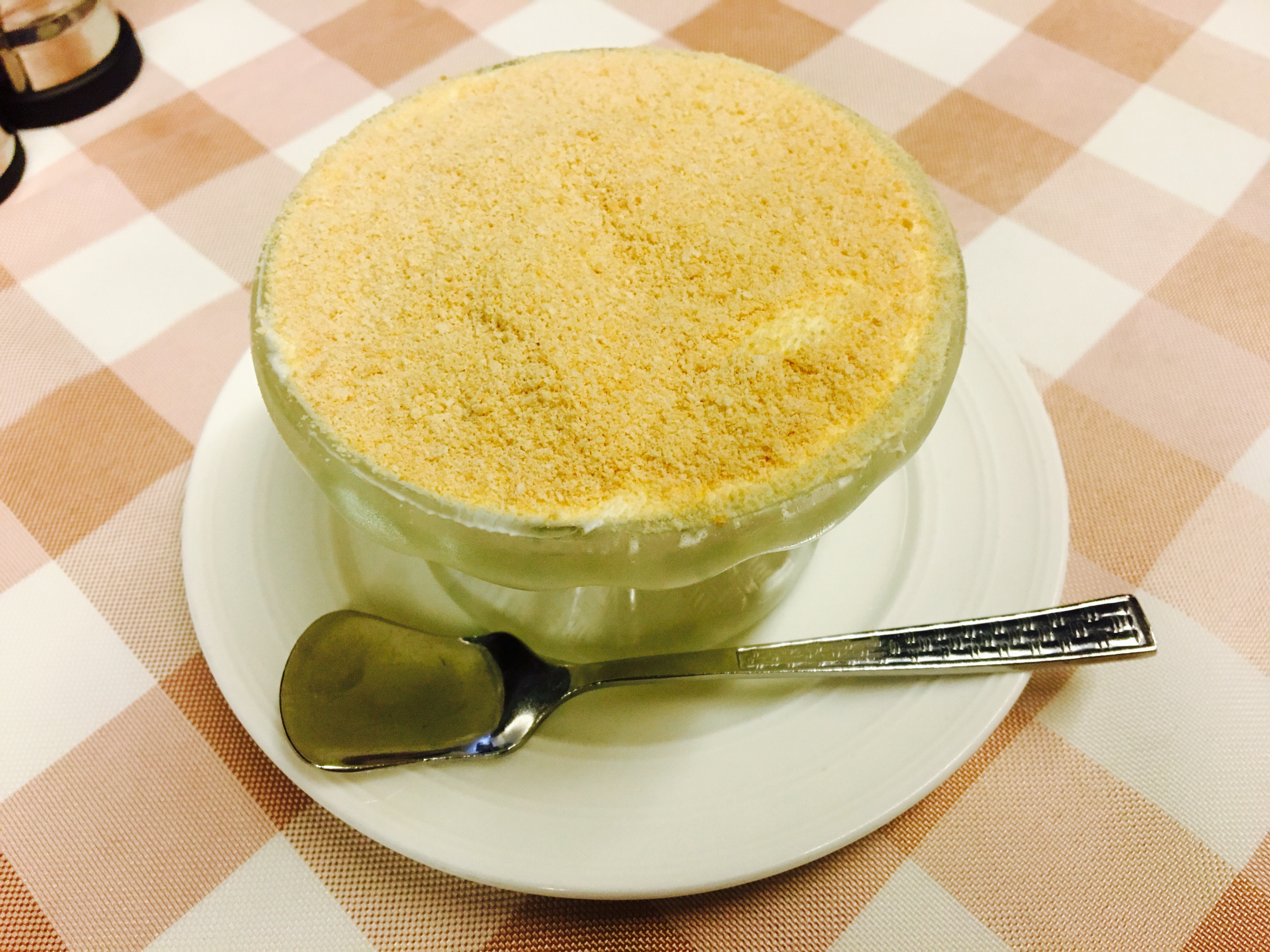
Serradura in a Portuguese restaurant in Macau

Serrdura is a Macau chain store selling cakes, sorbets, and serradura. The first retail store opened in May 2003. Currently, there are 3 branches in Macau. The store name Serrdura originated from the name of the Portuguese dessert, serradura. Serradura is the signature dish of the store. The flavours of serradura provided in the store include original, cookie, mango, durian, coffee, mango green tea, rocky road, and chocolate flavours.

==== Gelatina Mok Yi Kei ====
Gelatina Mok Yi Kei is a dessert store that has operated for over 80 years. It was a roadside food stand selling toast at first. Now, it is located on the Cunha street in Vila da Taipa. The store is well known for durian ice cream and serradura. It also sells puddings, jellies, and mango pomelo sago.

=== In Hong Kong ===
==== LIS Café ====
LIS Café is a restaurant offering both Asian and Western dishes. It is located in the L’hotel Island South, a hotel in Aberdeen of Hong Kong. Serradura is one of the signature dishes of the café. It was described as “the best interpretation of serradura ever” by the HK Magazine on Oct 25, 2011.
