= Zebra cake =

Zebra cake can refer to one of the following:

- Icebox cake
- A marble cake in a zebra-striped pattern
- A pre-packaged cake with zebra-striped frosting manufactured by the Little Debbie brand of McKee Foods
