= Batik cake =

Malaysian dessert

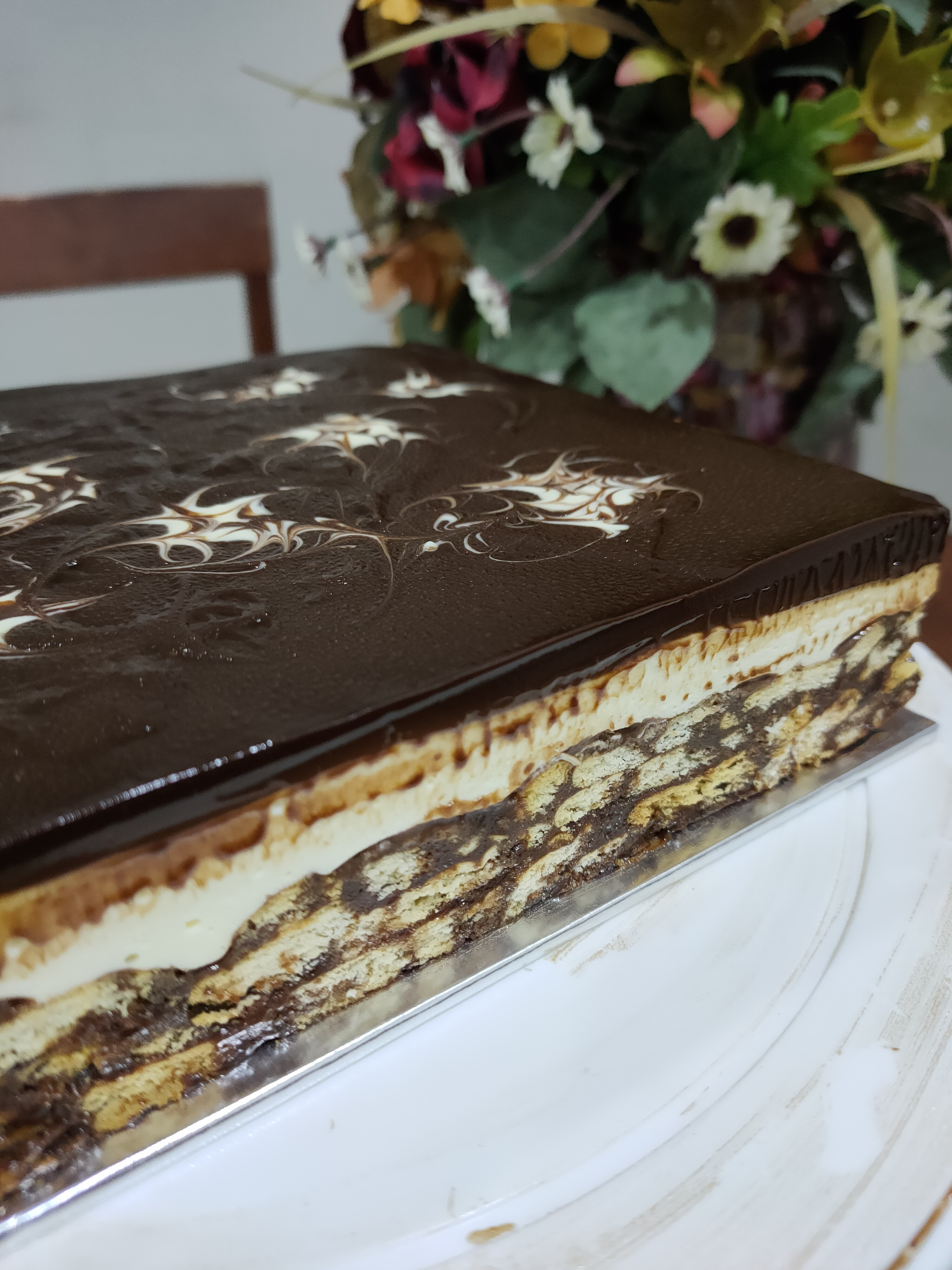
- A chocolate indulgence batik cake
- Alternative names: Kek batik, Marie fudge cake
- Place of origin: Malaysia
- Region or state: Southeast Asia
- Associated cuisine: Brunei, Malaysia, Singapore
- Main ingredients: Broken Marie biscuit, Milo powder, cocoa powder, egg, butter/margarine and condensed milk
- Food energy (per serving): 110 kcal (460 kJ)

Kek batik (lit. 'Batik cake') is a type of Malaysian no-bake fridge cake dessert inspired by the Scottish tiffin, brought in the country during the British Malaya and Borneo period, and adapted with Malaysian ingredients. This cake is made by mixing broken Marie biscuits combined with a chocolate sauce or runny custard made with egg, butter/margarine, condensed milk, Milo and cocoa powder. The cake is served during special occasions like the Eid al-Fitr, Christmas and other festivities.

== Origin and background ==
The cake has origins from the early 1900s Scotland; and was initially introduced during British colonial times in Sarawak but gained immense popularity in the neighbouring state of Sabah, becoming an essential dessert for numerous festive celebrations in East Malaysia before spreading to West Malaysia as well as neighbouring Brunei and Singapore. Batik cake gets its name from the pattern of how the cake is cut out, which resembles the motif of batik clothing when the biscuits are broken and mixed with the chocolate mixture, subsequently forming a unique and irregular alternating abstract pattern when cut. It is one of the very few Malaysian desserts that does not use any tropical ingredients, similar to hedgehog slice and the latest Prince William chocolate biscuit cake, although with some different ingredients. In Brunei, the Batik cake is covered by green colour topping.

== Preparation ==
The cake is made by breaking Marie biscuits into halves or quarters and preparing its chocolate base in a large pot or wok by melting the butter over medium-low heat for 2–3 minutes, followed by the adding of chicken eggs and vanilla extract. The broken biscuits will then be added to the chocolate mixture and continuously stirred until all of the biscuits are coated, then transferred into a prepared pan covered with parchment paper or aluminium foil in the bottom and left to cool at room temperature before being refrigerated for at least 3–4 hours.

== Gallery ==
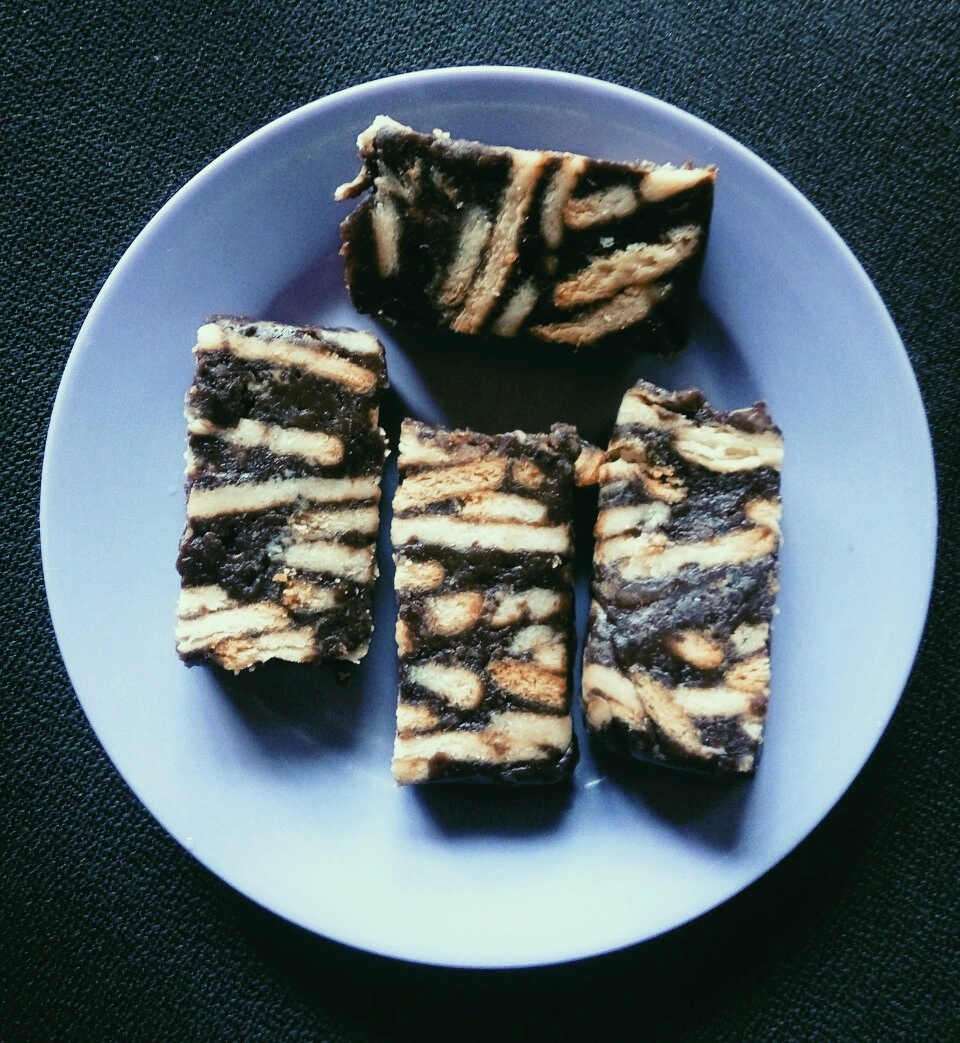
Batik cake cut into several pieces

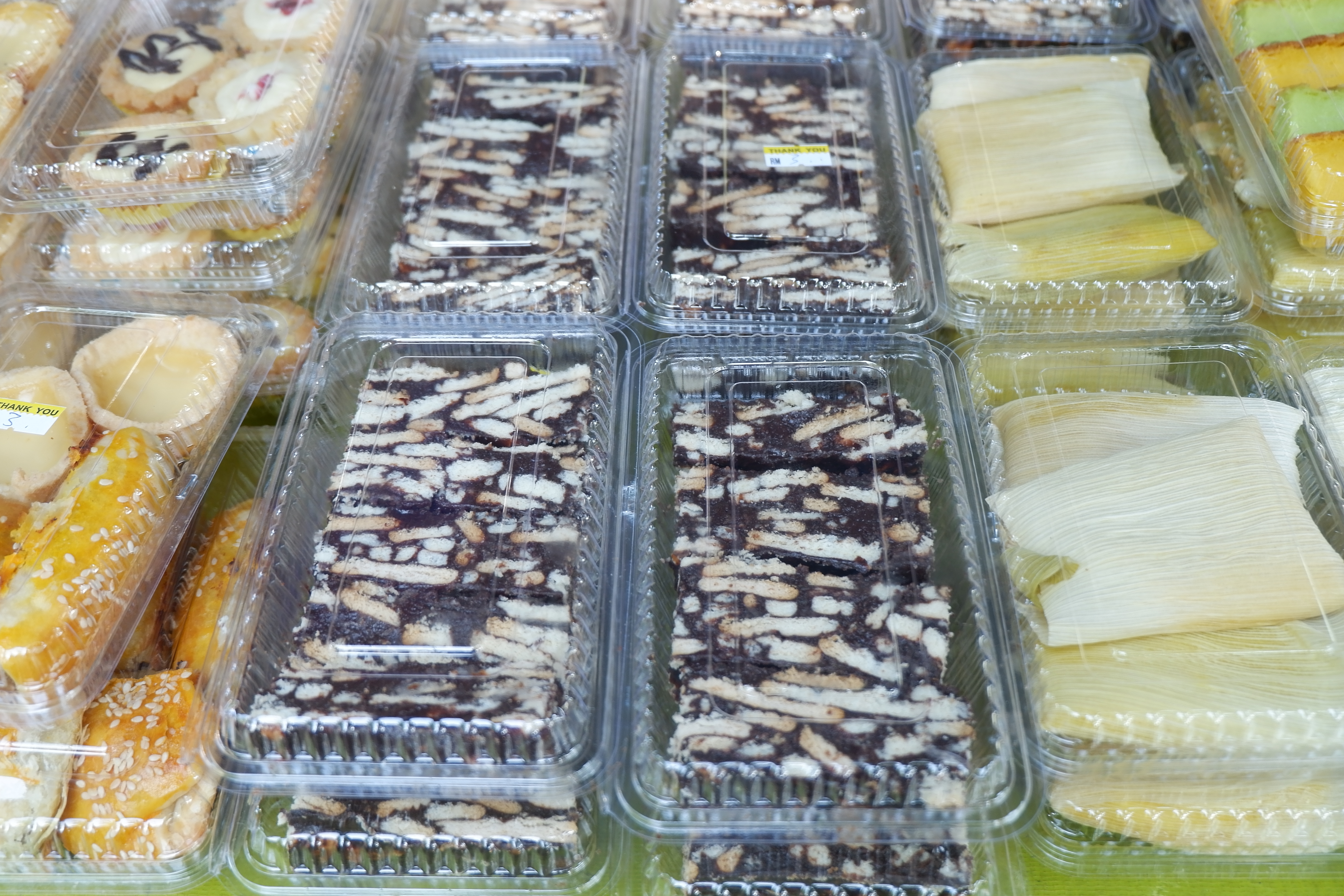
Batik cake sold at the Gaya Street market of Kota Kinabalu District

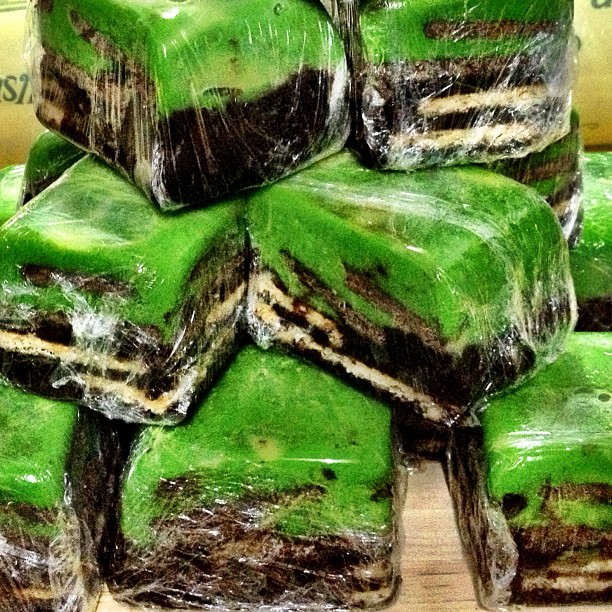
Other variety of Batik cake from Brunei with green topping

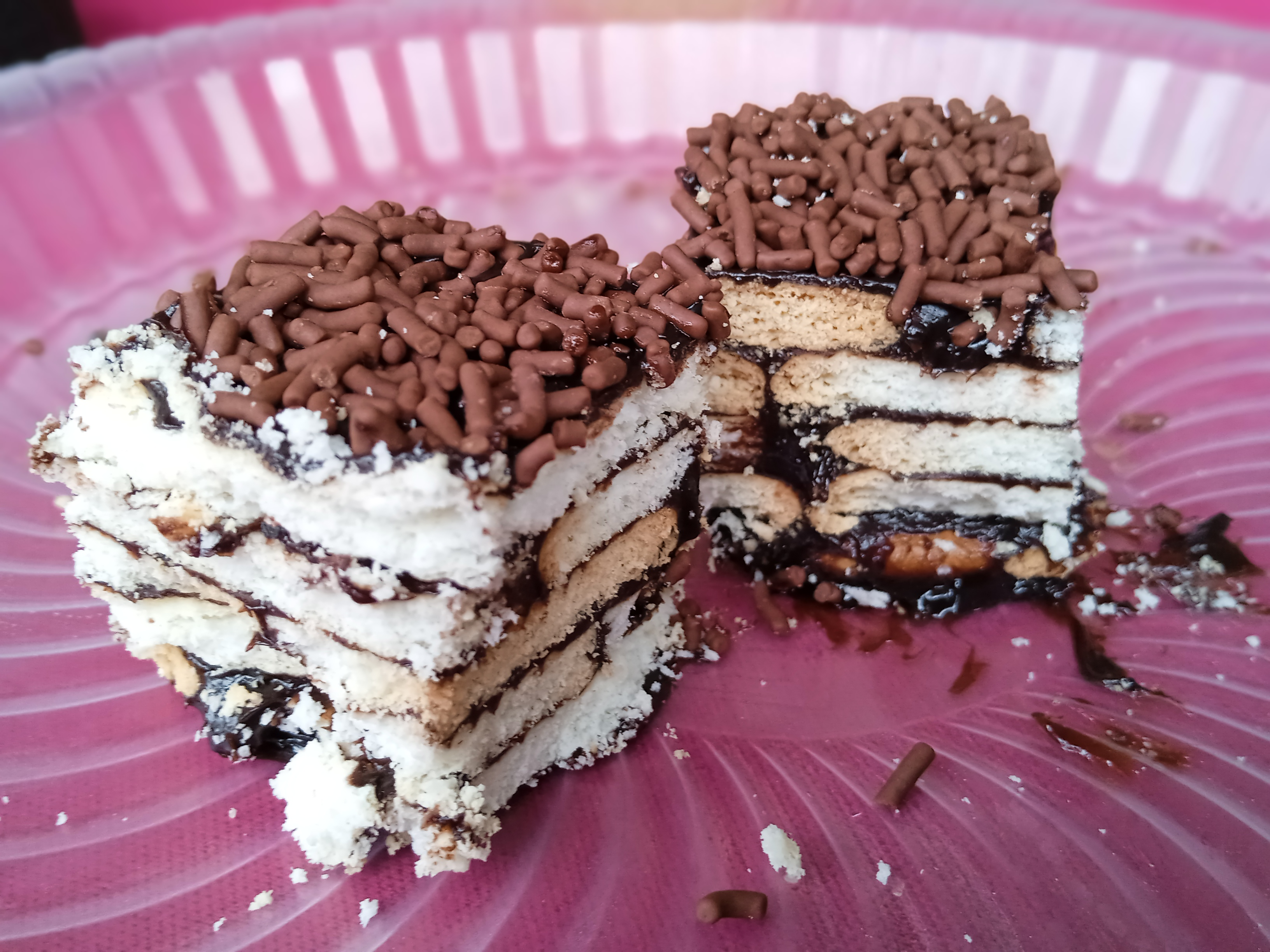
Batik cake with chocolate sprinkles

== See also ==
- Biscuit cake
- Tinginys
- Chocolate biscuit pudding
- Hedgehog slice
- Kiksekage
- Kalte Schnauze
