= Chocolate biscuit pudding =

Sri Lankan dessert

- Type: Pudding
- Place of origin: Sri Lanka
- Serving temperature: Cold
- Main ingredients: Marie biscuits, chocolate pudding or icing

Chocolate biscuit pudding is a Sri Lankan dessert. Chocolate biscuit pudding is made up of alternating layers of milk-dipped Marie biscuits and chocolate pudding or icing. These layers can be seen clearly when cutting through the dish, which is normally served cold. The pudding is often garnished with roasted or chopped nuts, usually cashewnuts.

== Traditional recipe ==
Chocolate biscuit pudding is a dish that was introduced to Sri Lanka during the British Colonial era. The dish has spread to many other countries, including South Africa, with the migration of South Indians.

To make up the pudding, layers of a prepared chocolate pudding/icing mixture are alternated in a serving dish with layers of Marie biscuits dipped in warm milk. Usually, the pudding will consist of five to seven layers in total. This pudding does not require any heating, baking, or steaming.

== Variations ==
Brandy or rum is sometimes added to the chocolate mixture to create a slightly alcoholic version of the dessert.

== See also ==
- Sri Lankan cuisine
- Hedgehog slice
- Batik cake
