= Fentons Creamery =

Historic ice cream parlor and restaurant

Coordinates: 37°49′41″N 122°15′0″W

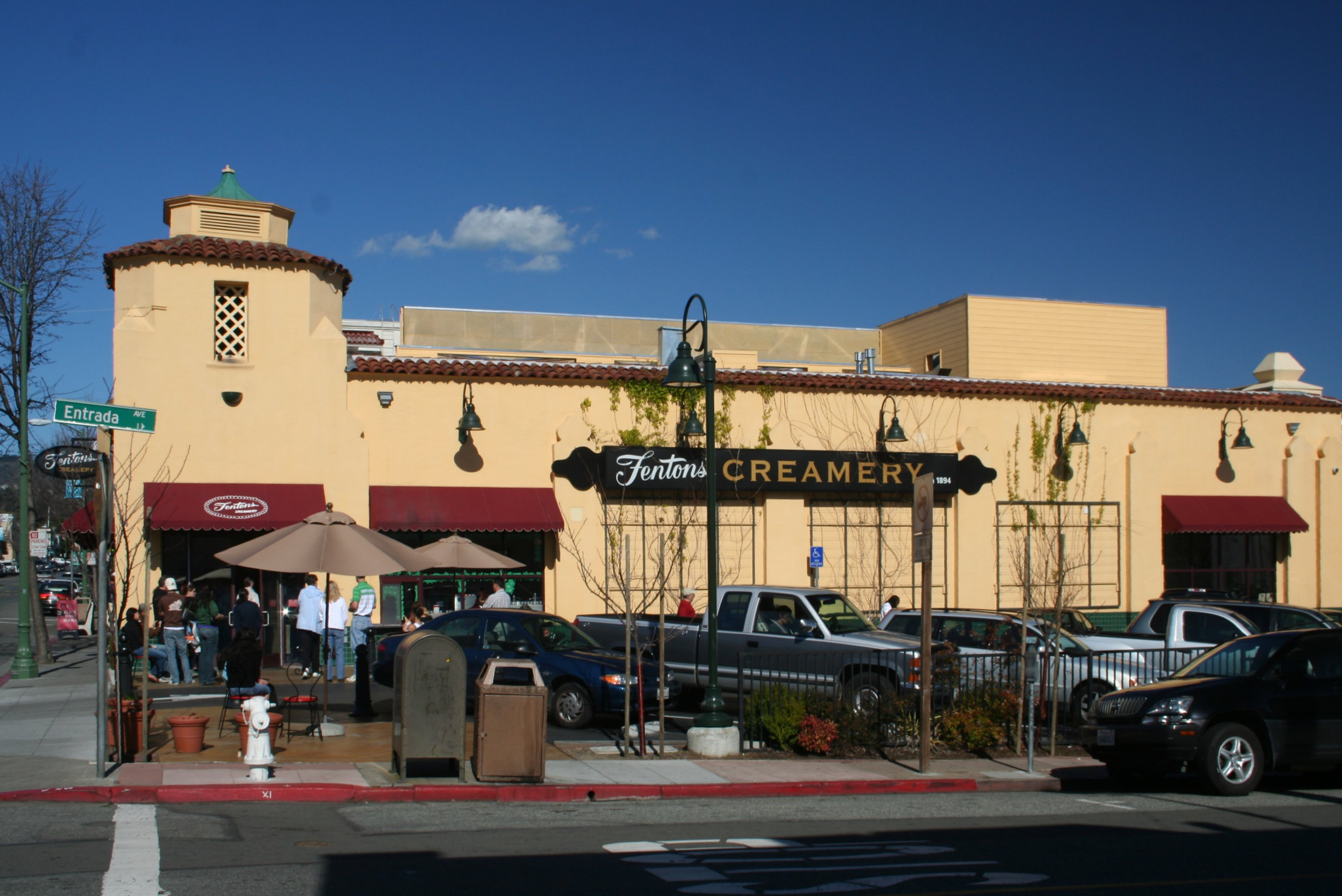
- Oakland Fentons Creamery in 2006
- Interactive map of Fentons Creamery

Restaurant information
- Established: 1894; 132 years ago
- Food type: Ice cream, sandwiches, hamburgers, and salads
- Location: 4226 Piedmont Avenue, Oakland, Alameda County, California, 94611, United States
- Other locations: Vacaville, California
- Website: www.fentonscreamery.com

Fentons Creamery is a historic ice cream parlor and restaurant located on Piedmont Avenue in Oakland, California, United States. Fentons is the state’s longest continually operating creamery, with a small herd of dairy cows in West Marin.

== History ==
Eldridge Seth Fenton opened Fentons Creamery in 1894 on the corner of 41st and Howe streets. The business moved to its present location in 1961, a few blocks away.

In 1894, Eldridge Seth’s grandson, Melvin Fenton, was responsible for creating Rocky Road, as well as Swiss Milk Chocolate and Toasted Almond.

Fentons was then destroyed by an arson fire in 2001. The arsonists claimed the owner of Fentons encouraged them to start the fire. Over $2 million was spent to rebuild it with a grill, more tables, and an expanded menu.

Fentons was featured in the 2009 animated film Up. Director Pete Docter, producer Jonas Rivera, and other Pixar employees are regular customers to Fentons. Docter said that they decided to include it in their movie after the original script had the ice cream parlor named after a different place on the East Coast.

The ice cream parlor also claims to be the original birthplace of rocky road ice cream. Fentons candy maker George Farren made a rocky road candy bar and decided to blend it into an ice cream flavor. This inspired his friends William Dreyer and Joseph Edy of Dreyer's to start making their own version, but substituting almonds for walnuts. However, Dreyer's still continues to market its product as "The Original Rocky Road".

A second location opened in 2007 in Vacaville, California, as well as a shop in the food court of the Oakland International Airport.

== In the news ==
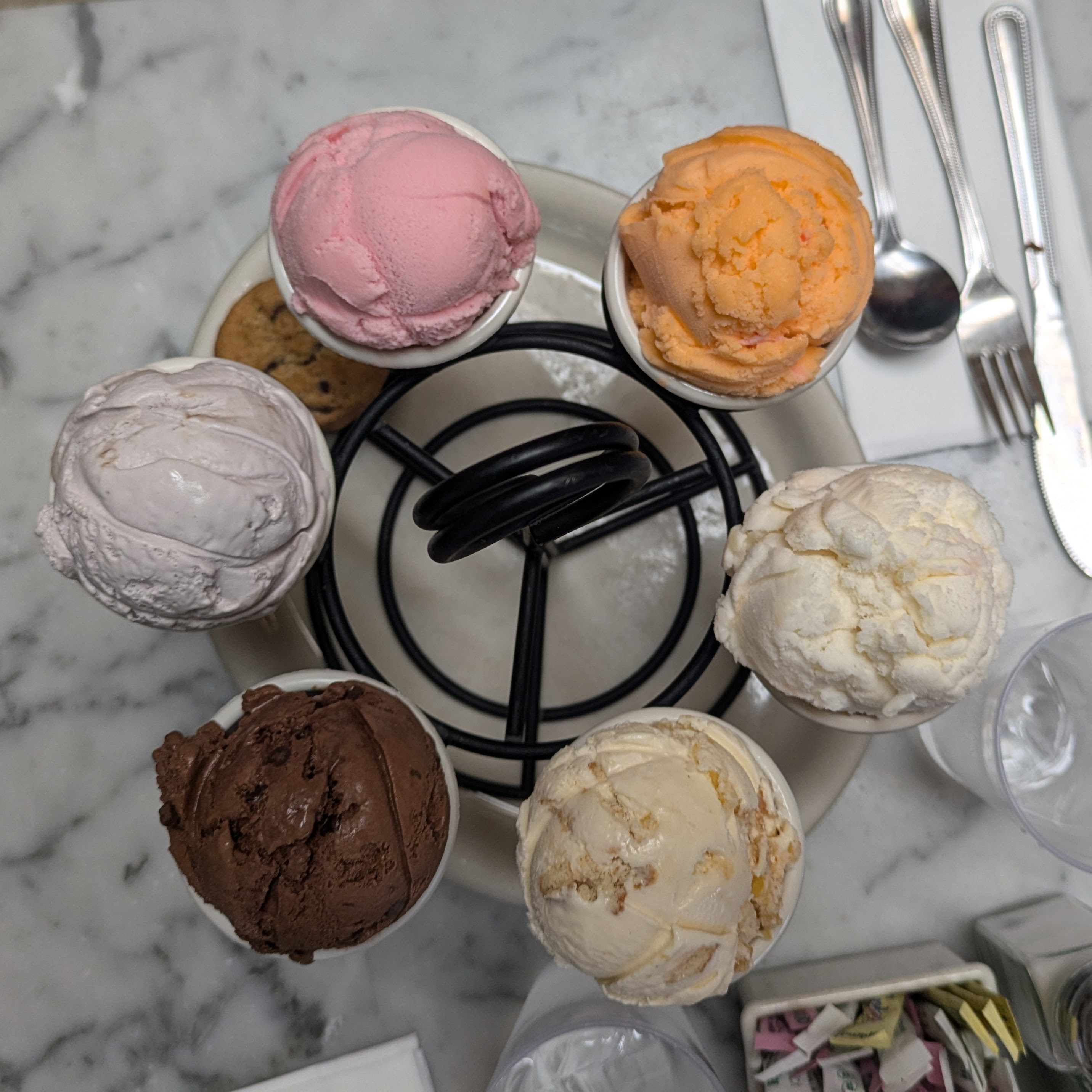
Ice cream and sherbet at Fentons Creamery

In February 2016, to commemorate Super Bowl 50 (played in Santa Clara's Levi's Stadium), Fentons Creamery created the "Cookie Bowl 50", a 10-pound sundae of 12 scoops of vanilla, chocolate and strawberry ice cream, plus boulders of Oreo cookies drenched in hot fudge, pineapple, strawberry, marshmallow, and caramel toppings, whipped cream, Oreo Crumbles and cherries—all served in a bowl made from Oreos.

== Notable awards ==
=== #1 Top Dessert in America ===
The Banana Special was Named the #1 Top Dessert in America by The Food Channel. The dessert is made with a ripe, split banana and topped with three pounds of home-churned vanilla, strawberry and chocolate ice cream. Fresh strawberries and pineapples are added on top, followed by a gooey river of rich chocolate sauce.
