= Peek Freans =

Former biscuit company based in London, now a global brand

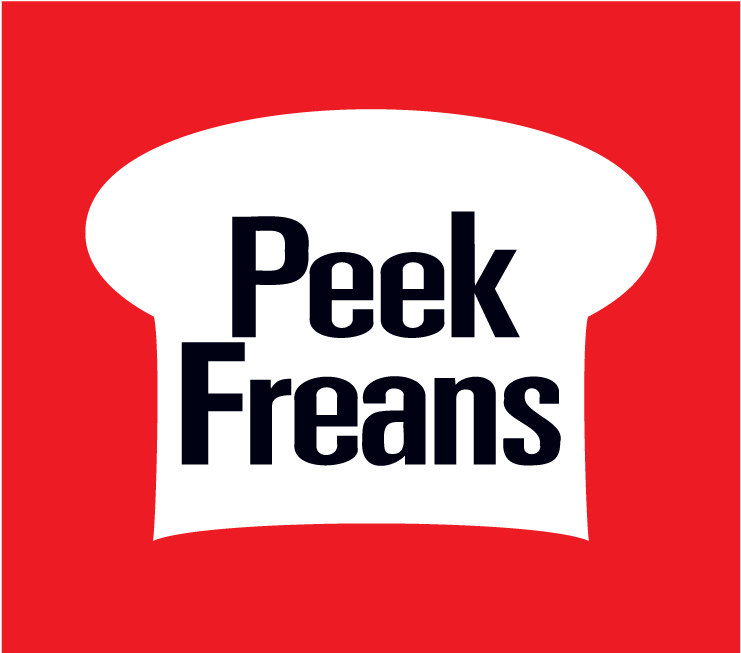
- Type: Public
- Industry: Food
- Founded: 1857; 169 years ago
- Defunct: 26 May 1989; 37 years ago
- Fate: Company defunct, became a brand
- Headquarters: Bermondsey, Greater London, England
- Owner: United Biscuits (UK); Mondelez (North America); English Biscuit Manufacturers (Pakistan)

Peek Freans is a global brand of biscuits and related confectionery owned by various food businesses. It was formerly a biscuit-making company based in Bermondsey, London, England.

== History ==
James Peek (1800–1879) was one of three brothers born in Dodbrooke, Devon, to a well-off family. In 1821, the three brothers founded a tea importation company, established as Peek Brothers and Co., in the East End of London. By the 1840s, the company was importing £5,000,000 of tea per annum.

In 1824, Peek married Elizabeth Masters (1799–1867). The couple had eight children. By 1857, two of his late-teenage sons had announced that they were not going to join the family tea import business. Peek wanted them in a complementary trade and proposed that they start a biscuit business. After founding the business, one of the sons died in his early 20s, the other quickly decided on a different course and emigrated to North America. As a consequence, Peek needed someone to run the biscuit business. One of his nieces, Hannah Peek, had recently married George Hender Frean, a miller and ship biscuit maker in Devon, so Peek wrote to Frean asking him to manage the new biscuit business.

=== Establishment ===
The partners registered their business in 1857 as Peek, Frean & Co. Ltd, based in a disused sugar refinery on Mill Street in Dockhead, South East London, in the west of Bermondsey. With a quickly expanding business, in 1860, Peek engaged his friend John Carr, the apprenticed son of the Carlisle-based Scottish milling and biscuit-making family, Carr's.

From 1861, Peek, Frean & Co. Ltd started exporting biscuits to Australia, but outgrew their premises from 1870 after agreeing to fulfil an order from the French Army for 460 long tons (470 t) of biscuits for the ration packs supplied to soldiers fighting the Franco-Prussian War. After hostilities ended, the French Government ordered a further 16,000 long tons (16,000 t)/11 million sweet "Pearl" biscuits in celebration of the end of the Siege of Paris, and further flour supplies for Paris in 1871 and 1872, with financing undertaken by their bankers the Rothschilds. The consequential consumer demands of emigrating French expatriate soldiers, allowed the company to start exporting directly to Ontario, Canada from the mid-1870s.

==== Biscuit Town ====
In 1865, Peek agreed with Carr that the business needed bigger premises. In exchange for a stake in the business, Carr gave the company 10 acres (4.0 ha) of market gardens he had recently bought on Clements Road and Drummond Road, Bermondsey. Commissioning a new integrated factory, its resultant scale and emanations of sweet smells resulted in Bermondsey gaining the nickname "Biscuit Town". The opening of the factory coincided in 1866 with James Peek stepping down from the business, installing his son-in-law Thomas Stone in his place.

On 23 April 1873, the old Dockhead factory burnt down in a spectacular fire, which brought the Prince of Wales out on a London Fire Brigade horse-drawn water pump to view the resulting explosions.

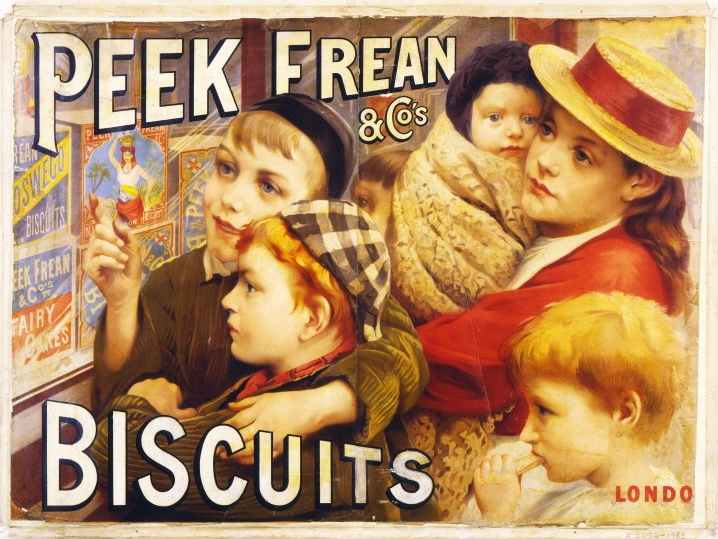
1891 advertisement in London by Thomas Benjamin Kennington

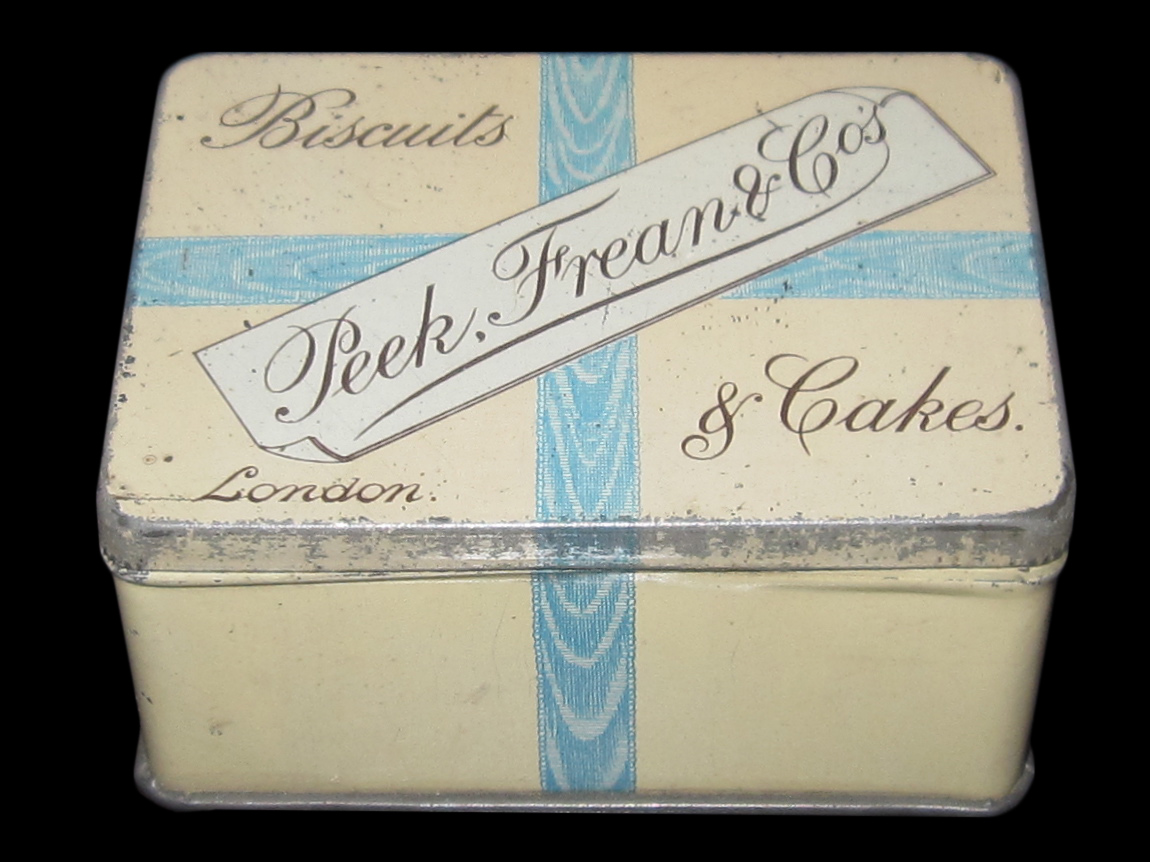
Old tin box by Peek, Frean & Co.

James Peek died aged 79 at his home in Watcombe near Torquay, Devon. After George Frean's son James Frean retired in 1887, his family had nothing more to do with running the business. Peek's nephew Francis Hedley Peek (1858–1904) became the first chairman of the now publicly listed company in 1901. However, on his death in 1904, again the Peek family had nothing more to do with managing the business. John Carr's family remained actively associated with the business for several more generations.

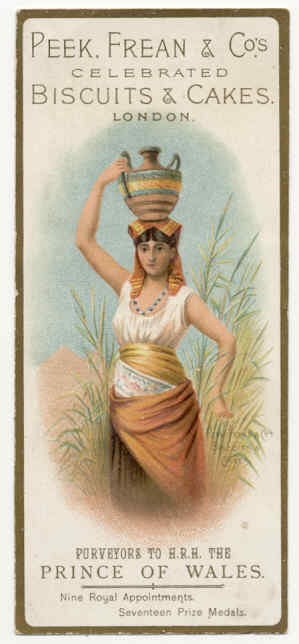
Peek Freans Bookmark c. 1900

In 1906, the Peek, Frean and Co. factory in Bermondsey was the subject of one of the earliest documentary films shot by Cricks and Sharp. This was in part to celebrate an expansion of the company's cake business, which later made the wedding cakes for both Princess Elizabeth and Philip Mountbatten and Charles, Prince of Wales, and Lady Diana Spencer.

In 1924, the company established their first factory outside the UK, in Dum Dum, India. In 1931, six personnel from the Bermondsey factory went to Australia to train the staff in the new factory in Camperdown in Sydney. In 1949, they established their first bakery in Canada, located on Bermondsey Road in East York, Ontario, which still today produces Peek Freans branded products.

After 126 years, the London factory was closed by then owner BSN on Wednesday 26 May 1989. The closing down of the factory in Bermondsey was the subject of the 1988 documentary film Old Ways New Ways made by local, independent filmmakers Sands Films, directed by Olivier Stockman.

Left derelict for a long period, the former premises were eventually redeveloped into what today is called the Tower Bridge Business Complex. One of the streets near the site of the factory is still called Frean Street, after the company's co-founder. In 2020, plans to redevelop the former Biscuit Town site as build-to-rent (BTR) housing were announced, with a £500m, 1600-home BTR scheme given planning permission in March 2024.

In late 2011, a tinned Christmas pudding was discovered at the back of a kitchen cupboard in Poole, Dorset. Donated to the museum at Portsmouth Historic Dockyard, it was a "Peek, Frean & Co's Teetotal Plum Pudding—London, High Class Ingredients Only" from 1900. It was one of a thousand puddings sent to British sailors during the Boer War on behalf of Agnes Weston, superintendent of the Royal Naval Temperance Society – hence its recipe being alcohol-free.

=== Innovation ===
From the outset of its establishment, the company produced what were then the established form of biscuits in the Commonwealth countries, a hard, square, pin-pricked (known as "docker-holes", introduced by the baker to stop the biscuit expanding like a bread) dry style, suitable for storage on ships in passage due to its longevity. However, Carr brought his knowledge of both the Scottish cake-like tradition (i.e., shortbread), and experience during his apprenticeship of Dutch sweet and soft cookies. With James Peek still viewing the business as a complementary and co-marketing opportunity to the family's tea company, they began introducing sweetened product lines:

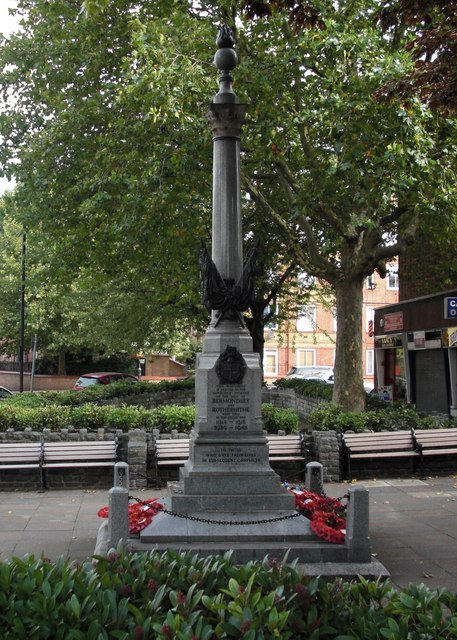
The World War I memorial in Rotherhithe, London, greatly financed by Peek Frean and erected in 1921

- 1861: sweet fruit-filled biscuit, the Garibaldi, named after Italian general Giuseppe Garibaldi who toured the UK in 1854.
- 1865: a soft biscuit, the "Pearl". This was the first soft biscuit introduced by a UK-based manufacturer
- 1875: the "Marie", an Anglicised version of the Galletas Marías
- 1899: the first chocolate covered sweet digestive biscuit, marketed as the "Chocolate Table"
- 1902: "Pat-a-Cake" shortbread
- 1909: the "Golden Puff"
- 1910: a biscuit with crème filling, launched as the "Creola", now known as the Bourbon biscuit
- 1912: the "Shortcake"
- 1923: the "Glaxo"
- 1930s: Cheeselets and Twiglets introduced.

Like many good employers of the Victorian age, the company developed an enlightened paternalistic approach, giving many innovative benefits to its employees. At its Biscuit Town factory, much like a mini-town, as well as having: an on-site bank, post office and fire station; employees and their families had free-to-use access to on-site medical, dental and optical services. The original contracted hours were 68 across a Monday-Saturday double-shift pattern, but these were reduced from 1868 without a reduction in pay, noted as highly beneficial by Henry Mayhew. The directors wanted to ensure that the workers indulged in "virtuous pursuits", and so formed the first of the company paid-for societies, included: a cricket club (1868); musical society (1907); and athletic and dramatic societies (both 1908). Post-World War I, the company set up a tribunal, through which workers could freely express and debate their concerns. This resulted in the company giving its employees a pension plan, plus a week's paid holiday per year.

=== Associated Biscuit Manufacturers ===
In 1921, Peek Frean entered into an amalgamation agreement with rival biscuit firm Huntley & Palmers, resulting in the creation of a holding company, Associated Biscuit Manufacturers Ltd (ABM). However, both biscuit firms retained their own brands and premises. Jacob's joined the conglomerate from 1961. English Biscuit Manufacturers (EBM) was established in Pakistan as a local joint-venture production company from 1965, which still owns the various brand rights in the country.

During the course of its life, the firm's brand name changed from Peek, Frean and Co. to Peek Frean (in the early twentieth century) and then to Peek Freans (by the 1970s, the name having been used in the possessive case on products for many years).

In the 1970s Peek Freans were advertised with the popular jingle, "Peek Freans are a Very Serious Cookie."

=== Present ===
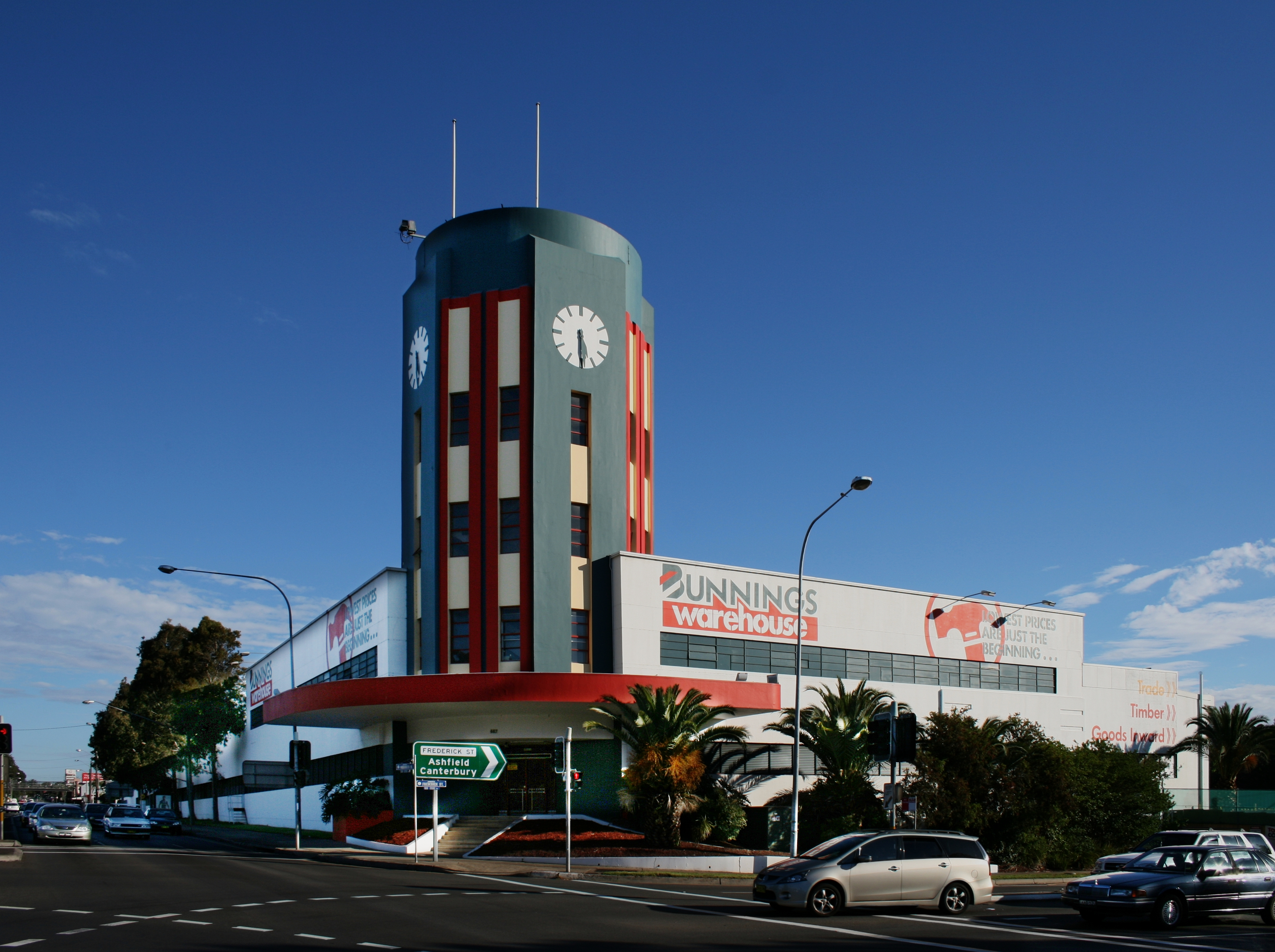
The Peek Frean tower in Ashfield, Australia. As of 2022, it was a Bunnings store

The company was broken apart from 1982, after Nabisco bought ABM. In 1985, Nabisco was acquired by the foods division of R. J. Reynolds Tobacco Company, resulting in the creation of conglomerate RJR Nabisco. After RJR Nabisco was bought in a leveraged buyout by Kohlberg Kravis Roberts, to pay down the resulting debt, various assets were sold off. This included dividing the former Peek Freans company; the North America division was sold to Kraft Foods, the European mainly-UK division was sold to the European food conglomerate BSN (now known as Groupe Danone), and many of the international subsidiaries were sold off locally to in-country investors, e.g. EBM. As part of its cost cutting, BSN ended use and marketing of the brand in the UK, which allowed it to shut the factory in Bermondsey. In September 2004 United Biscuits bought what was by then known as the Jacob's Biscuit Group for £240 million from Groupe Danone.

In 2017, the Peek Frean trademark was acquired by the great-great-grandson of Francis Hedley-Peek, the first Chairman of Peek Frean and the nephew of founder James Peek.

== See also ==
- English Biscuit Manufacturers
- Burton's Foods
- Fox's Biscuits
- Tunnock's
