= Chocolate salami =

Italian and Portuguese chocolate dessert

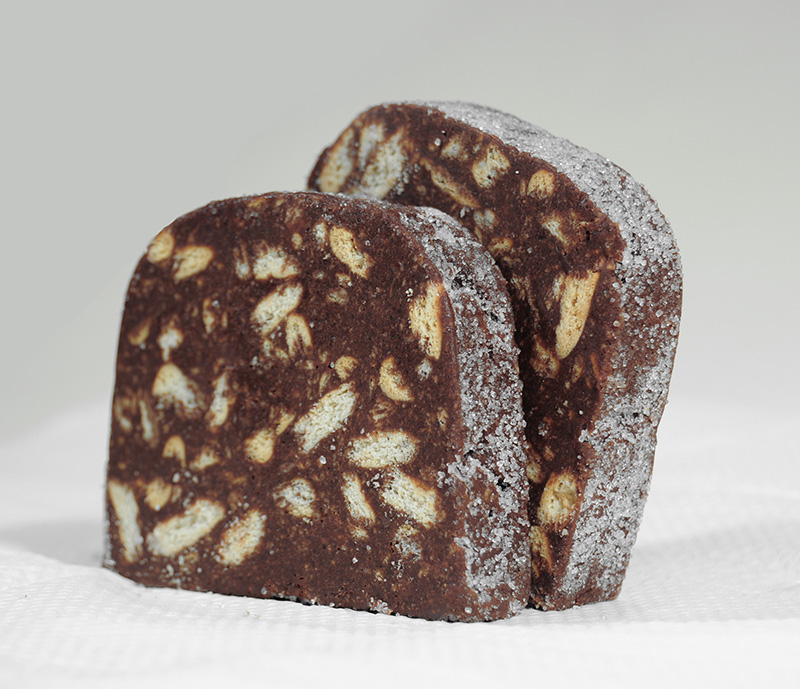
- Alternative names: Salame al cioccolato (Italian), salame de chocolate (Portuguese)
- Course: Dessert
- Place of origin: Italy; Portugal
- Main ingredients: Cocoa, chocolate, broken biscuits, butter, sometimes nuts

Chocolate salami is an Italian and Portuguese dessert made with cocoa, chocolate, broken biscuits, butter and sometimes alcohol such as port wine or rum. The dessert became popular across Europe and elsewhere, often losing alcohol as an ingredient along the way.

== International variations ==
=== Asia ===
In Jordan, it is known as ليزي كيك, which is usually made with Marie biscuit.

Elsewhere in the Arab World, it goes by soukseh or حلا القصدير, where its sometimes made with qishta.

=== Europe ===
In Greece, chocolate salami is called mosaiko or kormos.

In Estonia, it is known as Kirjukoer, which is commonly made out of cocoa powder, butter, crushed cookies, and jelly cubes.

In Italy, it is called salame di cioccolato.

In Portugal, it is called salame de chocolate, and is typically made using Marie biscuit.

In Romania, it is called salam de biscuiți, and it may have originated during the 1970s or 1980s in the communist era.

In Russia and the former Soviet Union, it is called шоколадная колбаса (shokoladnaya kolbasa), and became a widely popular homemade dessert during the Soviet era.

In Turkey, it is called mozaik pasta.

In Lithuania, it is called Tinginys.

=== South America ===
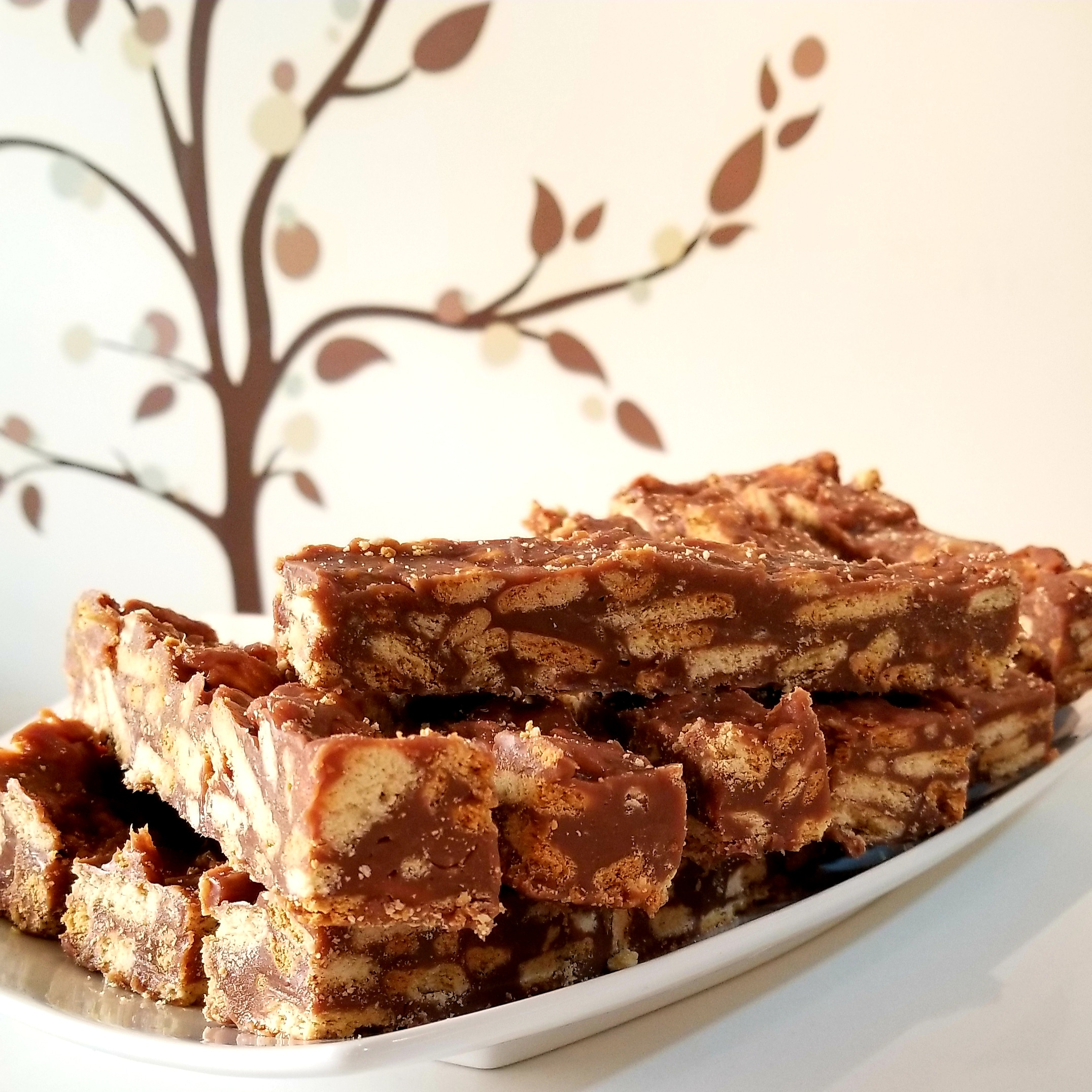
Brazilian palha italiana

In Brazil, it is known as palha italiana. It is usually made with Marie biscuits added to a brigadeiro mixture.

Similarly, in Argentina, it is called salame de chocolate.

== See also ==
- List of Italian desserts and pastries
