= Hedgehog slice =

European snack

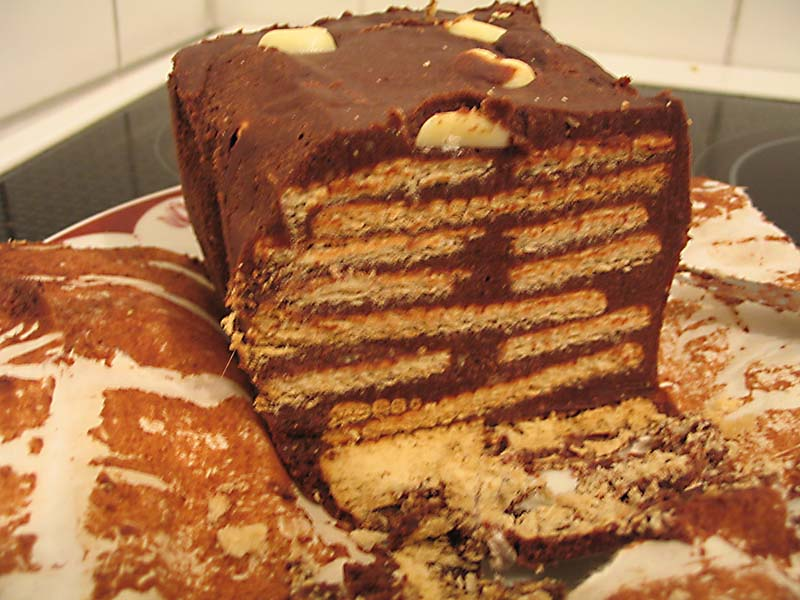
- Type: Square
- Place of origin: Germany
- Region or state: Europe
- Main ingredients: Crushed biscuit, or rice puffs

Hedgehog slice is an uncooked flat, square or bar-shaped chocolate snack, similar to rocky road, made of chocolate and crushed or complete biscuits, or rice puffs. Nuts may also be added. It usually has a topping of chocolate icing, upon which may be sprinkled coconut, hundreds and thousands, or other kinds of sprinkles or raisins (e.g. chocolate or coffee flavoured, etc.).

The dish goes by a variety of names. In German it is called Kalter Hund (cold dog), Kalte Schnauze (cold snout) or Kellerkuchen (cellar cake). In some languages it is named after its appearance, such as Swedish radiokaka (named for both its resemblance to old-time radios and its ability to be eaten soundlessly so as to not disturb radio broadcasts), Turkish Mozaik Pastası or Greek Mosaico. The Danish kiksekage and Serbo-Croatian keks torta simply mean biscuit cake. The Dutch name Arretjescake comes from a promotional recipe book published by Calvé and is named after its mascot character, while the Norwegian Delfiakake refers to the Delfia deep-frying fat mentioned in this recipe. In New Zealand it is called fudge cake.

The dish is derived from chocolate salami which was invented in the beginning of the twentieth century and which in turn traces its heritage to various kinds of fake sausage confectionery without chocolate from the start of the nineteenth century.

Many German histories refer to a 1920s recipe from baking firm Bahlsen that combined chocolate with packaged cookies. The name "Kalter Hund" has been theorized to have passed into German through the Slovak word hyntow (box-shaped trolley), which might have been a reference to the rectangular pans in which the dessert is often made. In Germany, it is often described as a retro food that conjures nostalgic associations of the 1950s. In 2019, inhabitants of Ronneburg made a 994.9 meter long cake, the longest to date in Germany.

== See also ==
- Batik cake, Malaysian version of hedgehog slice
- Chocolate biscuit pudding, Sri Lankan version of hedgehog slice
- List of desserts
