= English Biscuit Manufacturers =

Pakistani biscuits manufacturer

- Formerly: Peek Freans Pakistan Limited (1965–1966)
- Type: Private
- Industry: Food processing Fast-moving consumer goods
- Founded: 1965; 61 years ago in Karachi, Pakistan
- Headquarters: Karachi, Pakistan
- Area served: Worldwide
- Key people: Zeelaf Munir (CEO)
- Products: Biscuits, cookies, cakes
- Brands: Peek Freans, Sooper, Gluco, Rio, Marie, Click, Peanut Pik, Saltish, Cake Up, Smile
- Revenue: ▲ Rs. 81 billion (US$290 million) (2022)
- Subsidiaries: Coronet Foods
- Website: ebm.com.pk

English Biscuit Manufacturers (EBM), doing business as Peek Freans, is a Pakistani biscuits manufacturer based in Karachi. EBM owns the Pied Piper trademark in Pakistan.

== History ==
English Biscuit Manufacturers (EBM) was founded in 1965 as Peek Freans Pakistan Limited through a joint venture with 25.25 percent shareholding held by Peek Freans and 74.65 percent by House of Manji. In 1966, it was renamed as English Biscuit Manufacturers after a rebranding of its UK-based parent company, Associated Biscuits. A few years later, Manji family sold its stake to Arag Group.

In 1967, EBM began producing the Peek Freans biscuit in Pakistan.

EBM also runs the Centre of Excellence to support rese and development in food technology, nutrition, biochemistry, and related fields.

== Brands ==
- Saltish (1968)
- Marie (1971)
- Chocolate Sandwich (1971)
- Lemon Sandwich (1973)
- Butter Puff (1974)
- Click (1976)
- Peanut Pik (1984)
- Zeera (1984)
- Gluco (1987)
- Party (1996)
- Sooper (1996)
- Rio (2003)
- Farm House Cookies (2011)
- Nan Khatai (2015)
- Chocolicious (2015)
- Jam Delight (2017)
- Cake Up (2018)
- Choco Bites (2019)
- Choco Lava (2019)
- Cake-UP Triple Chocolate (2019)
- Cake-UP Sandwich (2020)
- Sooper Soft Bakes (2021)
