= Marie biscuit =

Vanilla-flavored tea biscuit

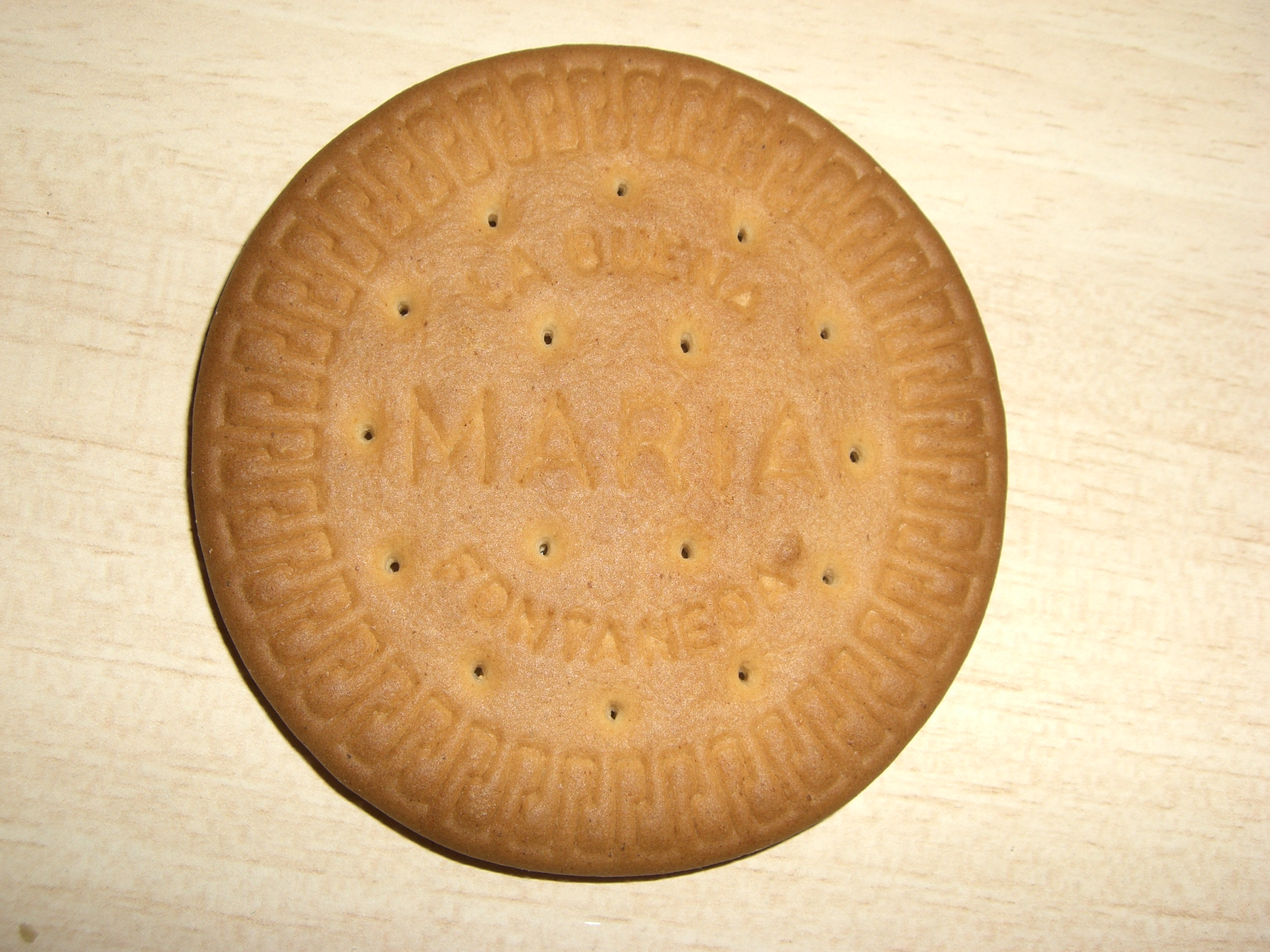
- The most widely known María biscuit in Spain is made by Fontaneda, now owned by Mondelēz
- Type: Biscuit
- Place of origin: United Kingdom
- Created by: Peek Freans
- Main ingredients: Wheat flour, vegetable oil, vanilla

A Marie biscuit is a type of biscuit similar to a rich tea biscuit. It is also known (in various languages) as María, Mariebon and Marietta, amongst other names.

== Description ==
The biscuit is round and usually has the name embossed upon its top surface, the edges of which are also embossed with an intricate design. It is made with wheat flour, sugar, palm oil or sunflower seed oil and, unlike the rich tea biscuit, is typically vanilla-flavoured.

== History ==
The Marie biscuit was created by the London bakery Peek Freans in 1874 to commemorate the marriage of the Grand Duchess Maria Alexandrovna of Russia to the Duke of Edinburgh. It became popular throughout Europe, particularly in Portugal and Spain where, following the Civil War, the biscuit became a symbol of the country's economic recovery after bakeries produced mass quantities to consume a surplus of wheat. Marie biscuits became popular in South Africa and Namibia after going into production by Bakers Biscuits in 1898.

== Consumption ==
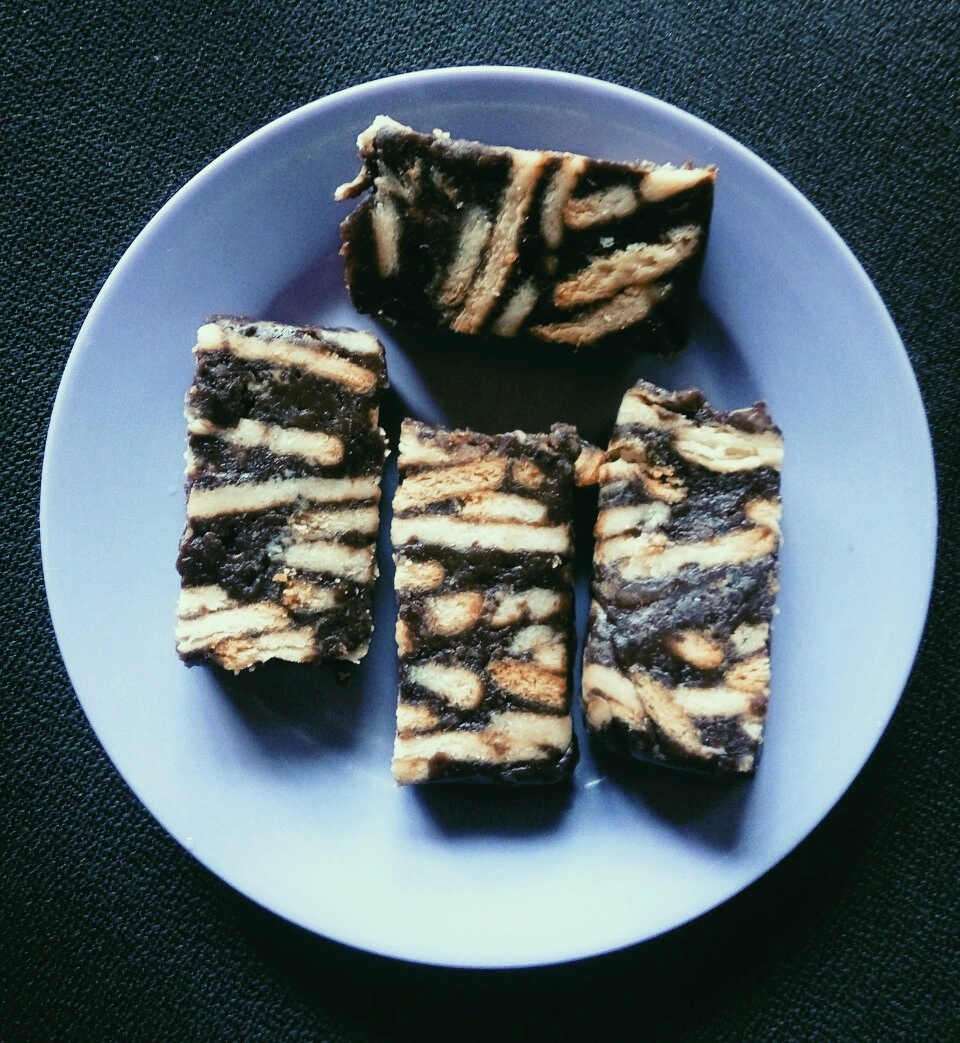
Marie biscuit used to make batik cake, a type of chocolate cake (similar to the hedgehog slice) popular in Malaysia, Brunei, and Singapore

Many consider that the plain flavour of Maries makes them, like rich tea biscuits, particularly suitable for dunking in tea. Other popular methods of consuming the biscuit include using two to make a sandwich with butter and Marmite or condensed milk spread in between; covering it with golden syrup; or crumbling it up in custard and jelly (gelatin dessert). Marie biscuits are also a common ingredient in home-baking recipes.

In Spain, natillas custard is typically served with a Maria biscuit on top. They are also an essential component of the Portuguese dessert known as serradura.

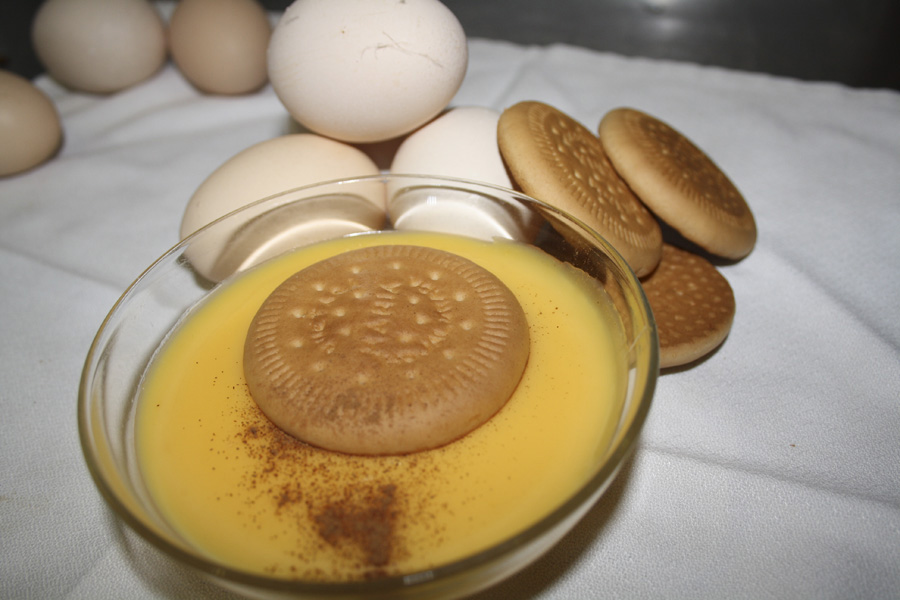
Spanish natillas, typically served with a María biscuit on top

In Uruguay, they are served filled with dulce de leche and sprinkled with shredded coconut. In Brazil, they are soaked in milk and then stacked in layers of chocolate and vanilla-flavoured custard cream, with whipped cream and crushed cashew nuts on top to make pavê, a popular Brazilian dessert. In Ireland, the biscuits are known as Marietta and manufactured by Jacob's. In Malaysia, people use them mainly for making batik cake. In India, they are commonly eaten plain with tea or sold in bakeries after coating with chocolate and wrapped in foil.

== Manufacturers ==
The major international manufacturers (initially sorted by country name):

Country/Region	Producer	Brands
Argentina	Arcor	Maná
Argentina	Arcor	Vocación
Australia	Arnott's Biscuits Holdings	Marie
Belarus	Slodych, confectionery factory	Marierta
Belarus	Confectionary Factory Spartak	Mariya (Мария)
Belgium	Delacre	Maria
Bolivia	La Suprema	María Bonita
Brazil	Fábrica Fortaleza	Maria
Brazil	Piraquê	Maria
Brazil	Richester	Maria
Brazil	Vitarella	Maria
Canada	President's Choice	Maria
Costa Rica	Pozuelo	Maria
Denmark	KelsenBisca	Mariekiks
Ecuador	Nestlé Ecuador S.A.	María
Egypt	Biscomisr	Marie
Finland	Kantolan (Made in Latvia for Orkla Suomi Finland Oy Ab)	Kulta Marie
Germany	Patisserie Gunz	Maria
Hong Kong	The Garden Company Limited	Marie Biscuits
India	Disha Foods	Treff
India	Bonn Food Industries	Mariebon
India	Britannia Industries	Marie Gold, Vita Marie
India	Parle Products	Marie
India	ITC Limited	Marie Light
India	DK Bakings Kolkata	Nutribake Morning Marie
Indonesia	CV Jaya Abadi	Marie Regal Biscuits
Indonesia	Mayora	Roma Marie Gold, Roma Marie Susu
Ireland	Jacob's	Marietta
Japan	Morinaga & Company	Marie (マリー)
Jordan	Universal Industries Co. Ltd. Zalloum Group	Marie or ماري
Kenya	Manji Food Industries Ltd.	Marie
Kuwait	Kuwait Flour Mills & Bakeries Co.	Marie ماري
Libya	Muhab Food Co. Benghazi	Marie Biscuits
Lebanon	Ghandour Food	Marie Biscuits, Lucky 555
Malaysia	Hup Seng Perusahaan Makanan (M) Sdn. Bhd.	Ping Pong Marie
Malaysia	Hwa Tai Industries Bhd.	Hwa Tai Marie
Malaysia	Munchy Food Industries Sdn. Bhd.	Munchy's Marie
Malaysia	Perfect Food Manufacturing (M) Sdn. Bhd.	Julie's Marie
Mauritius	Esko & Co ltd.	Marie
Mexico	Gamesa	Galletas Maria
Mexico	Goya	Marias
Norway	First Price (NorgesGruppen)	Mariekjeks
Norway	Sætre AS	Marie
Netherlands	Pally Holland	Mariakaakje, Marie
Netherlands	Verkade	Maria
Panama	Productos Alimenticios Pascual S. A.	Maria
Pakistan	English Biscuit Manufacturers	Marie
Philippines	Comfoods	Fibisco Marie Biscuits
Philippines	Rebisco	Marie Biscuit, Marie Time, Marie Munch, Marie Gold
Portugal	Cuétara, Moaçor, Triunfo, Vieira de Castro	Bolacha Maria, Bolacha Maria Oro
Saudi Arabia	United Food Industries Corp. Ltd. Co.	DeemaH Marie
Singapore	Khong Guan Biscuit Factory (S) Pte. Ltd.	Marie Biscuits, Small Marie Biscuits
South Africa	Bakers Blue Label	Marie Biscuits, Cappuccino Marie Biscuits
South Africa	Baumann's	Marie Biscuits
South Africa	Casa-Mia	Traditional Marie, Marie Toffee
South Africa	Bisco Plus	Henro Marie
South Africa	Continental Brands	Risi Marie, Risi Petit Marie, Cuétara Maria Cookie 0%
South Africa	Unity Food Products	Marie
Spain	Gullón	María Leche, María Dorada, María Hojaldrada
Spain	Grupo Siro	María Clásica, María Dorada, María Hojaldrada, Mini María
Spain	Cuétara	María, María Oro, María Hojaldrada
Spain	Fontaneda (Mondelez International)	La Buena María
Spain	Marbú (Artiach)	Marbú Dorada
Sri Lanka	CBL (Munchee)	Tikiri Marie, Marie Light, Rice Marie, Chocolate Marie
Sri Lanka	Cargills (Ceylon) PLC	Kist Marie
Sri Lanka	Daintee Ltd	Daintee Marie
Sri Lanka	Luckyland	Luckyland Marie
Sri Lanka	Maliban Biscuit Manufactories Limited	Gold Marie, Light Marie, Chocolate Marie, Premium Marie
Sri Lanka	Manchester Foods Pvt Ltd (Bisma)	Ceylon Marie
South Korea	Orion	Marie
Sweden	Göteborgs Kex	Guld Marie
Syria	Katalina Foods	
Thailand	Laemthong Food Industries Co. Ltd.	Laemthong Marie
Turkey	Şimşek Biscuits & Foods	Gorona
Turkey	ANI Biscuits & Foods	Marie
Ukraine	Zhytomyr Confectionary Factory ZhL	Mariya (Марія)
Ukraine	Yarych Confectionary Factory	Mariya (Марія)
Ukraine	Kharkiv Biscuit Factory	Mariya (Марія)
United Kingdom	Crawford's	Marie
United Kingdom	McVitie's	Marie
United States	Iberia, Goya	Maria cookies
Uruguay	Kraft Foods	Maria de Famosa
Uruguay	El Trigal	Maria Rika
Venezuela	C.A. Sucesora de Jose Puig & CIA	Maria Puig
Vietnam	Kinh Do Corporation	Cosy Marie
Yemen	Yemen Company for Industry and Commerce	Marie
Zimbabwe	Lebena	Marie
Zimbabwe	Lobels	Marie
Zimbabwe	Arenel	Marie
