= Rocky road (dessert) =

Confectionary made of chocolate and marshmallow

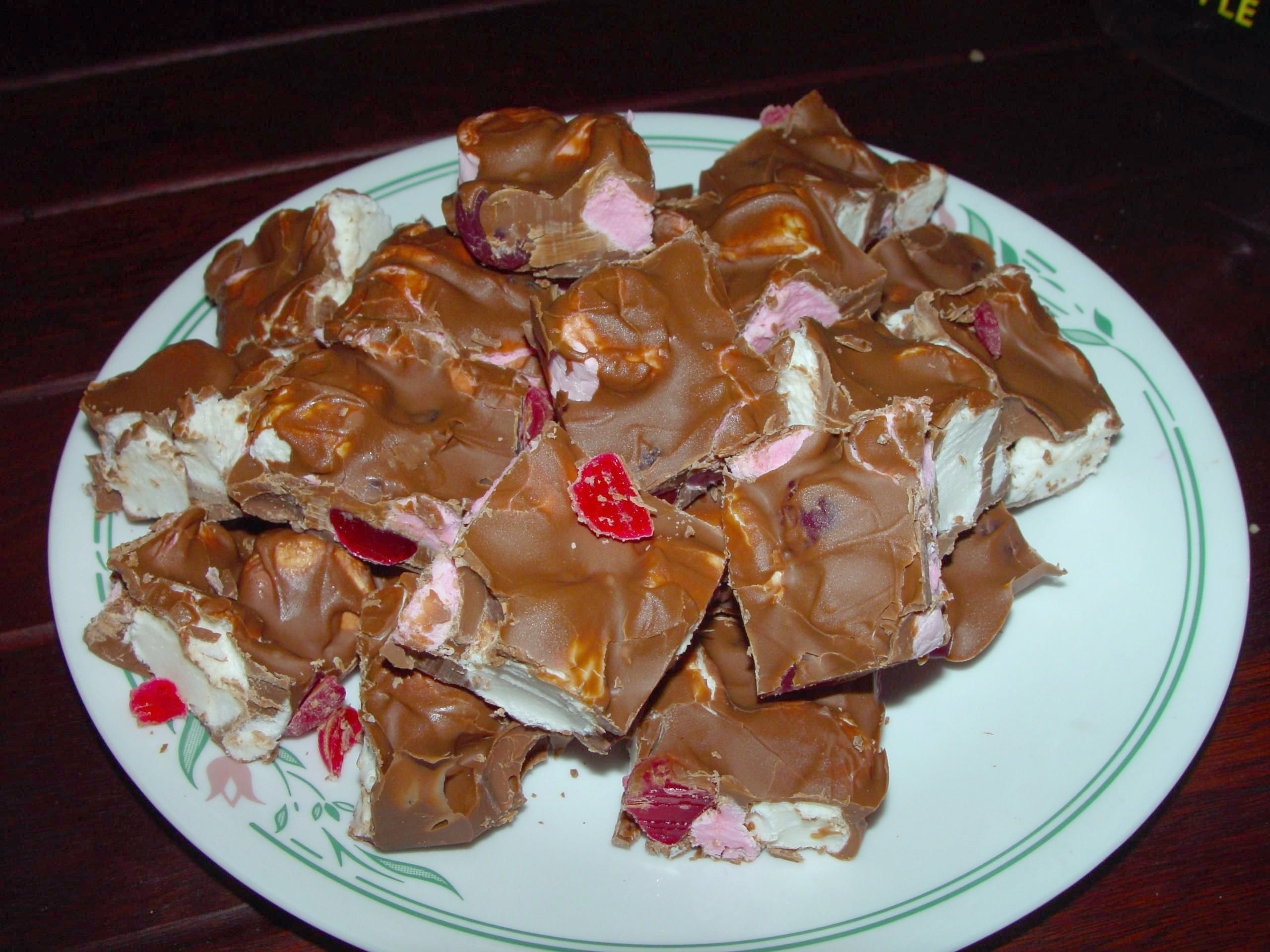
Australian-style rocky road

Rocky road is a candy, made up of various ingredients—typically including nuts, marshmallows, and dried fruit—that are combined with melted chocolate and left to set. In Australia, gummy candies often feature. The confectionery is most common in Australia where it is associated with Christmas, and in Britain. In America, rocky road is most popular as an ice cream flavor. Rocky road has also been used as a flavor of biscuits and fudge.

The earliest recipe for rocky road found by the cookbook author Jean Anderson came in Young America’s Cookbook, a 1938 publication of the New York Herald Tribune, though she identifies a potential precursor in a recipe for "Chocolate Marshmallow Fudge" in the 1923 edition of The Boston Cooking-School Cook Book. The food blog Australian Food Timeline traces the earliest mentions of rocky road to around this time in America, with the earliest being a 1920 reference to "Rocky Road Creams" in Santa Cruz, California. Several newspapers soon followed with recipes for the dessert. The 1920s were the period that the first rocky road ice creams are claimed to have been invented.

== Gallery ==
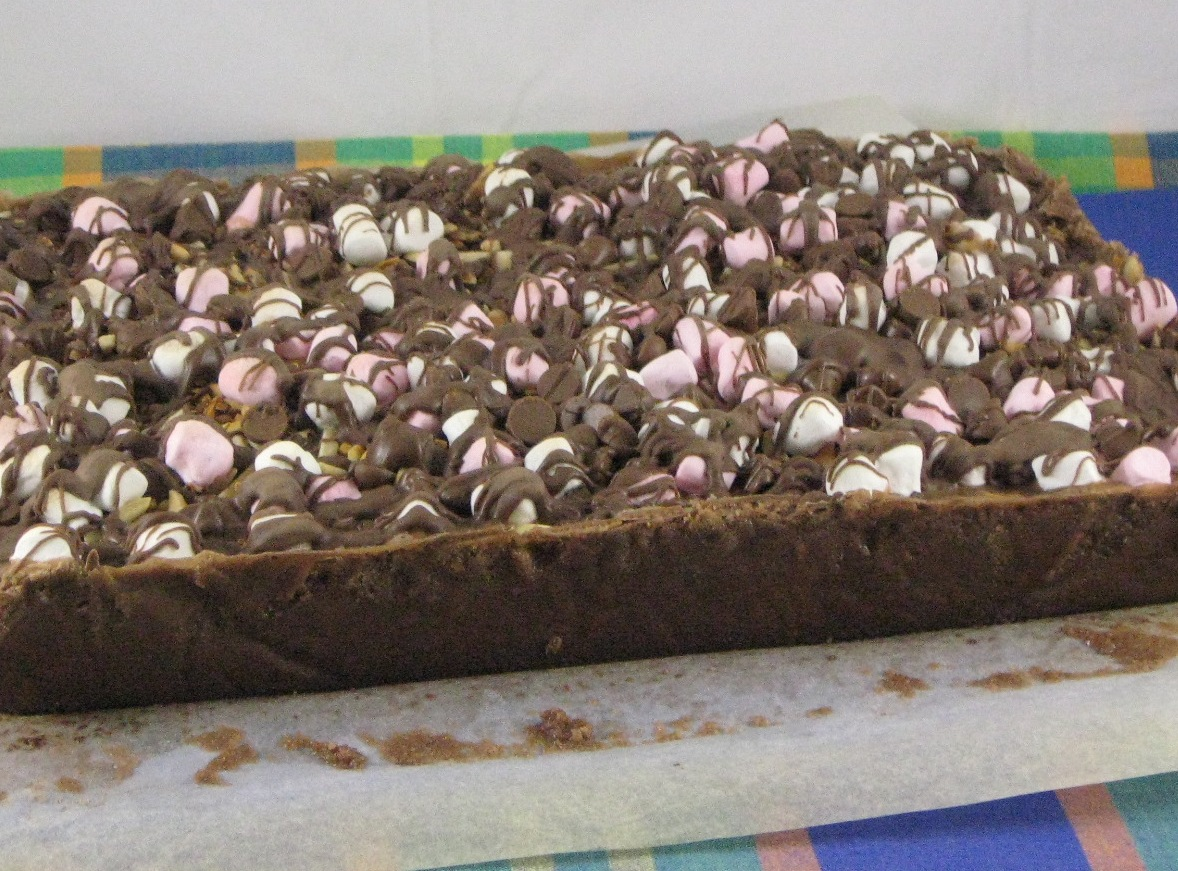
American rocky road brownies

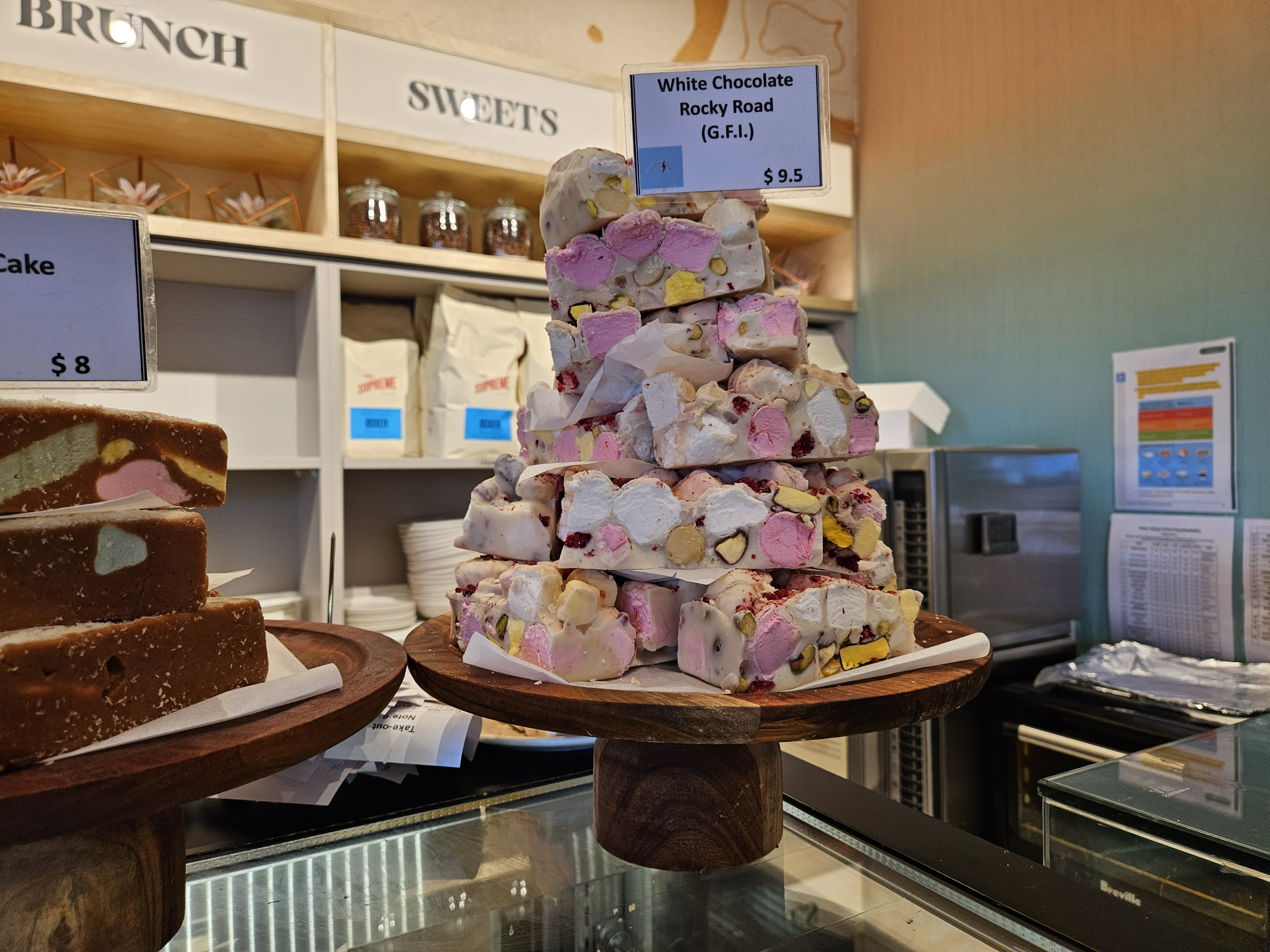
White chocolate rocky road

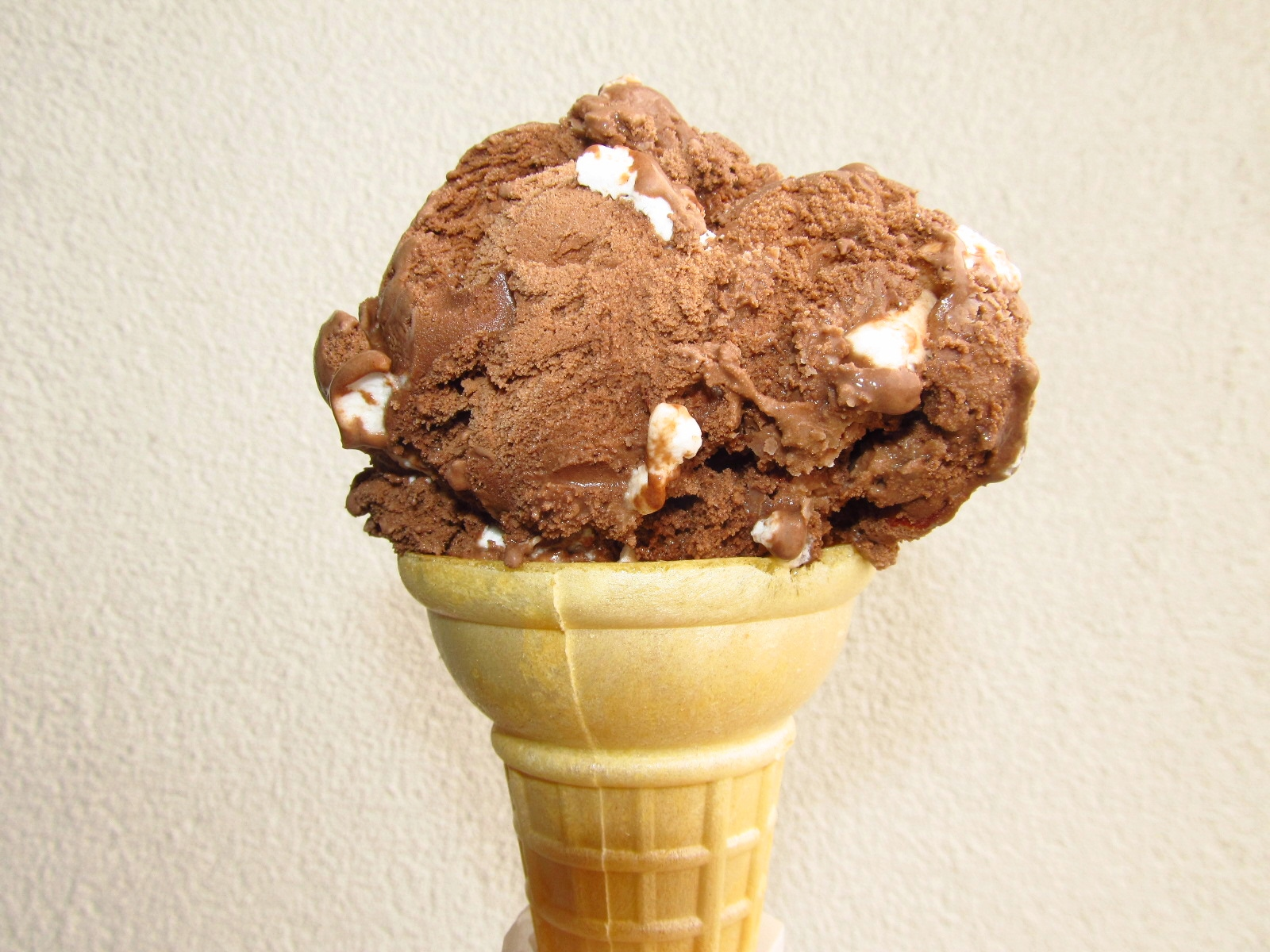
Rocky road ice cream

== See also ==
- Tiffin
- Hedgehog slice
- Rocky Road (candy bar)
