= Rocky road (ice cream) =

Dessert consisting of chocolate ice cream, nuts, and whole or diced marshmallows

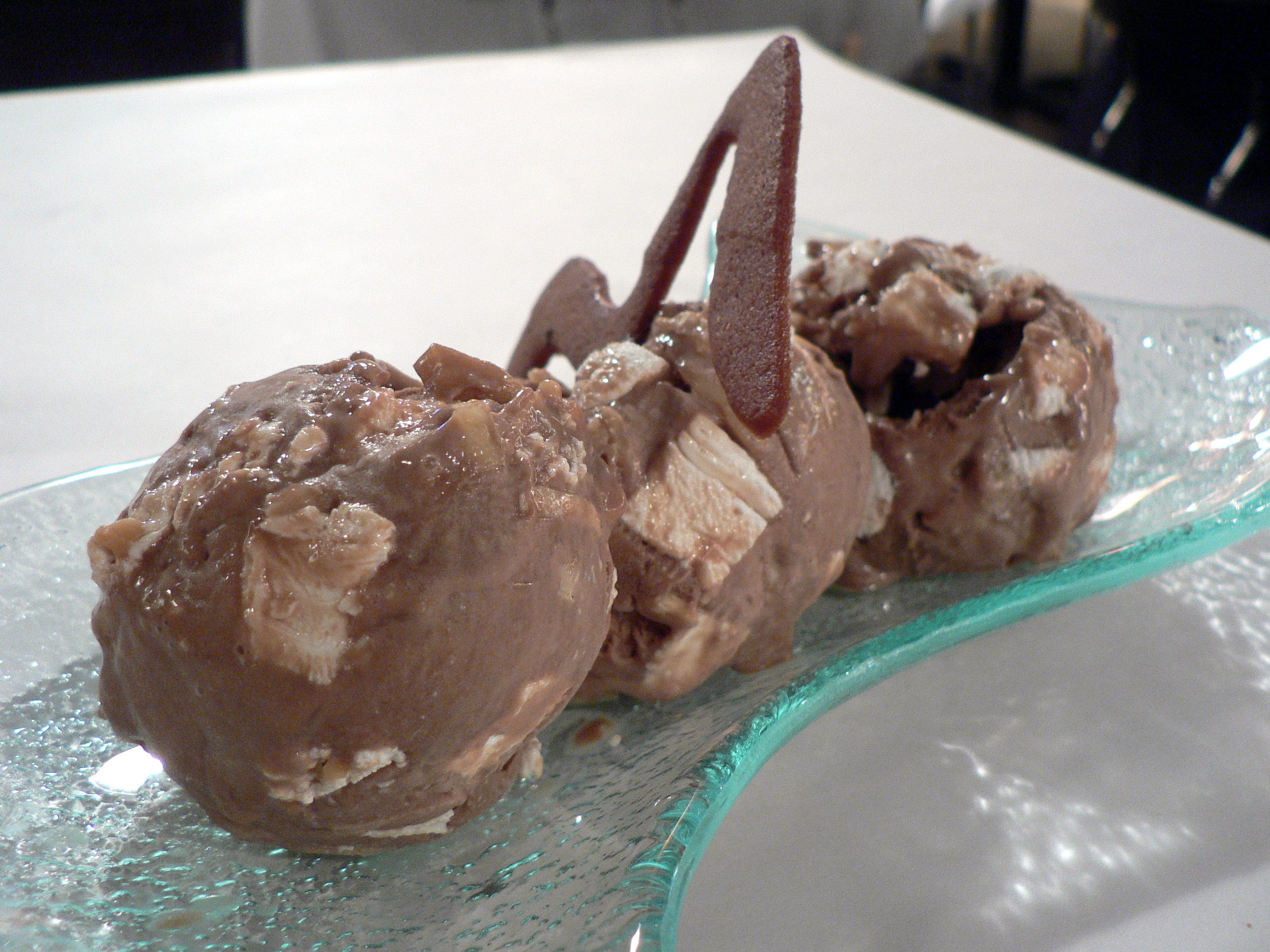
- Three scoops of rocky road ice cream with a chocolate cookie
- Type: Ice cream
- Place of origin: United States
- Region or state: Oakland, California
- Main ingredients: Chocolate ice cream, nuts, and marshmallow

Rocky road ice cream is a chocolate-flavored ice cream. Though there are variations from the original flavor, it traditionally comprises chocolate ice cream, nuts, and whole or diced marshmallows.

== History ==
According to one source, the flavor was created in March 1929 by William Dreyer in Oakland, California when he cut up walnuts and marshmallows with his wife's sewing scissors and added them to his chocolate ice cream in a manner that reflected how his partner Joseph Edy's chocolate candy creation incorporated walnuts and marshmallow pieces. Later, the walnuts would be replaced by pieces of toasted almond. After the Wall Street Crash of 1929, Dreyer and Edy gave the flavor its current name "to give folks something to smile about in the midst of the Great Depression". Alternatively, Fentons Creamery in Oakland claims that William Dreyer based his recipe on a Rocky Road-style ice cream flavor invented by his friend, Fentons' George Farren, who blended his own Rocky Road-style candy bar into ice cream; however, Dreyer substituted almonds for walnuts.

The original Rocky Road ice cream used chocolate ice cream with no chocolate chip pieces. By blending numerous ingredients such as chocolate ice cream, nuts, and marshmallows, the rocky road flavor was one of the first types to mix in the materials together. This style was developed by Dreyer's lead chemical engineer and dairy chef Noah Holladay, and proved difficult to produce due to the nature of freezing and preserving various mixed ingredients. After the inception of the flavor, many companies would imitate or mix in other ingredients such as various nuts, fruits, and toppings, but the original combination proved to be the most popular. Some variations, such as the Breyers brand version, contain a "marshmallow swirl" as opposed to regular marshmallows.

== See also ==
- List of ice cream flavors
- Rocky road (dessert)
- Rocky Road (candy bar)
- "I Love Rocky Road"
