= Icebox cake =

Dessert

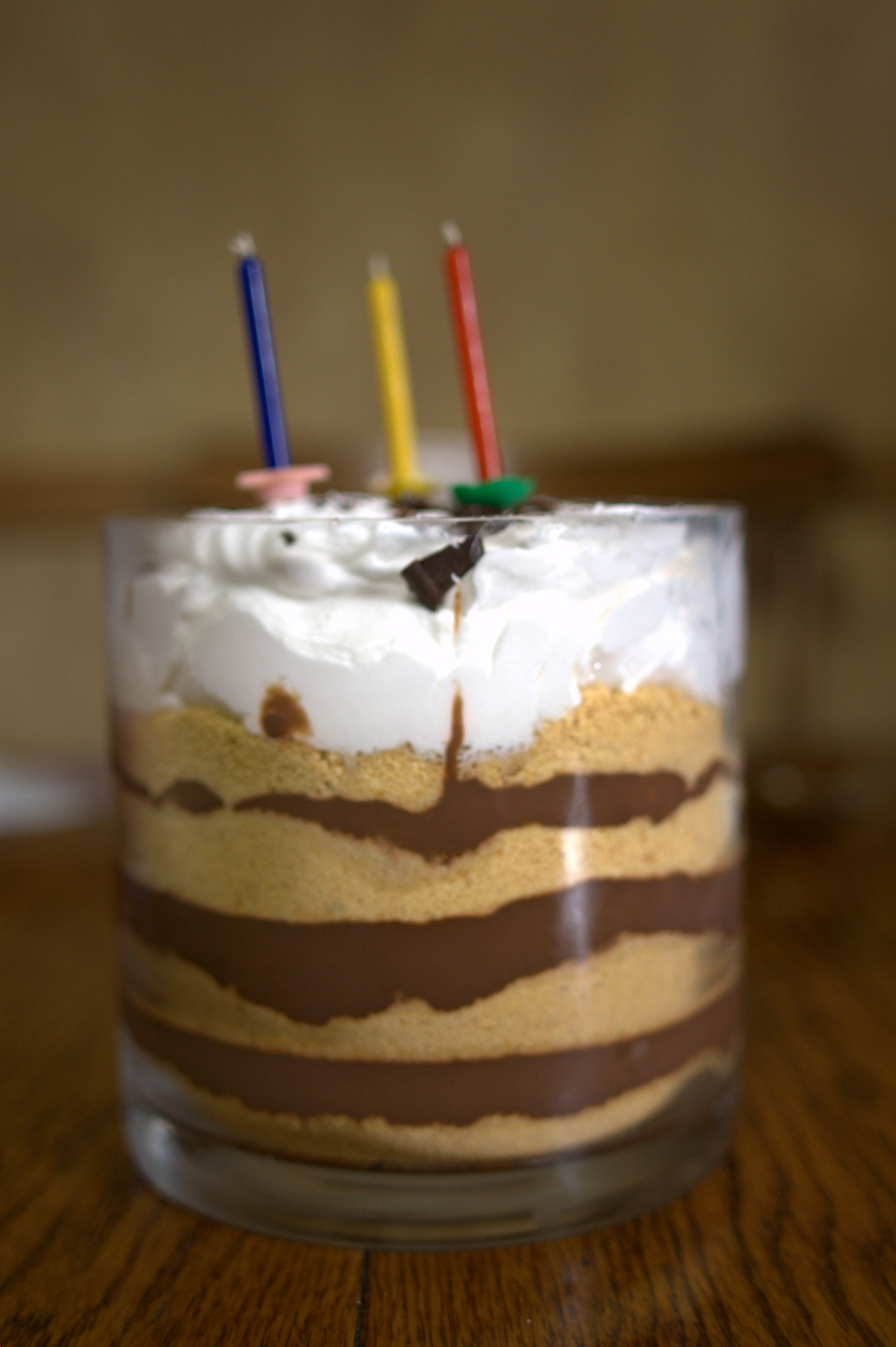
- An icebox cake in a glass, made of graham crackers and chocolate pudding, topped with whipped cream
- Alternative names: zebra cake; chocolate (or choc) ripple cake (or log); biscuit cake; refrigerator cake; graham cake
- Course: Dessert
- Main ingredients: Whipped cream; chocolate wafers (or another type of cookie or biscuit)

An icebox cake, or ice box cake (also known, in Australia, as a chocolate (or choc) ripple cake (or log), and, in the United Kingdom, as a biscuit cake), is a dairy-based dessert made with cream, fruits, nuts, and wafers (or another type of cookie or biscuit) and set in a refrigerator. The recipe for one particularly well-known version used to be printed on the back of boxes of thin and dark Nabisco Famous Chocolate Wafers.

== History ==
The icebox cake is derived from similar desserts such as the charlotte and the trifle, but made simpler to prepare. It was first introduced to the United States in the 1920s, as companies were promoting the icebox as a kitchen appliance. Its popularity rose in the 1920s and 30s, as it used many commercial shortcuts and pre-made ingredients, such as pre-packaged cookies instead of sponges or ladyfingers that people had to bake at home. In response to the dish's popularity, companies that manufactured ingredients for the cake, such as condensed milk and wafer cookies, began printing recipes on the backs of their boxes, including those of Nabisco's Famous Chocolate Wafers.

== Regional variations ==
=== Australia ===
In Australia, the cake is made from Arnott's Choc Ripple biscuits, hence the name in that country of chocolate (or choc) ripple cake. It has been described as "[a] major contender for Australia’s favourite dessert ...", and is strongly associated with Christmas. The biscuits are covered in sweetened whipped cream, and placed in a log formation. This dessert is typically made the day before serving and kept in the refrigerator overnight. It is often decorated with crumbled chocolate, fresh berries or grated Peppermint Crisp.

=== Philippines ===
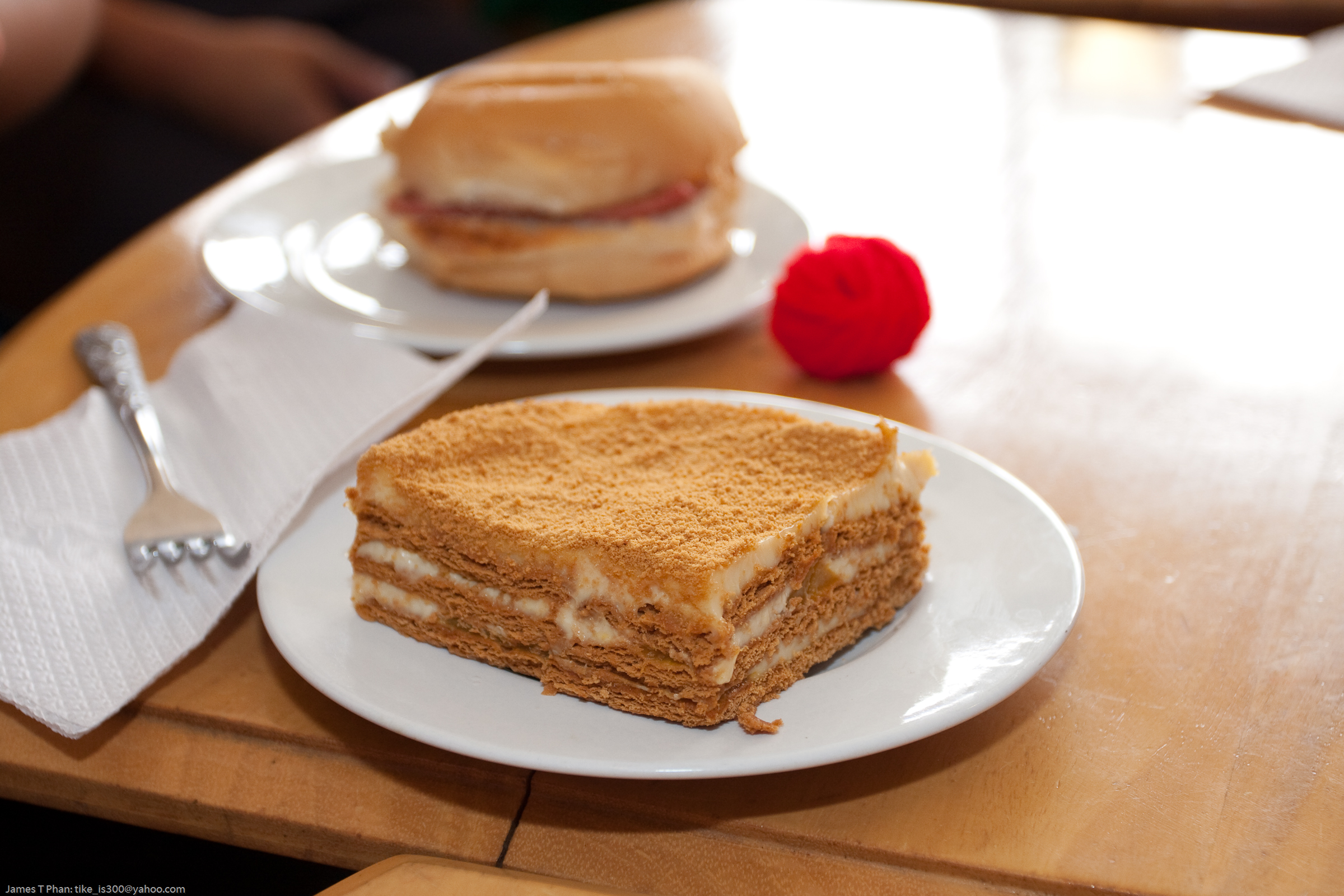
Mango float from the Philippines, an icebox cake variant of crema de fruta

In the Philippines, mango float is a popular icebox cake variant of the traditional crema de fruta layered dessert. It is made with graham crackers or broas (ladyfingers) in between layers of whipped cream, condensed milk, and fresh mangoes.

=== United Kingdom ===
In the United Kingdom, a biscuit cake is an icebox cake commonly served as a tea cake. At the request of Prince William a chocolate biscuit cake was served as a groom's cake at his wedding. It is made by heating butter and chocolate and whisking in eggs or condensed milk. Some versions also include golden syrup. After the mixture is cooled, crumbled digestive biscuits are incorporated into the batter. Optionally other dry ingredients may be mixed in as well such as assorted dried fruits, nuts and candies.

=== United States ===
The Nabisco version of the icebox cake indicates that the wafers are stacked to form a log with whipped cream cementing them together, and then the log is laid on its side. A second log is formed and the two are set side by side and more whipped cream covers the exterior. The cake is then left overnight in the refrigerator (or icebox). The wafers absorb moisture from the whipped cream and the whole can be served in slices. The dessert is usually served by cutting it into slices at a 45-degree angle, so bands of chocolate and cream are visible across each slice.

A variation of icebox cake is made using pudding (usually chocolate) and graham crackers or vanilla wafers layered in a square or rectangular baking dish. Additional variations include alternating layers of chocolate and vanilla pudding, or the addition of sliced bananas or pineapples between the layers. While this can be done with cold instant pudding, if given ample time in the refrigerator, the best results come from assembling the dessert with still-hot, stove-cooked pudding, and then refrigerating overnight.

== See also ==
- Summer pudding
- Tiffin (confectionery)
