= Tinginys =

Lithuanian dessert

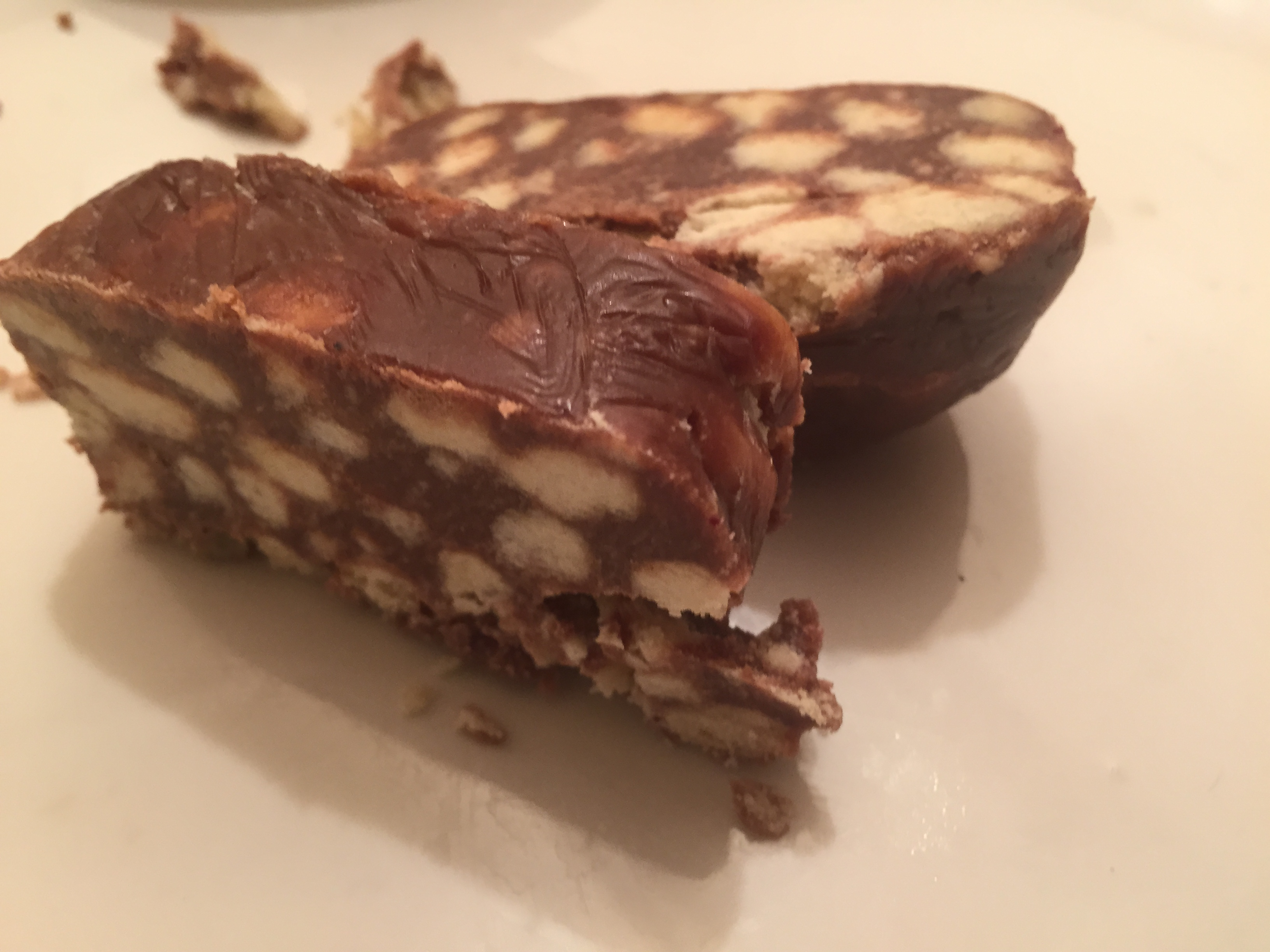
- Type: Dessert
- Place of origin: Lithuania
- Main ingredients: Cocoa, crackers or biscuits, condensed milk, butter

Tinginys is a popular dessert in Lithuania similar to chocolate salamis. The dish is typically prepared with biscuits or crackers, cocoa, butter, sugar and solidified milk.

== History ==
In 1888, production of chocolate and other products arrived to Kaunas, situated in the south-centre of Lithuania. Due to this, artisans started to elaborate upon new recipes with chocolate, such as chocolate and biscuits and chocolate with raisins or hazelnuts. In Lithuania different types of hazelnuts are available because there are a great variety of forests, so they are used frequently. Lithuanians also began to make cognac sweetened with chocolate and created new liquors that utilized chocolate. More elaborate recipes were created, such as the sweet called "tinginys," which means "lazy man".

In 1967 a woman accidentally created the recipe; she tried to cook chocolate but added too much sugar, which liquified the mixture into a syrup. To remedy this, the woman tried to make the flavour less strong by adding some biscuits, so she broke them into pieces, mixed them with the syrup and when it cooled, the first Tinginys (also known as "Rocky road") was created. Later modifications occurred, such as letting the mixture cool down and rolling it on a plastic bag, and then cutting it into pieces. People decided to call it "lazy man" because it was very easy and quick to prepare.

== In contemporary times ==
Today, tinginys is sometimes produced using less expensive ingredients and with even easier methods. Cocoa is sometimes used in place of chocolate, and condensed milk is sometimes used in place of boiled, solidified milk.

== See also ==
- List of desserts
- Lithuanian cuisine
- Chocolate salami
