= Arroz a la valenciana =

Latin American and Philippine rice dish

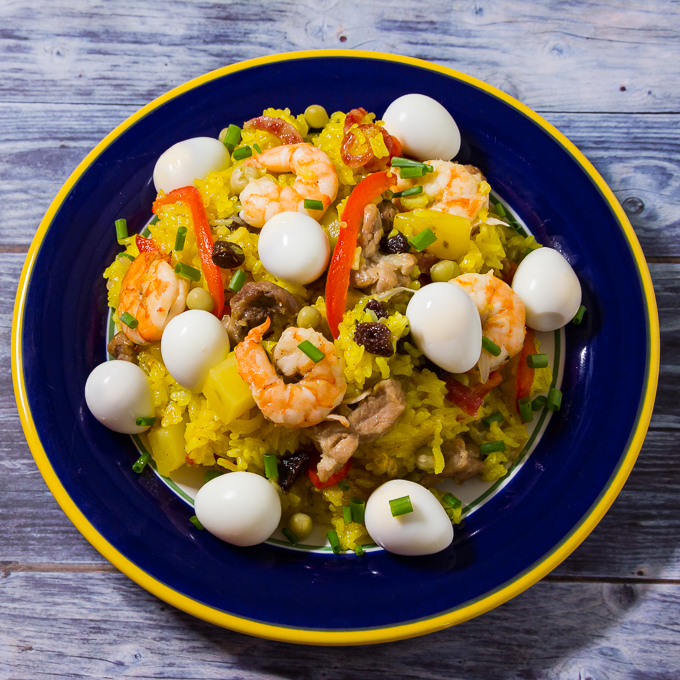
- Filipino-style arroz a la valenciana
- Alternative names: Arroz à valenciana, arroz valenciana
- Course: Meal
- Place of origin: Latin America, Philippines (ultimately from Valencian Community, Spain)
- Main ingredients: rice · saffron, annatto or turmeric to color · seafood · meats · vegetables

Arroz a la valenciana ('Valencian-style rice'; in Valencian, arròs a la valenciana) or Valencian rice is a name for a multitude of rice dishes from diverse cuisines of the world, which originate from the rice-cooking tradition of the Valencian Community, in eastern Spain.

Paella is one of the recipes derived from a generic method to cook rice developed in the old kingdom of Valencia, now applied to the modern variants of arroz a la valenciana. The method of preparing Valencian rice has been practiced since the colonial era and can be found in Argentine, Colombian, Cuban, Filipino, Nicaraguan, Portuguese, Uruguayan and Venezuelan cuisines. On the other hand, Valencian paella, did not emerge until the late 19th century, among the peasants of the Horta of Valencia. In Spain, when a paella has other ingredients that are not "properly Valencian" it receives the informal, popular, and derogatory name of arroz con cosas ('rice with stuff').

Although there is a wide variety of arroz a la valenciana recipes, they all share a few commonalities. For example, typically, the rice is dry (without broth) and colored by various spices (originally saffron). Additionally it is common to include vegetables, meats and seafood.

== History ==
Although rice was probably grown in Valencia before the Moorish era, it was the Arabs who furthered its cultivation and diversification of use. This is reflected in both the medieval cookbooks of Christians and Muslims, in which it is evident that they were already seasoning their rice with saffron in this era; an example of this is arròs en Cassola al forn by Mestre Robert (16th century).

As time went by, the culture of rice became important in Valencia, (Note: Historically, the rice tradition occurs throughout the Spanish Levantine area, that is, Andalusia, Catalonia, Murcia and Valencia, although the way of preparing it differs in each place. In the rest of the Spanish regions, the use of rice would be uncommon until well into the 20th century.) with different recipes that added vegetables and meats. In the colonial era, Arroz a la valenciana spread to Spanish colonies in the new world, to countries as far apart as Nicaragua or the Philippines. The recipe has been adapted over time to include new ingredients and to cater to American taste preferences.

The first written mention of Arroz a la valenciana is found in a manuscript from the 18th century: Avisos y instrucciones per lo principiant cuyiner by the Franciscan friar Josep Orri. Shortly afterwards, in 1780 Friar Gerónimo de San Pelayo published a cookbook in Mexico City about Arroz a la valenciana. Additionally, in another Mexican cookbook called New and Simple Art of Cooking (1836) by Antonia Carrillo, there is a Arroz a la valenciana recipe that includes green chiles and saffron. The dish also appears in a cookbook published in La Habana in 1862.

José Castro and Serrano commented that no province knows how to cook rice like Valencia. During a religious event in 1889 in Bergara, Spain, they served the guests Arroz a la valenciana. In his General Dictionary of cooking from 1892, Ángel Muro included a recipe for Arroz a la valenciana to pay homage to the "country of rice". In the 1890s the term arroz a la paella ('in a frying pan') began to be used as synonymous with Arroz a la valenciana. In 1903, the French chef Auguste Escoffier dedicated a few pages to riz valenciennes in his first publication of Le Guide Cullinaire.

== Arroz a la valenciana by country ==
=== Bolivian cuisine ===
In Bolivia, arroz a la valenciana is a very common dish that includes chicken, sometimes chorizo, and a variety of vegetables like peas, onion, tomatoes, green beans (string beans), carrots as well as potatoes from a variety of local imilla. The color of the rice comes from the use of paprika or saffron, and red chilli pepper.

=== Chamorro cuisine ===
The recipe for arroz a la valenciana made its way to the Mariana Islands (formerly part of the Spanish East Indies) during the Spanish colonial era. Chamorro people know it as balensiåna and season it with achiote.

=== Chilean cuisine ===
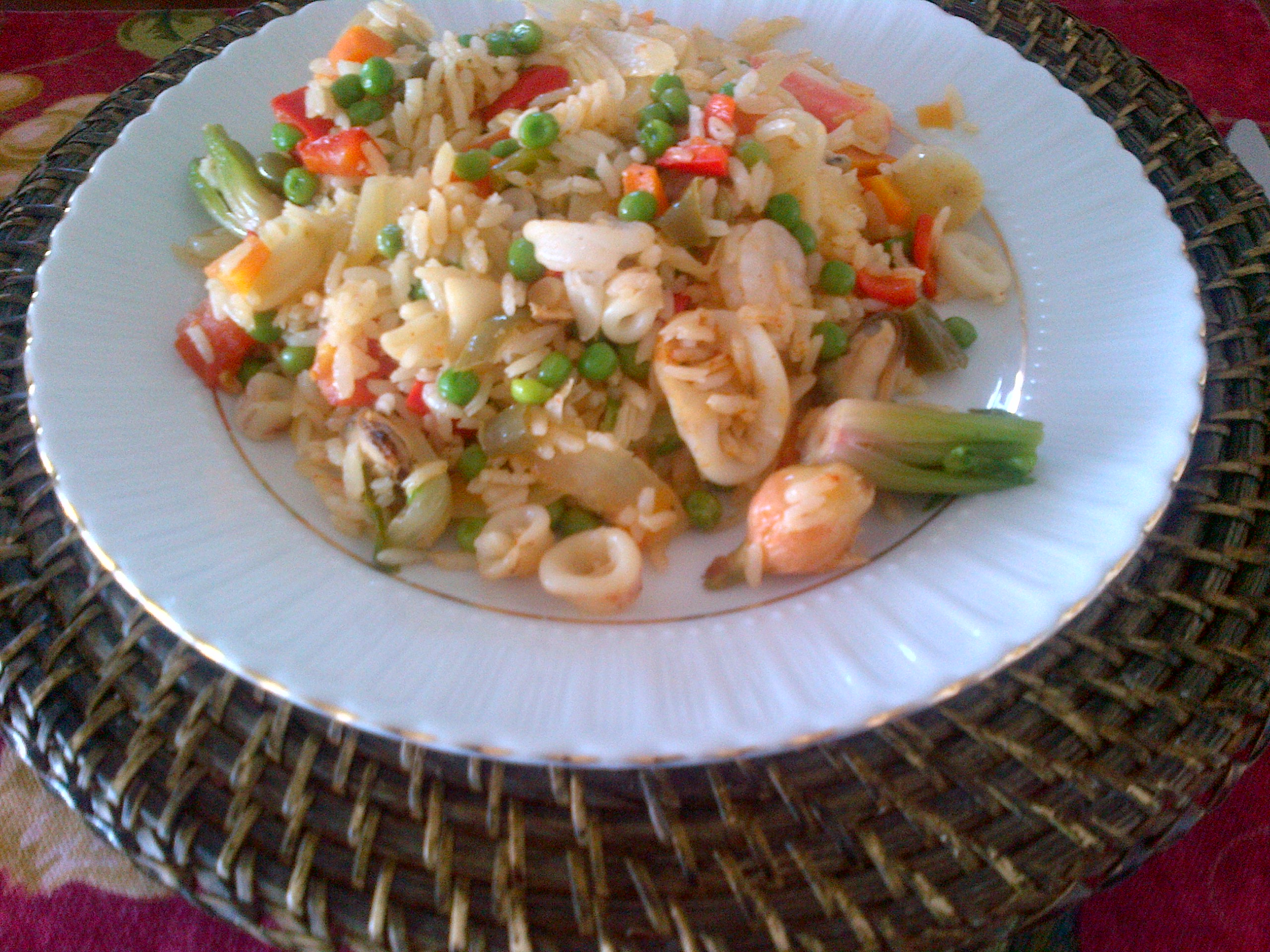
Chilean-style Valencian rice

The Chilean style of preparing arroz a la valenciana differs in its use of curry or turmeric to color the rice, although occasionally it is prepared with saffron as in the original Spanish recipe. Sometimes it is called "Chilean paella", and contains primarily an assortment of seafood: clams, shrimp (prawns), Chilean mussels, and clams. Ingredients can be adjusted to the taste profile of each location, and may include sausages or chicken. When using only vegetables, it is referred to as "arroz a la jardinera".

=== Colombian cuisine ===
Arroz a la valenciana is a typical coastal dish in Colombia. It usually includes pork or chicken, alongside fish and seafood, and is mainly seasoned with saffron.

=== Filipino cuisine ===
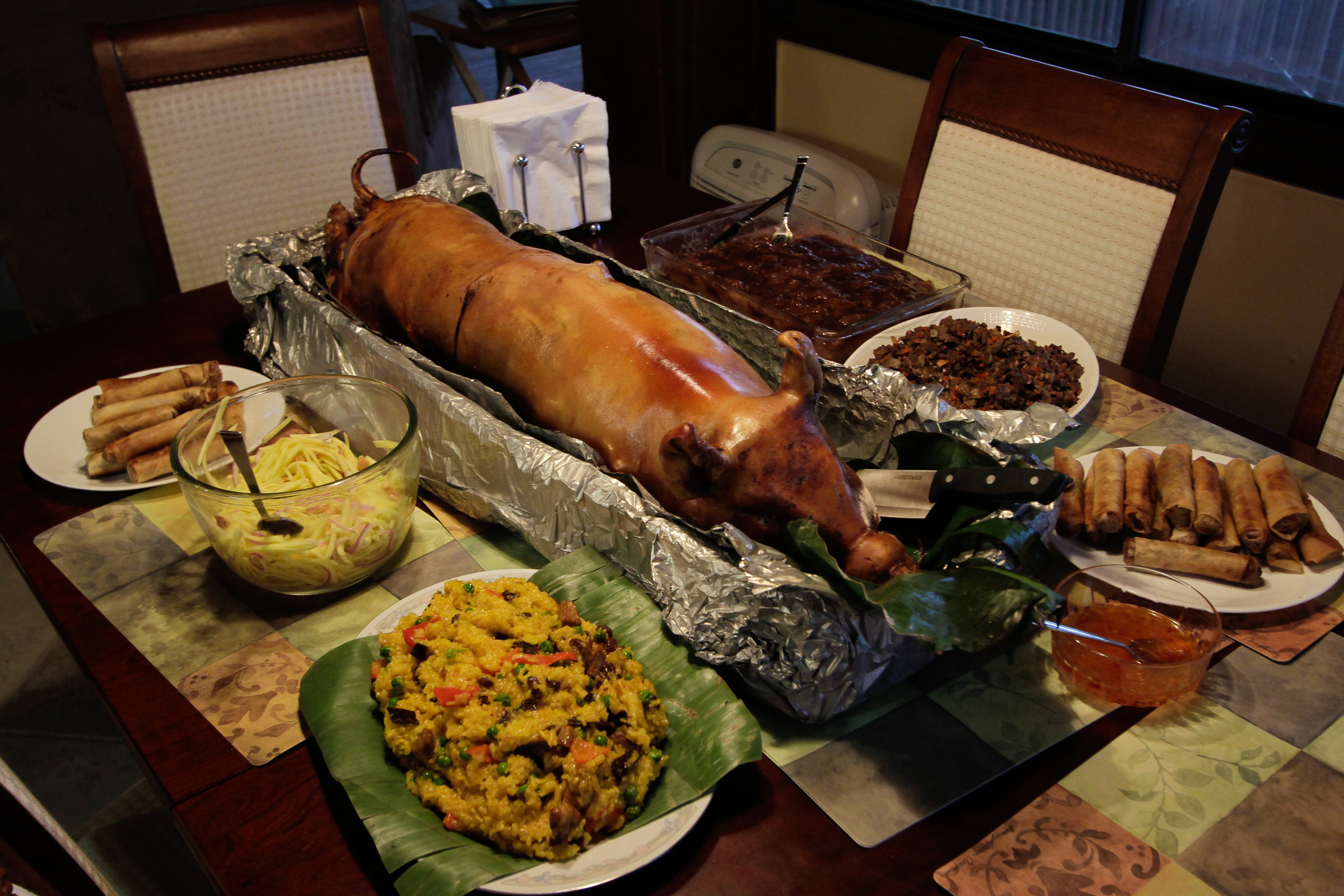
Filipino arroz valenciana (bottom left) served as part of a typical traditional Christmas Eve dinner (noche buena)

In the Philippines, arroz a la valenciana is usually known simply as arroz valenciana (Tagalog: aros balensiyana). It is common in the regional cuisines of the Tagalog, Hiligaynon and Negrense people. It is usually regarded as a subtype of a class of Filipino dishes known as paelya (derived from the Valencian paella with influences from pre-colonial adaptations of biryani). Paelya tends to refer to the dishes with more expensive ingredients, while arroz valenciana refers to dishes with simpler ingredients, leading to it being dubbed as the "paella of the poor".

It is traditionally served during the Christmas noche buena as well as in fiestas (patronal festivals) and other special occasions. In contrast to Spanish and Latin American versions, it is typically made with local glutinous rice varieties that fall within the class termed malagkít (“sticky”). The vegetables vary from one place to another, including onions, tomatoes, bell pepper, green peas, carrots, and parsley. The meat component is usually chicken and chorizo de Bilbao (a Filipino type of sausage), but numerous other types of protein can be used or added, ranging from boiled eggs, pork, beef, duck, and seafood. In addition, coconut milk – an indispensable ingredient in the country – may be used in the cooking process. Like other types of Filipino paelya, arroz valenciana rarely uses saffron. Instead it characteristically uses achuete (anatto), luyang diláw (turmeric), or kasubhâ (safflower) to add color to the rice.

Like in some parts of Latin America, the dish may also have alcohol. Common spirits include white wine or beer, while butter is sometimes used instead of oil.

=== Nicaraguan cuisine ===
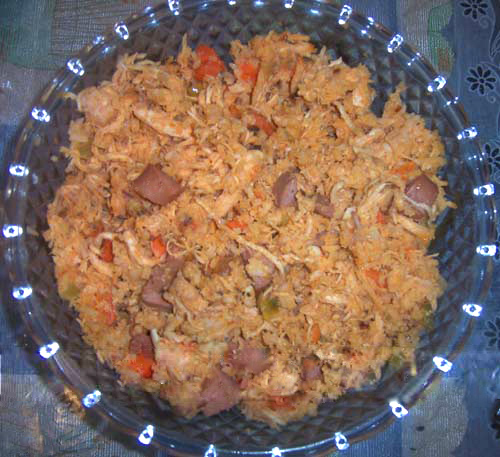
Nicaraguan-style Valencian rice

The Nicaraguan recipe of arroz a la valenciana is different from the Spanish original, since it includes butter instead of oil, onion, tomato sauce, chiltoma (sweet pepper), and other vegetables according to the preferences of the chef. The meats used are usually chicken, ham or choricitos. It is one of the typical small plates of rice in Nicaragua. At times it is called "arroz de piñata", as it is often served during children's birthday celebrations colloquialy called "piñatas". It is usually prepared with beer, along with white wine.

=== Portuguese cuisine ===
Arroz à valenciana is found throughout all of Portugal, and includes many types of meat (chicken, pork, sausages) and seafood or squid, as well as diverse vegetables such as peas (sweet peas) and red peppers. The color of the rice depends on the use of saffron. Another common spice used in this version of arroz a la valenciana is garlic. Frequently it includes white wine as well.

=== Salvadoran cuisine ===
In El Salvador, arroz a la valenciana usually includes hard-boiled eggs and several pieces of chicken, like the breast, gizzard or liver. A variety of vegetables are added, like onion, peas (sweet peas), sweet corn (maize), or carrots. Curry or paprika are common spices.

== See also ==
- List of chicken dishes
- List of rice dishes

Related dishes

- Arroz junto
- Arroz con pollo
- Arroz negro
- Bringhe
- Fideuà
- Jambalaya
- Paelya
- Pilaf
- Risotto
