= Paelya =

Philippine rice dish

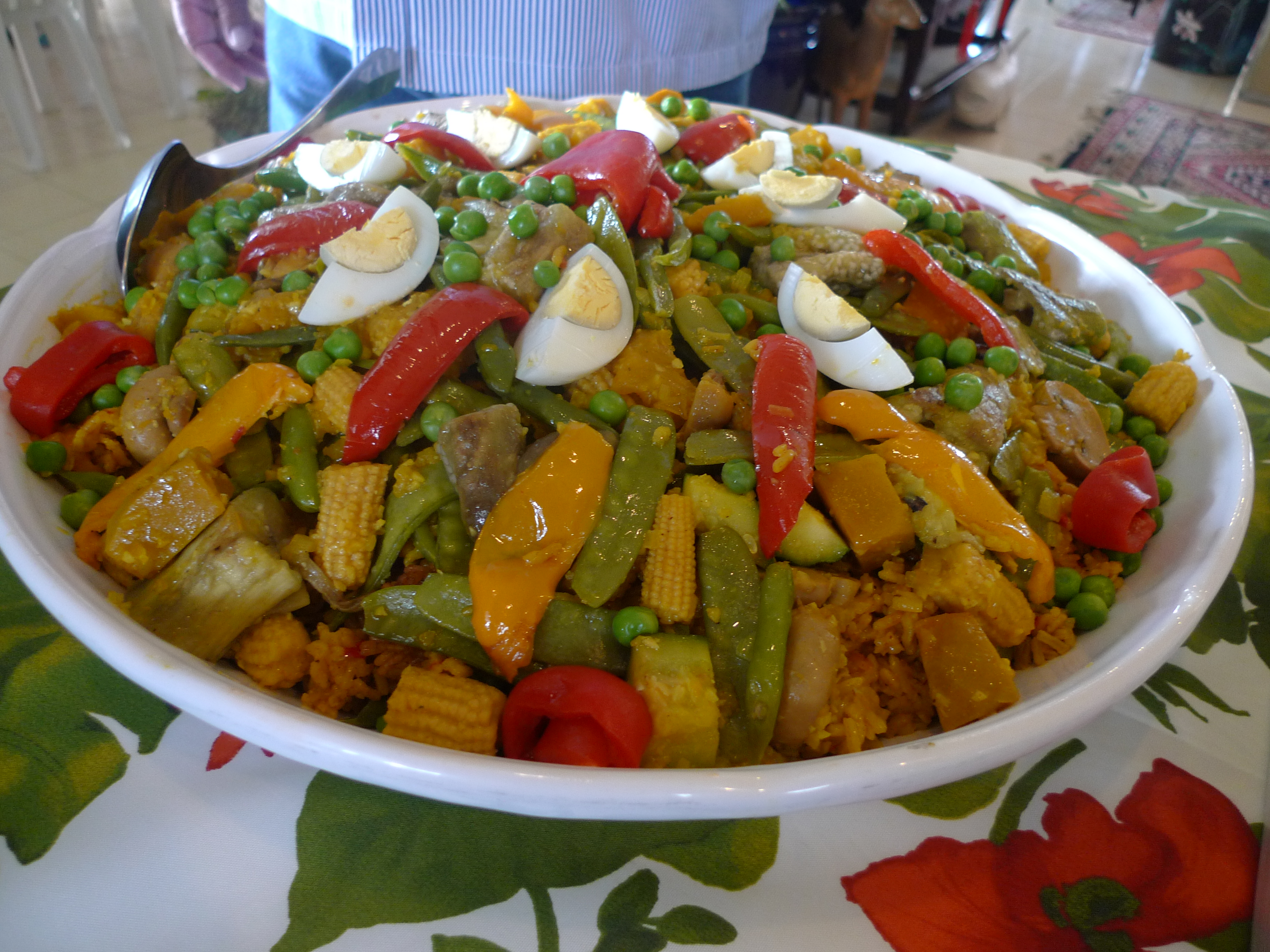
- Paelya from Tagaytay
- Alternative names: paella
- Course: Main dish
- Place of origin: Philippines
- Serving temperature: Hot
- Main ingredients: glutinous rice, rice
- Variations: arroz a la valenciana, bringhe, paella negra

Paelya (Tagalog: [pɐˈʔɛːl.jɐ]) or paella (Spanish) is a Philippine rice dish adapted from the Valencian paella. However, it differs significantly in its use of native glutinous rice (malagkít), giving it a soft and sticky texture, unlike the al dente texture favoured in Spanish paella. It is also characteristically topped with sliced eggs. Filipino paelya does not use saffron, but is instead coloured with atsuete (anatto), luyang diláw (turmeric), or kasubhâ (safflower).

Paelya is also a general term for similar dishes in the Philippines, regardless of the ingredients used. It includes arroz a la valenciana (usually made with chicken and chorizo de bilbao), bringhe (made with coconut milk), and paella negra (made with squid ink).

== Etymology ==
The name is derived from Spanish paella, but is pronounced with lleismo. Like most occurrences of the ll digraph in Philippine languages, it is pronounced with [lj] rather than the Spanish [ʎ]. Hence the nativized spelling of "paelya".

== Description ==
Filipino paelya is prepared similarly to its ancestors, the Valencian paella and the Latin American arroz a la valenciana, but consists of more indigenous ingredients. Instead of arroz bomba, paelya favors high-quality, local heirloom rice varieties, like Ifugao tinawon, which has similar characteristics to arroz bomba. Imported long-grain rice (like jasmine rice) are also used. This is mixed with glutinous rice (malagkít) in varying ratios, ranging from a fourth of the regular rice to equal parts, depending on how sticky the final product is desired to be.

In place of saffron, paelya uses annatto (atsuete), turmeric (luyang dilaw), or safflower (kasubhâ). Sometimes, a knot of pandán (screwpine) leaves is added, infusing the dish with a vanilla-like scent. Some variations will also use tomato sauce in the sofrito (ginisa) to color and flavor the dish.

Meat paelya typically use chicken, pork, beef, and smoked spicy sausages. The sausages used in paelya can be any of the native smoked lóngganisa, but it is usually chorizo de bilbao (which despite its name, is a native Filipino sausage). Seafood paelya typically include mussels (tahóng), blue crab (alimasag), large prawns (hipon), clams (kabibì), and squid (pusít). The meat and seafood versions are commonly mixed together. The typical vegetables and spices used include bell peppers, onions, garlic, tomatoes, ginger, carrots, green peas, black pepper, scallions, paprika, and raisins. It is usually garnished with calamansi and sliced hard-boiled eggs. Other native condiments and ingredients can also be added, like lemongrass (tanglád), patís (fish sauce), and bagoóng alamáng (shrimp paste).

Paelya is usually cooked in a paellera, a shallow and wide pan with two handles. Though it can also be cooked in a kawalì (wok). Due to the complexity of the dish and its ingredients, paelya is rarely served in everyday meals. It is considered luxurious, reserved for special occasions. Paelya is commonly served on Christmas Eve during the Nochebuena (Christmas dinner).

== Variants ==
Because the dish is easy to modify, there are numerous variants of paelya, depending on the ingredients at hand. They include the following:

=== Arroz valenciana ===
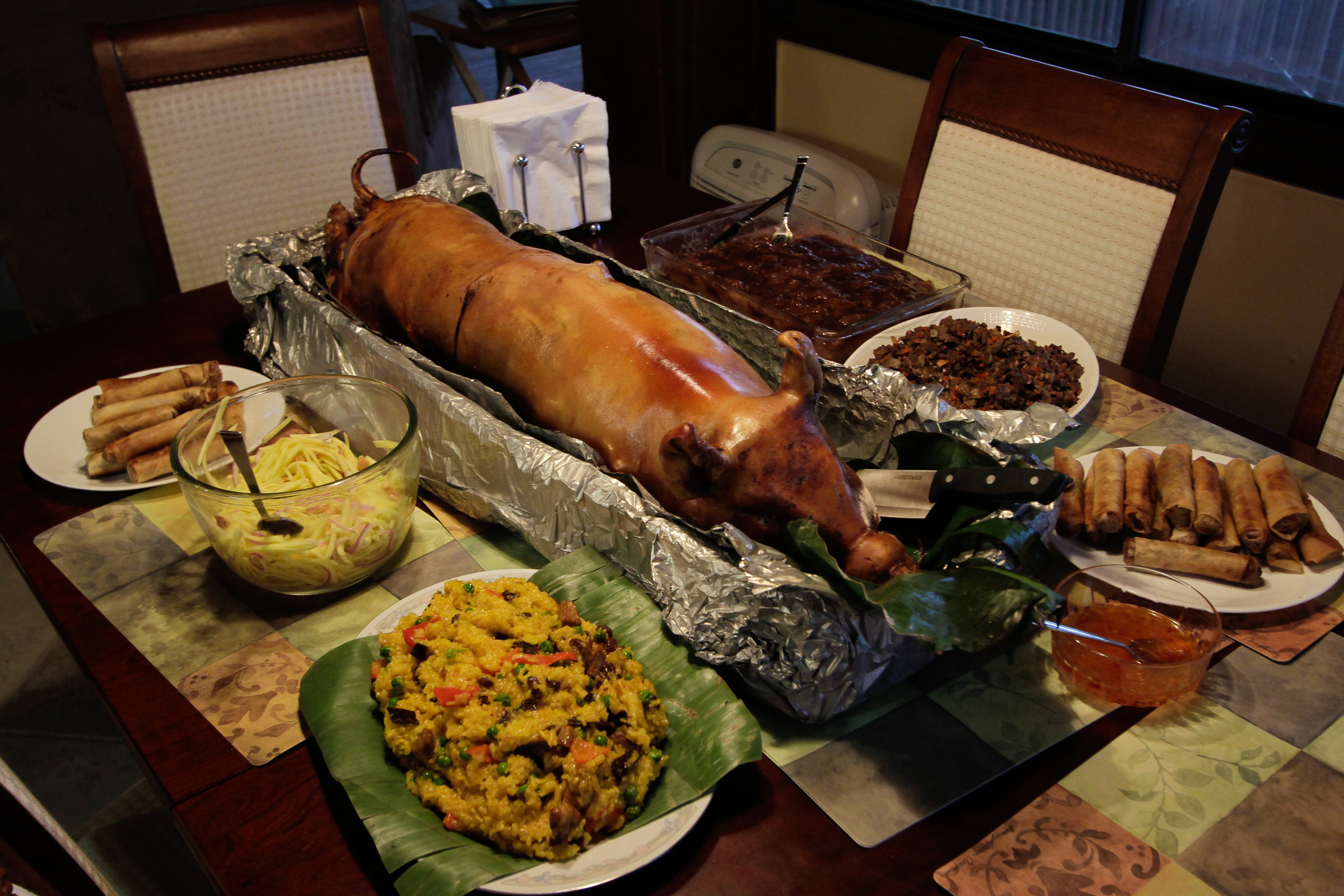
Arroz valenciana (bottom left) served as part of a typical traditional Christmas Eve dinner (noche buena)

Arroz valenciana or arroz a la valenciana is sometimes regarded as a separate dish. It originates from the Latin American adaptation of paella. But like other Filipino paelyas, it uses glutinous rice. It primarily uses chicken and chorizo de bilbao, but can also include pork or beef.

=== Biringi ===
Biringi (also known as bringhi, beringhe, biringhe, biringye, biringyi or kalame manuc) is a paelya variant from the province of Pampanga. It is similar to the original Valencian dish, but uses rice and glutinous rice mixtures cooked in gata (coconut milk) with saffron or turmeric (ange in Kapampangan), giving it a distinct flavour and colour. It typically uses chicken, along with bell peppers, green peas, carrots, raisins, and chorizo de bilbao. However, it can also be made with seafood and other meats. It is also characteristically topped with sliced boiled eggs. It is sometimes cooked in banana leaves for added aroma.

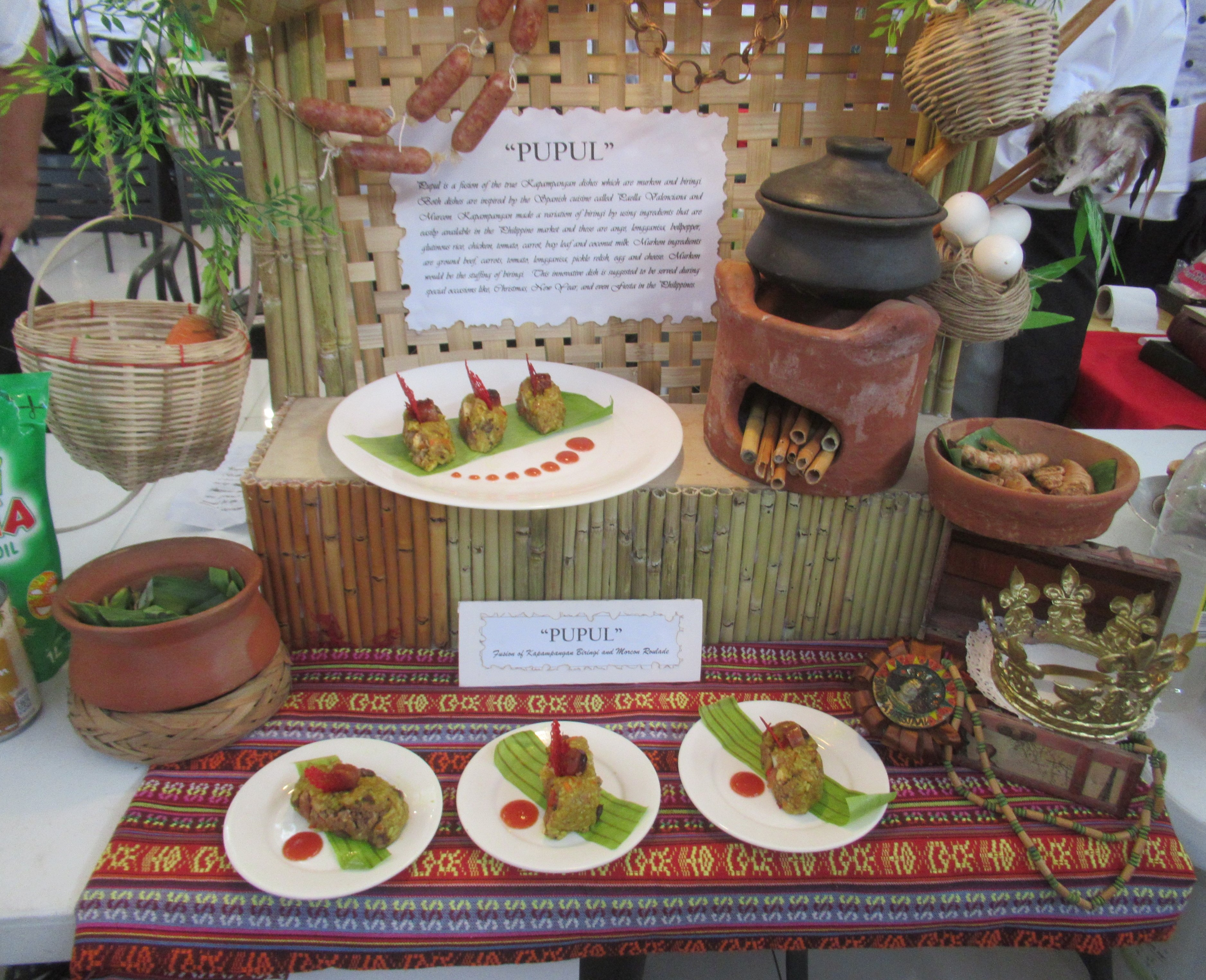
"Pulpul" is Kapampangan Bringhe-Morcon fusion.

Biringi is precolonial in origin, and while the name is a cognate of those for South Asian biryani dishes, it has since merged with the Spanish paella. The original version made without the chorizo, eggs, or other paelya ingredients is differentiated as nasing biringye, which is more similar to the nasi briyani of Malaysia and Singapore.

=== Paella al horno con queso ===
A baked variant of paelya topped with cheese, chicken breasts, and roasted bell peppers.

=== Paella de adobo ===
A relatively modern adaptation, developed by Alba Restaurante Español, a notable Spanish-Filipino restaurant in Manila established in 1954. It is a fusion dish, combining Spanish paella with Filipino adobo.

=== Paella parillada ===
This variant, named for the word for “grill”, is topped with grilled or barbecued meat or seafood.

=== Paella negra ===
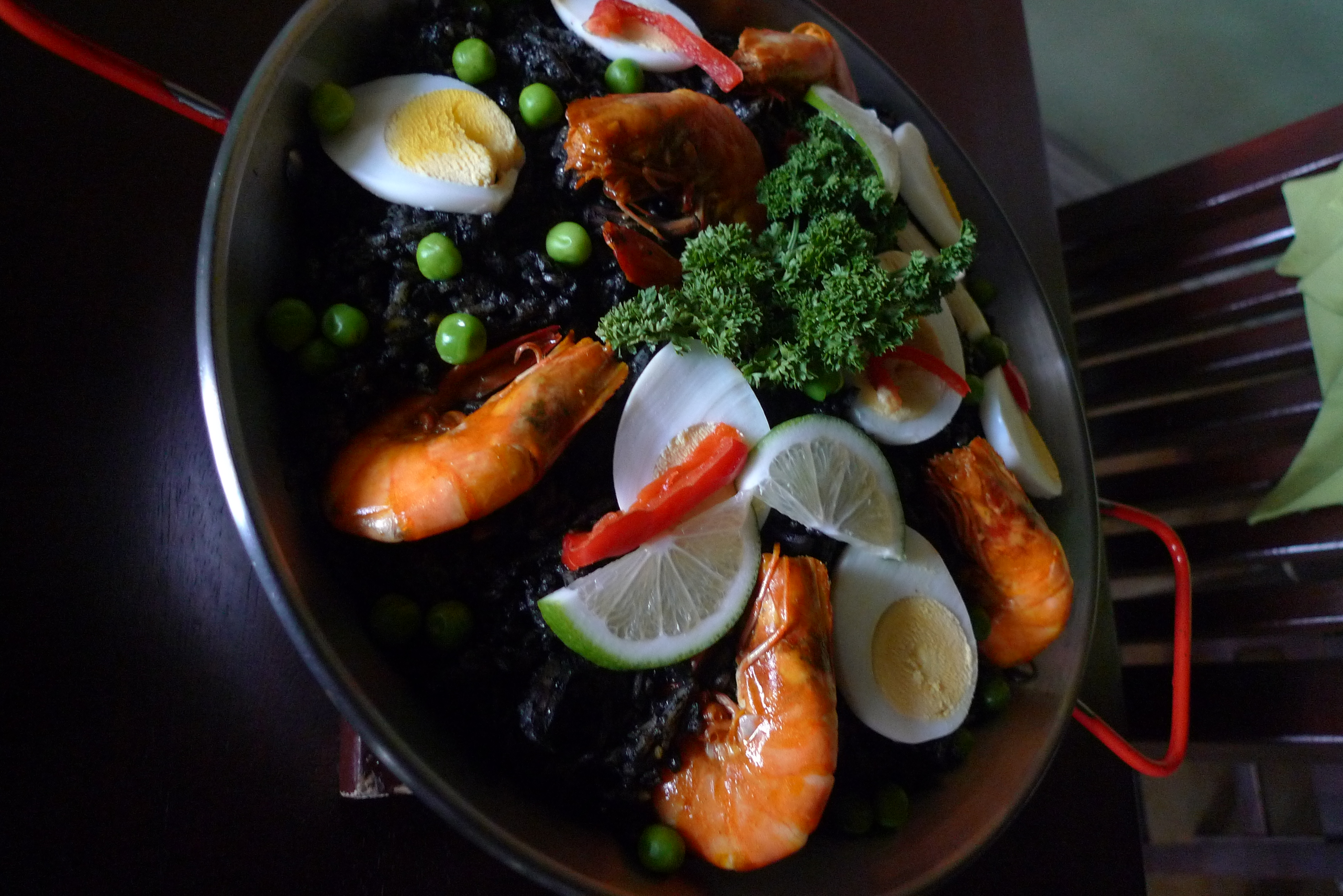
Filipino paella negra

Paella negra, also called arroz negro, is a variant that uses squid ink and calamari. The dish is characteristically black, hence the name. It is most similar to the Valencian and Catalan dish arròs negre, but like other Filipino paelyas, it uses glutinous rice.

=== Paella sotanghon ===
A Chinese-influenced variant of paelya using glass noodles (sótanghon) instead of rice.

=== Paella à la Cordillera ===
A giant “Paella ala Cordillera” was prepared by 10 chefs and 40 culinary students from the University of Baguio. The Baguio Paelya's ingredients include 100 kilos Pasil's traditional “chong-ak” rice a variety of “unoy” with sweet, herbal aroma (recognized by Slow Food), mixed with native ingredients like Benguet's 3 kilos oyster mushroom, 5 kilos shiitake, 10 kilos broccoli, 10 kilos carrots, 10 kilos green bean, 10 kilos cauliflower, 2 kilos flat parsley, 5 kilos lemon, 30 canned tomatoes, 30 kilos onions, 10 kilos garlic, 40 kilos red and green bell peppers, 40 kilos native chicken, 10 kilos salt, 15 kilos "kini-ing" chicken from Bakun, Benguet, or "kini-ing" smoked pork ("Etag"-Igorot or "Kinuday"-Ibaloi) from native black pigs,10 kilos “pinunog” (Kiangan, Ifugao) and “pinuneg” (Benguet), 20 kilograms Abra longaniza, 2 kilos button mushroom, 4 kilos Bouillon cube, a kilo of paella spice and 15 liters of olive oil.

== See also ==
- Arroz con pollo
- Arroz negro
- Fideuà
- Kiampong
- Kuning
- Morisqueta tostada
- Pancit choca
- Pancit palabok
- Pilaf
