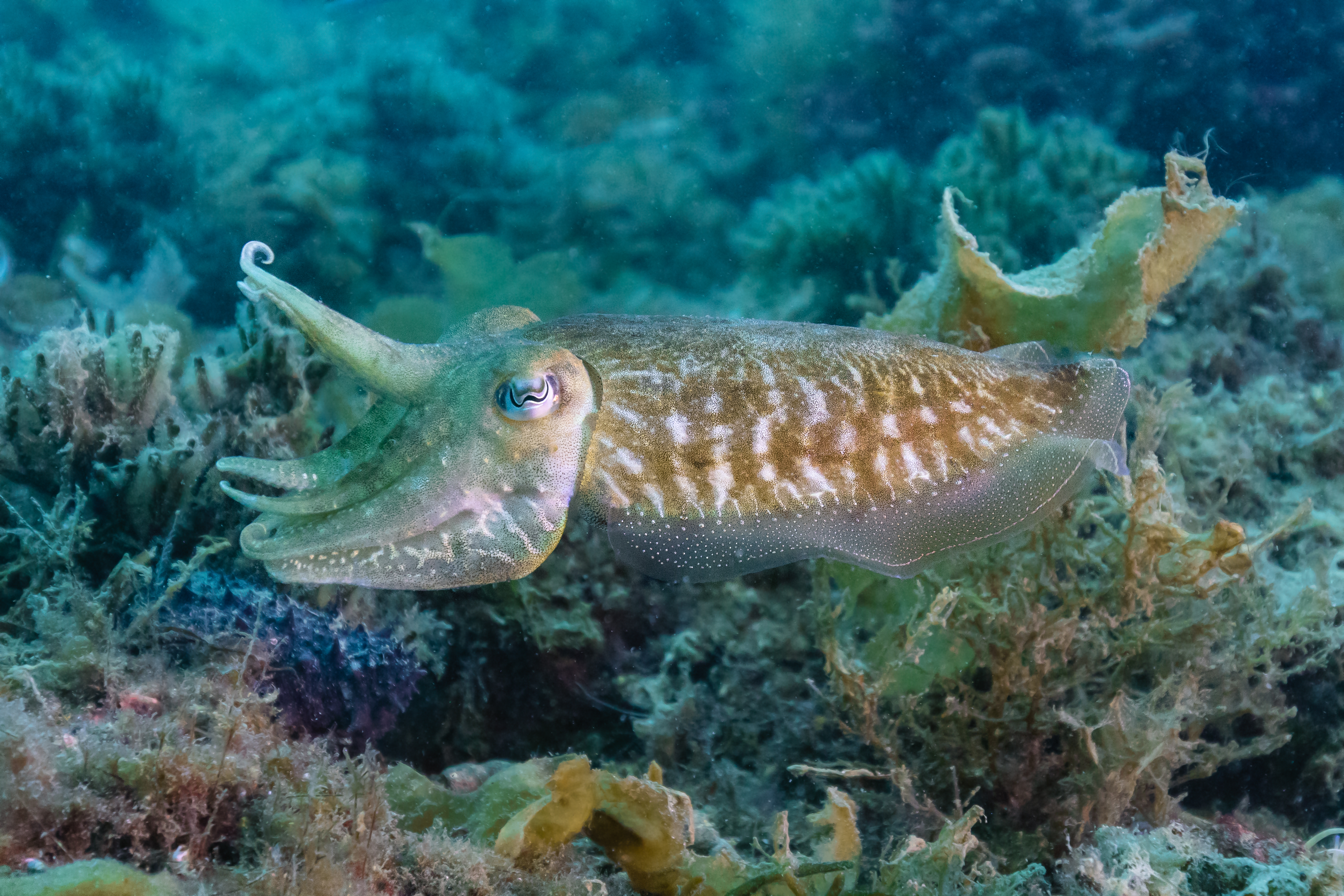
- Common cuttlefish in Arrábida Natural Park, Portugal

Conservation status
- Least Concern (IUCN 3.1)

Scientific classification
- Kingdom: Animalia
- Phylum: Mollusca
- Class: Cephalopoda
- Order: Sepiida
- Family: Sepiidae
- Genus: Sepia
- Subgenus: Sepia
- Species: S. officinalis

Binomial name
- Sepia officinalis Linnaeus, 1758

Synonyms
- Sepia rugosa Bowdich, 1822; Sepia vicellius Gray, 1849; Sepia zebrina Risso, 1854; Sepia filliouxi Lafont, 1869; ?Sepia fischeri Lafont, 1871; Sepia officinalis mediterranea Ninni, 1884; ?Sepia veranyi P. Fischer in Lagatu, 1888

= Common cuttlefish =

Species of cephalopod

The common cuttlefish or European common cuttlefish (Sepia officinalis) is one of the largest and best-known cuttlefish species. They are a migratory species that spend the summer and spring inshore for spawning and then move to depths of 100–200 metres (330–660 ft) during autumn and winter. They grow to 49 centimetres (19 in) in mantle length and 4 kilograms (8.8 lb) in weight. Animals from subtropical seas are smaller and rarely exceed 30 centimetres (12 in) in mantle length.

The common cuttlefish is native to at least the Mediterranean Sea, North Sea, and Baltic Sea, although subspecies have been proposed as far south as South Africa. It lives on sand and mud seabeds and it can tolerate brackish water conditions.

== Taxonomy ==
It is unknown where the type specimen of S. officinalis was collected, as the location is given simply as "Oceano". It is deposited in the Linnean Society of London.

Sepia officinalis jurujubai Oliveira, 1940, originally described as a subspecies of the common cuttlefish, is a junior synonym of Sepioteuthis sepioidea.

== Description ==
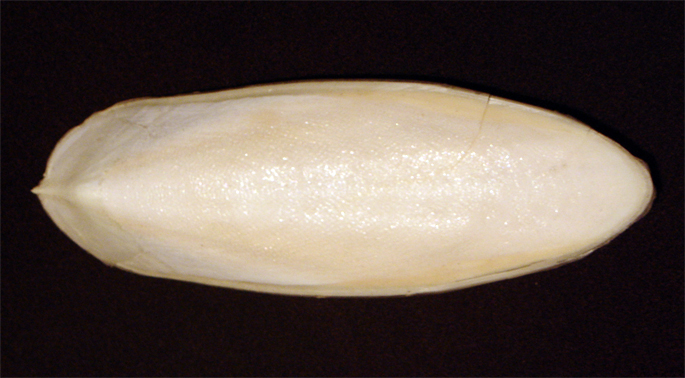
The cuttlebone of a cuttlefish. This is the largest hard part of a cuttlefish, maintaining the rigidity of its body.

The common cuttlefish is one of the largest species of cuttlefish with a mantle length reaching up to 45 cm (18 in) and a mass of 4 kg (8.8 lb) on a presumed male, although this is for an exceptional specimen in temperate waters; specimens in subtropical waters rarely surpass a mantle length of 30 cm (12 in) and 2 kg (4.4 lb) in mass. The mantle houses the reproductive and digestive tracts of the cuttlefish and is also home to an internal shell called the cuttlebone, located on the dorsal side of the animal. The common cuttlefish has two highly developed eyes, eight arms which are located around the mouth and are used to hold and manipulate prey, two specialized feeding tentacles which are used to ambush prey, and a beak housing a radula used in breaking down and consuming their (often armored) prey. Cuttlefish move by undulating fins on the periphery of their mantle, but when startled they often jet away using a siphon, inking in the process.

Cuttlefish are well known for their unmatched camouflaging abilities which are possible due a variety of specialized cells; pigmented chromatophore organs, light scattering leucophores, and structurally reflecting iridophores in their skin work in concert to conceal the cuttlefish in its environment. They not only are able to swiftly change their colour and patterns, but can also use peripheral muscles to change the texture of their skin. Their camouflaging abilities are categorized into four main types including mottle, stipple, uniform, and disruptive. Cuttlefish possess these camouflaging abilities from before hatching; a cuttlefish can visibly manipulate its chromatophores from within its clear-membraned egg.

== Ecology ==
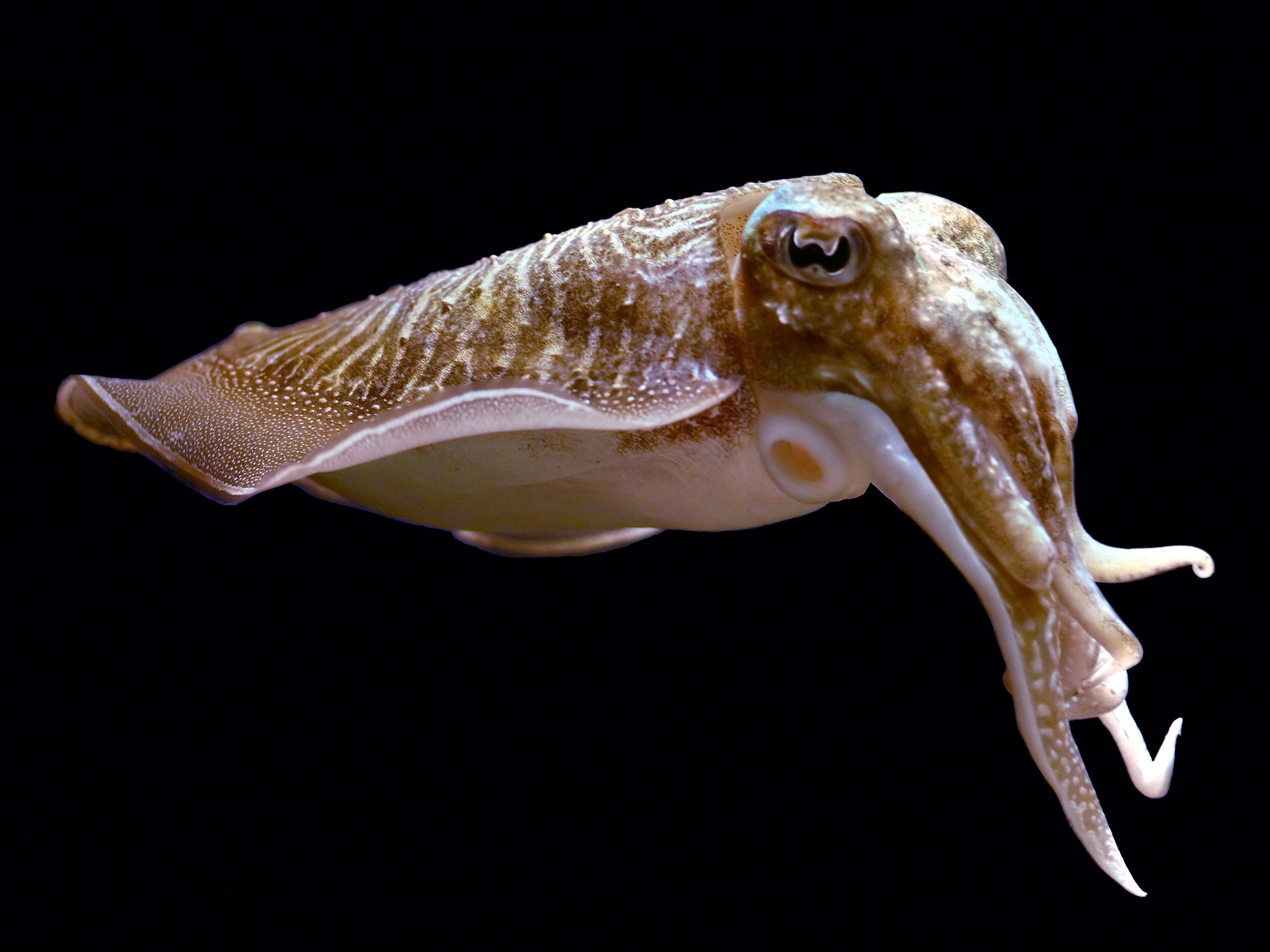
The common cuttlefish is shallow water demersal, ambush-hunting coleoid.

=== Diet ===
During the day, most cuttlefish can be found buried below the substrate and fairly inactive. At night however, they are actively searching for prey and can ambush them from under the substrate. Cuttlefish are carnivorous and eat a variety of organisms including crustaceans (crabs and shrimp), small demersal fish, molluscs (clams and snails), and sometimes other cuttlefish which is more commonly seen when the abundance of other prey is low.

A 2008 study on S. officinalis revealed that cuttlefish embryos, if visually exposed to a certain species of prey (e.g. crabs), will hunt primarily for that prey in later life. S. officinalis usually prefer shrimp to crabs, but when the embryos were exposed to crabs and the embryos had hatched, the young cuttlefish switched preferences and proceeded to hunt the crabs more often than the shrimp.

=== Life history ===
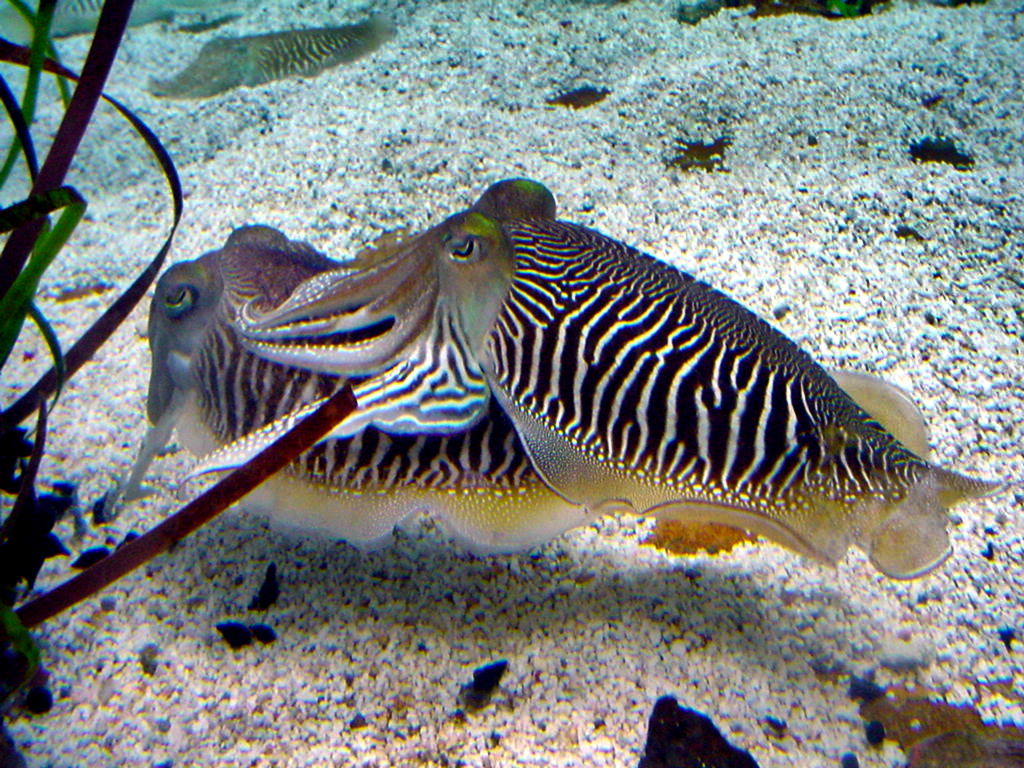
The male cuttlefish (right) solicits the female for mating.

Cuttlefish reach sexual maturity between 14 and 18 months of age. During breeding season, which occurs during spring, summer, and sometimes early autumn, large gatherings of male cuttlefish will display a highly contrasting black and white zebra pattern on their mantle to attract females and females will display a uniform grey colour to indicate they are ready to mate. Cuttlefish males carry up to 1400 spermatophores to the female and the female carries between 150 and 4000 eggs depending on her body mass. The female attaches the egg mass to seaweed, shells, or other substrates to prevent it from drifting away; the eggs incubate for 30 or 90 days, depending on temperature, until they hatch into miniature versions of the adults. Cuttlefish live up to 2 years of age; a large number of them die after spawning.

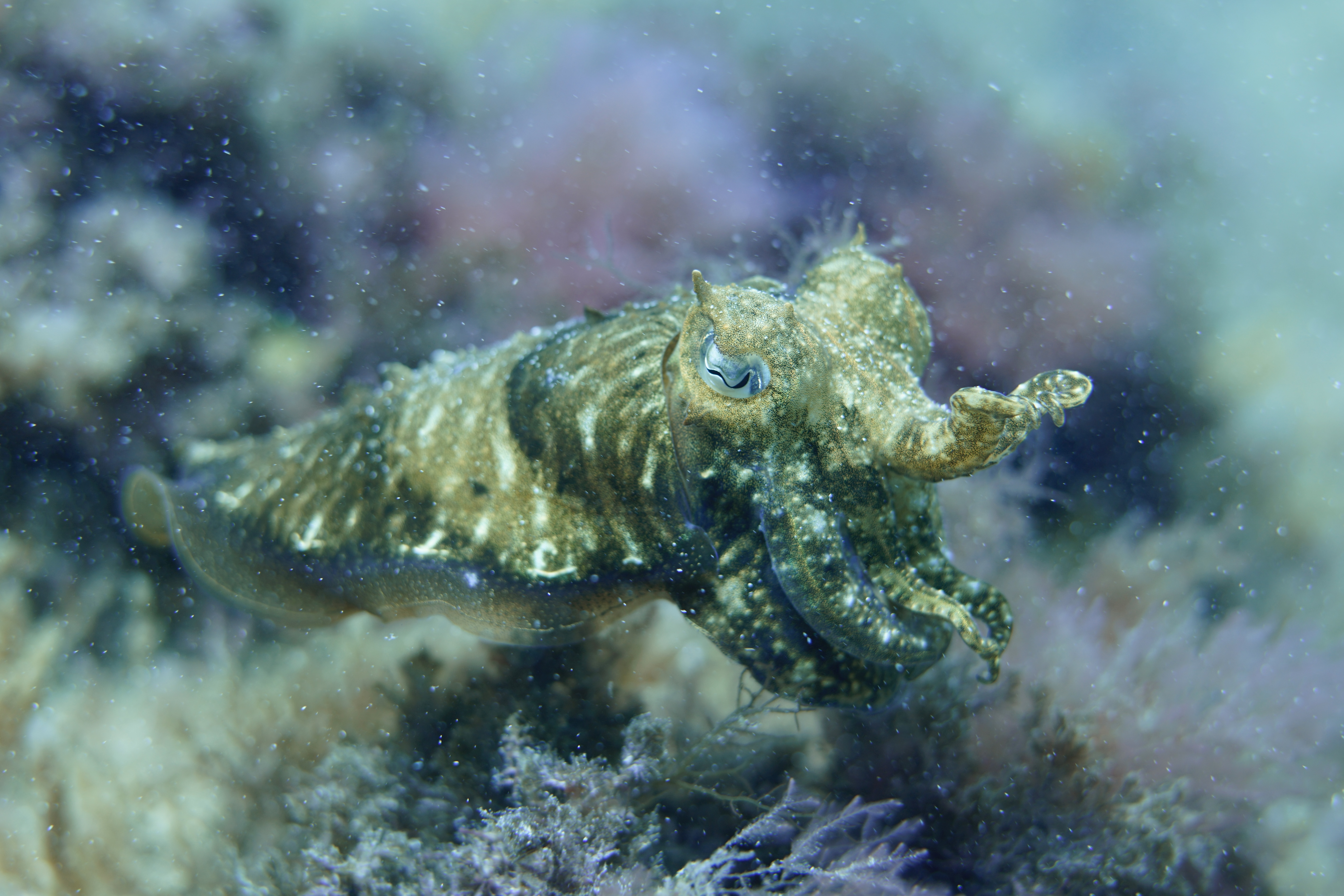
Camouflaged common cuttlefish

Cuttlefish have many predators including sharks, coastal dolphins, seals, large fish such as sparids, and cephalopods which includes other cuttlefish. They have a number of anti-predator adaptations; their primary means is camouflage, sitting concealed while a predator passes them by. If located, a cuttlefish will jet away using its siphon, and will often ink; a cuttlefish has a variety of ink types that it can use depending on its situation.

The egg masses of the common cuttlefish are also attacked and consumed by predators; an experiment determined that a variety of marine invertebrates, including the murex sea snails, european lobster, rock crabs, sea urchins, Squilla mantis, and sea stars ate common cuttlefish egg masses.

== Uses ==
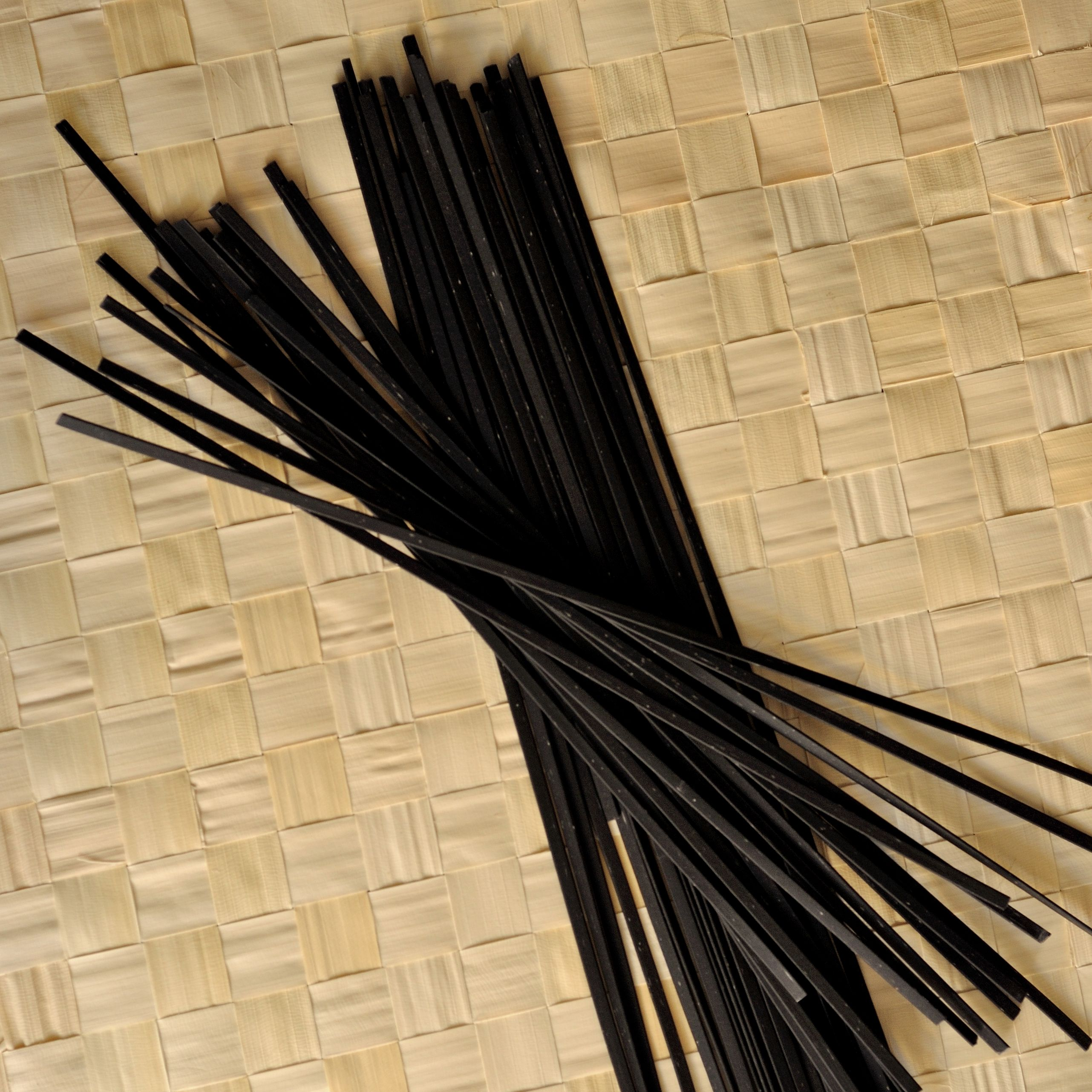
Linguine dyed with cuttlefish ink

Sepia officinalis is a species that is commonly fished in the Mediterranean, including countries like Greece and Spain. Although it is fished extensively and wild stocks in some regions are close to being over-exploited, population numbers are not declining and the species is of Least Concern on the list of threatened species. Cuttlefish in general have many uses, thus they have a large commercial value. Sepia officinalis is a popular food item in its native range, and mediterranean languages have numerous names for cuttlefish. The mantle is the main cut eaten; it is processed into a multitude of dishes after the cuttlebone and guts are removed. The head including the tentacles are also processed into a variety of dishes; the buccal mass including the beak are often removed beforehand.

Cuttlefish ink is believed to have many beneficial health effects including anti-inflammatory, anti-oxidant, antimicrobial, anti-hypertensive, anti-retroviral, and potential anticancer properties. The ink itself is an ingredient in food, staining the dish to a deep black coloration. Another common use for cuttlefish ink is as a pigment; the color sepia is named after the common cuttlefish, and it is extracted from its ink sac.

Cuttlebones are commonly sold for pet parrots because they provide a good source of calcium, help keep a bird's beak trimmed, improve jaw strength, and provide entertainment for the bird. Some reptile species may also take cuttlebones for calcium and enrichment.

== See also ==
- Cuttlebone
- Cephalopod size
- European squid
