= Cephalopod ink =

Dark pigment released by cephalopods

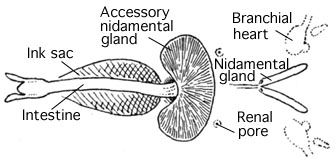
Ventral view of the viscera of Chtenopteryx sicula, showing the specific location of the ink sac

Cephalopod ink is a dark-coloured or luminous ink released into water by most species of cephalopod, usually as an escape mechanism. All cephalopods, with the exception of the Nautilidae and the Cirrina (deep-sea octopuses), are able to release ink to confuse predators.

The ink is released from the ink sacs (located between the gills) and is dispersed more widely when its release is accompanied by a jet of water from the siphon. Its dark colour is caused by its main constituent, melanin. Each species of cephalopod produces slightly differently coloured inks; generally, octopuses produce black ink, squid ink is blue-black, and cuttlefish ink is a shade of brown.

A number of other aquatic molluscs have similar responses to attack, including the gastropod clade known as sea hares.

== Properties and chemistry ==
Cephalopod ink contains a number of chemicals in a variety of different concentrations, depending on the species. However, its main constituents are melanin and mucus. It can also contain, among others, tyrosinase, dopamine, and L-DOPA, as well as small amounts of free amino acids, including taurine, aspartic acid, glutamic acid, alanine, and lysine.

=== Attack protection ===
Inking has been shown to protect species of squids against predatory fish attacks, as well during the capture phase as during the consummatory phase, due to visual and chemical effects of the ink released.

=== Chemical effects ===
Many cephalopod predators (for instance moray eels) have advanced chemosensory systems, and some anecdotal evidence suggests that compounds (such as tyrosinase) found in cephalopod ink can irritate, numb or even deactivate such apparatus. Few controlled experiments have been conducted to substantiate this. Cephalopod ink is nonetheless generally thought to be more sophisticated than a simple "smoke screen"; the ink of a number of squid and cuttlefish has been shown to function as a conspecific chemical alarm. Computer simulations have suggested the melanin deployed by cuttlefish may be particularly effective against the scent receptors of sharks, overwhelming the fishes' narrow but extremely intense scent range to deter them from predation.

=== Physical properties ===
Sepia officinalis ink forms a polydisperse suspension composed by spheric particles with a size between 80 and 150 nm (measured by TRPS and SEM). The particles have a density of 1.27 g cm^{−3}, which may be due to the amount of metals that the ink has in its composition (4.7% in weight).

Heteroteuthis dispar is a cephalopod species known for releasing luminous ink. The light comes from a substance produced by a dedicated organ before being transferred into the ink sac.

== Types of ink shapes ==
The shapes taken by ink releases are classified as six types:

- pseudomorphs;
- pseudomorph series;
- ink ropes;
- clouds/smokescreens;
- diffuse puffs;
- mantle fills.

== Inking behaviours ==
I was much interested, on several occasions, by watching the habits of an Octopus or cuttle-fish ... they darted tail first, with the rapidity of an arrow, from one side of the pool to the other, at the same instant discolouring the water with a dark chestnut-brown ink.

— Charles Darwin, The Voyage of the Beagle

=== Escape strategies ===
Two distinct behaviors have been observed in inking cephalopods. The first is the release of large amounts of ink into the water by the cephalopod in order to create a dark, diffuse cloud (much like a smoke screen) that can obscure the predator's view, allowing the cephalopod to make a rapid retreat by jetting away.

The second response to a predator is to release pseudomorphs ("false bodies"), smaller clouds of ink with a greater mucus content, which allows them to hold their shape for longer. These are expelled slightly away from the cephalopod in question, which will often release several pseudomorphs and change colour (blanch) in conjunction with these releases. The pseudomorphs are roughly the same volume as and look similar to the cephalopod that released them, and many predators have been observed attacking them mistakenly, allowing the cephalopod to escape (this behaviour is often referred to as the "blanch-ink-jet manoeuvre").

Furthermore, green turtle (Chelonia mydas) hatchlings that have been observed mistakenly attacking pseudomorphs released by Octopus bocki have subsequently ignored conspecific octopuses.

=== Hiding strategy ===
The spotty bobtail squid releases ropes of ink longer than itself and hides among them, possibly to be confused with floating seagrass leaves.

=== Behavior around eggs ===
Octopuses have also been observed squirting ink at snails or crabs approaching their eggs.

Numerous cuttlefish species add a coat of ink to their eggs, presumably to camouflage them from potential predators.

== Use by humans ==
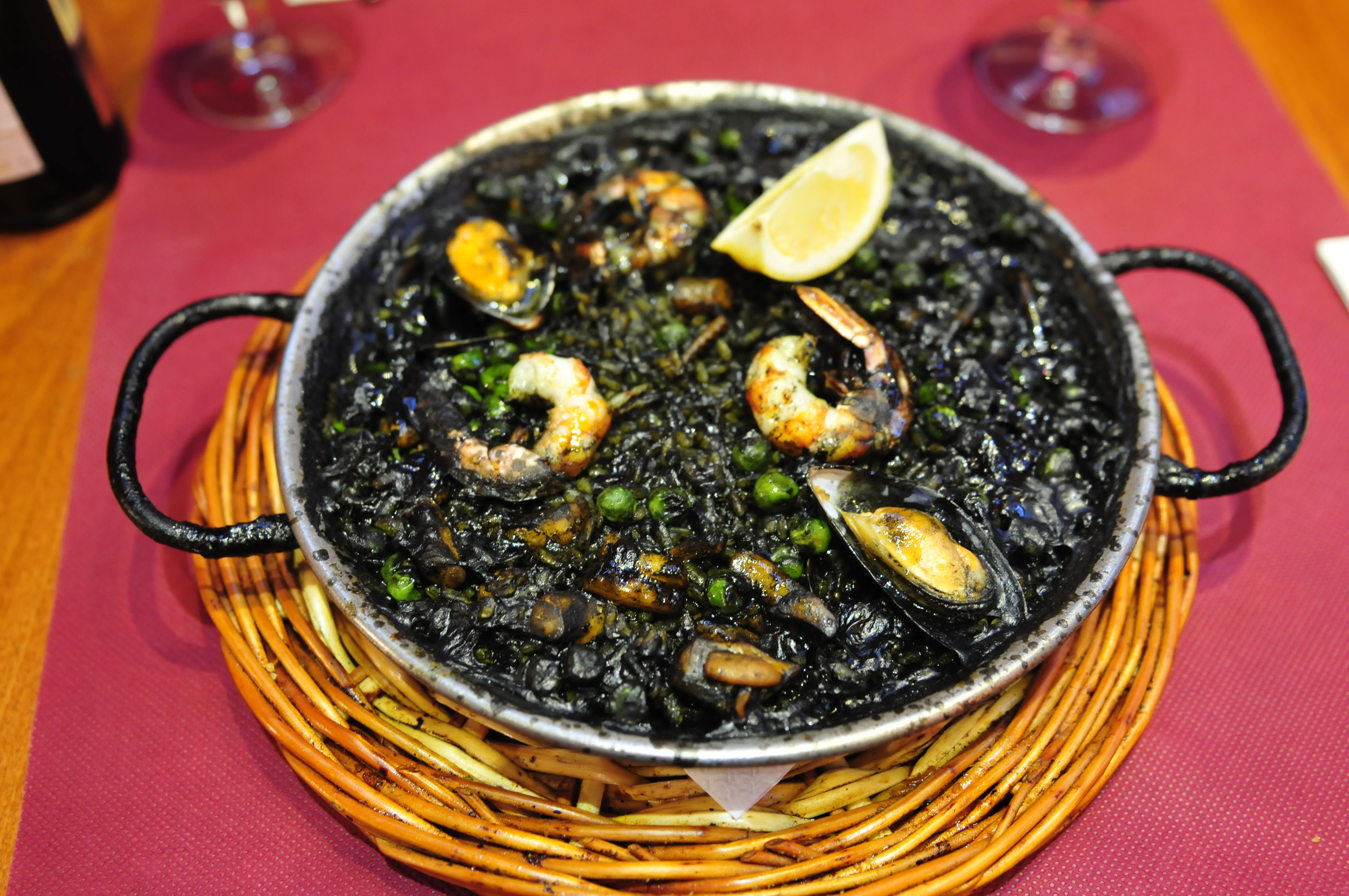
Arròs negre owes its dark colour to squid ink

Cephalopod ink has, as its name suggests, been used in the past as ink for pens and quills; the Greek name for cuttlefish, and the taxonomic name of a cuttlefish genus, Sepia, is associated with the brown colour of cuttlefish ink (for more information, see sepia).

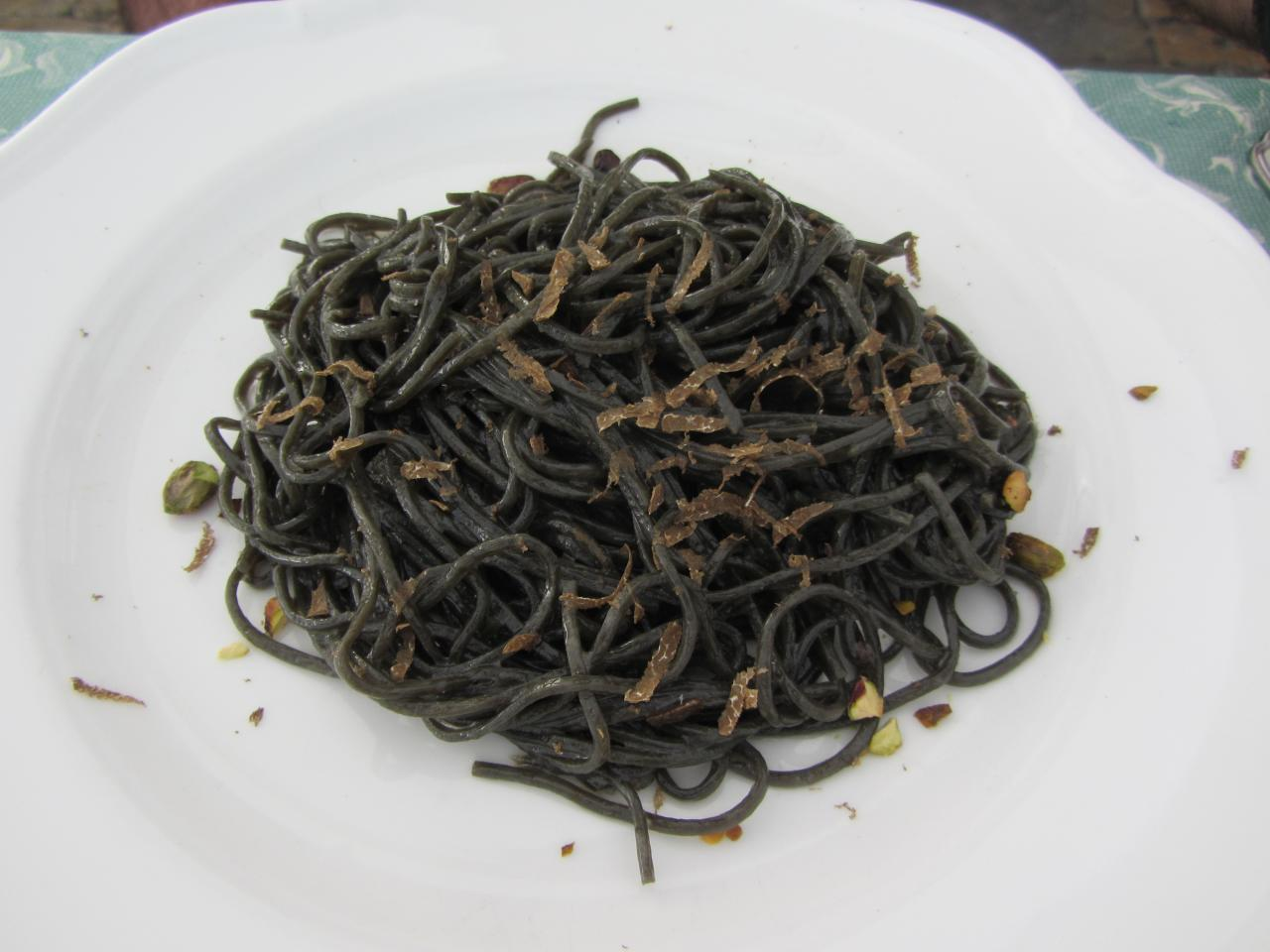
Squid ink pasta with truffles and pistachios

Modern use of cephalopod ink is generally limited to cooking, primarily in Japan and the Mediterranean, where it is used as a food colouring and flavouring, for example in pasta and sauces, and calamares en su tinta. For this purpose, it is generally obtainable from fishmongers, gourmet food suppliers, and is widely available in markets in Japan, Italy and Spain. The ink is extracted from the ink sacs during preparation of the dead cephalopod, usually cuttlefish, and therefore contains no mucus. While it is not commonly used in China, cephalopod ink is sometimes used to dye the dough of dumplings.

Studies have shown that cephalopod ink is toxic to some cells, including tumor cells. It is being researched in mice for its antitumor activity against Meth-A fibrosarcoma. However, it currently remains unclear if any of the antitumor activity of squid ink can be obtained from oral consumption, and this is indicated as an area for future investigation.

Preparation of squid ink pasta
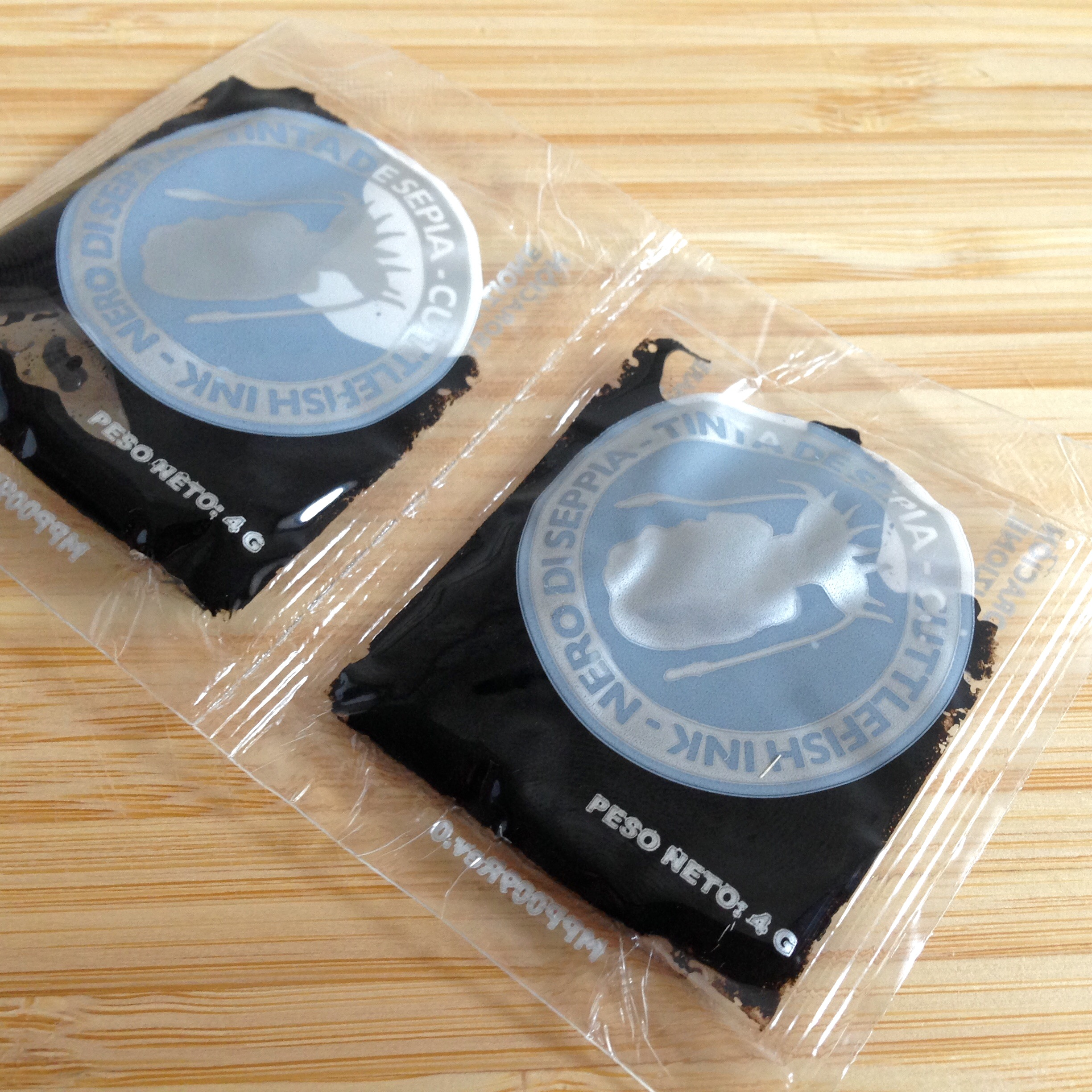
Commercially sold cuttlefish ink

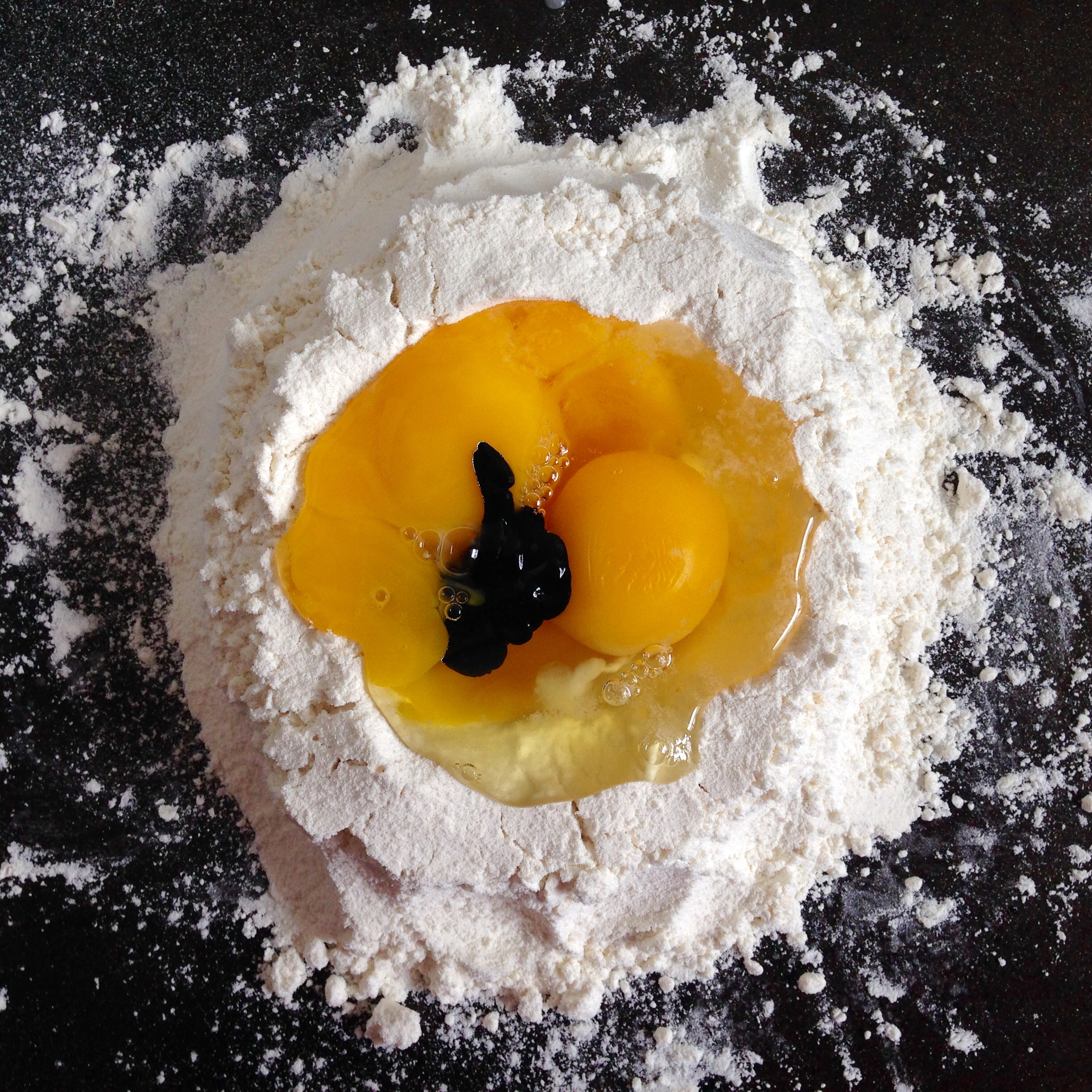
Squid ink is added to eggs and flour

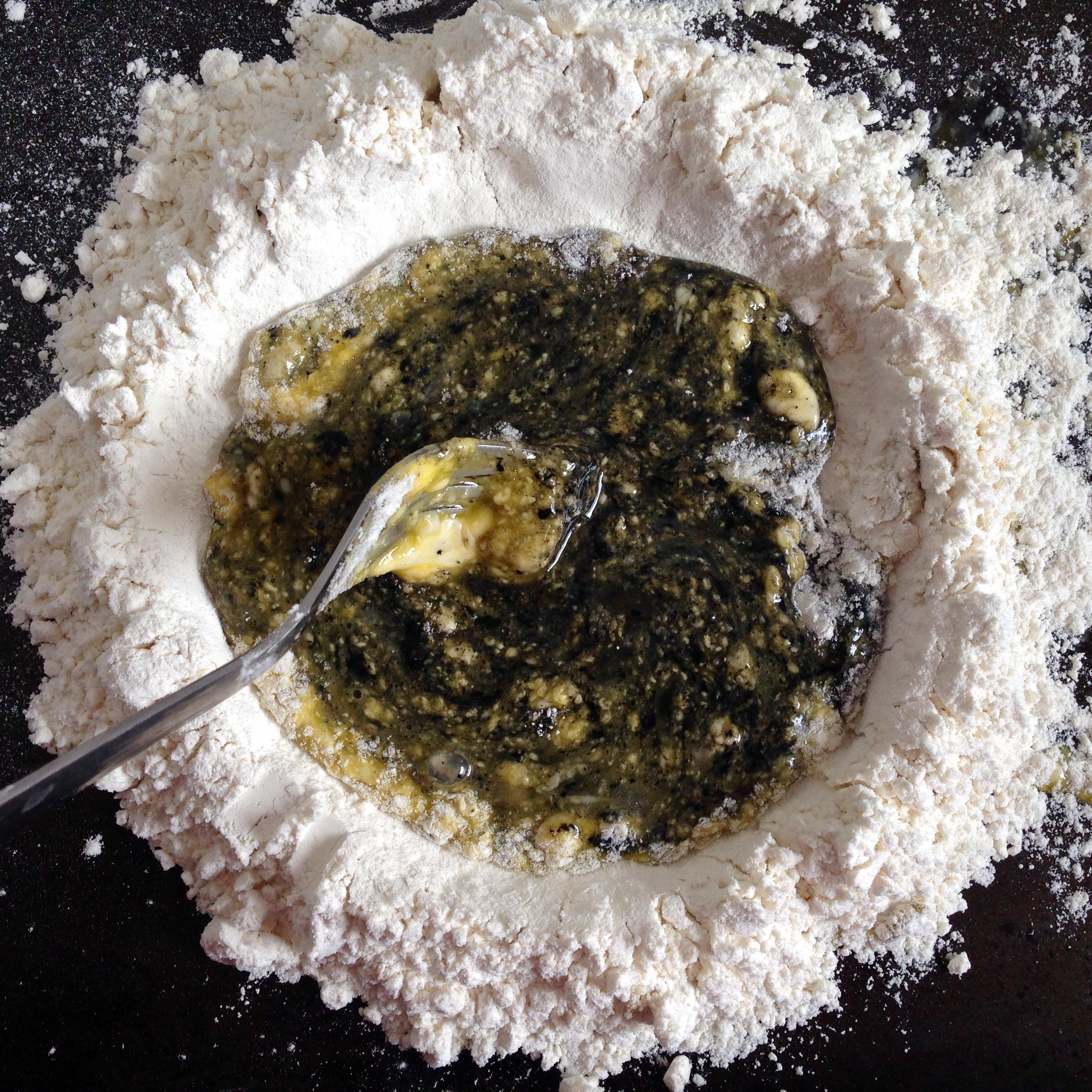
Ingredients are combined

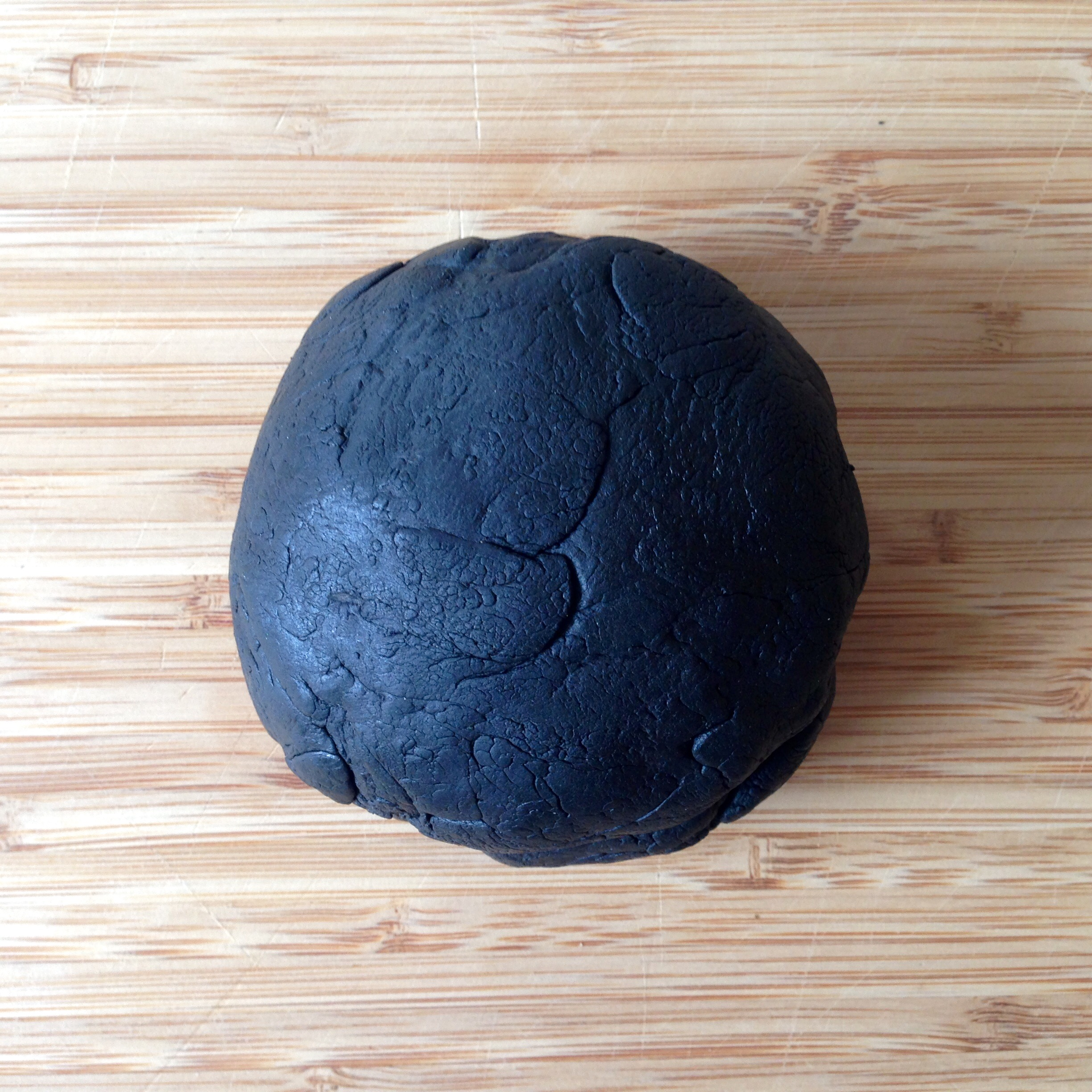
Squid ink dough

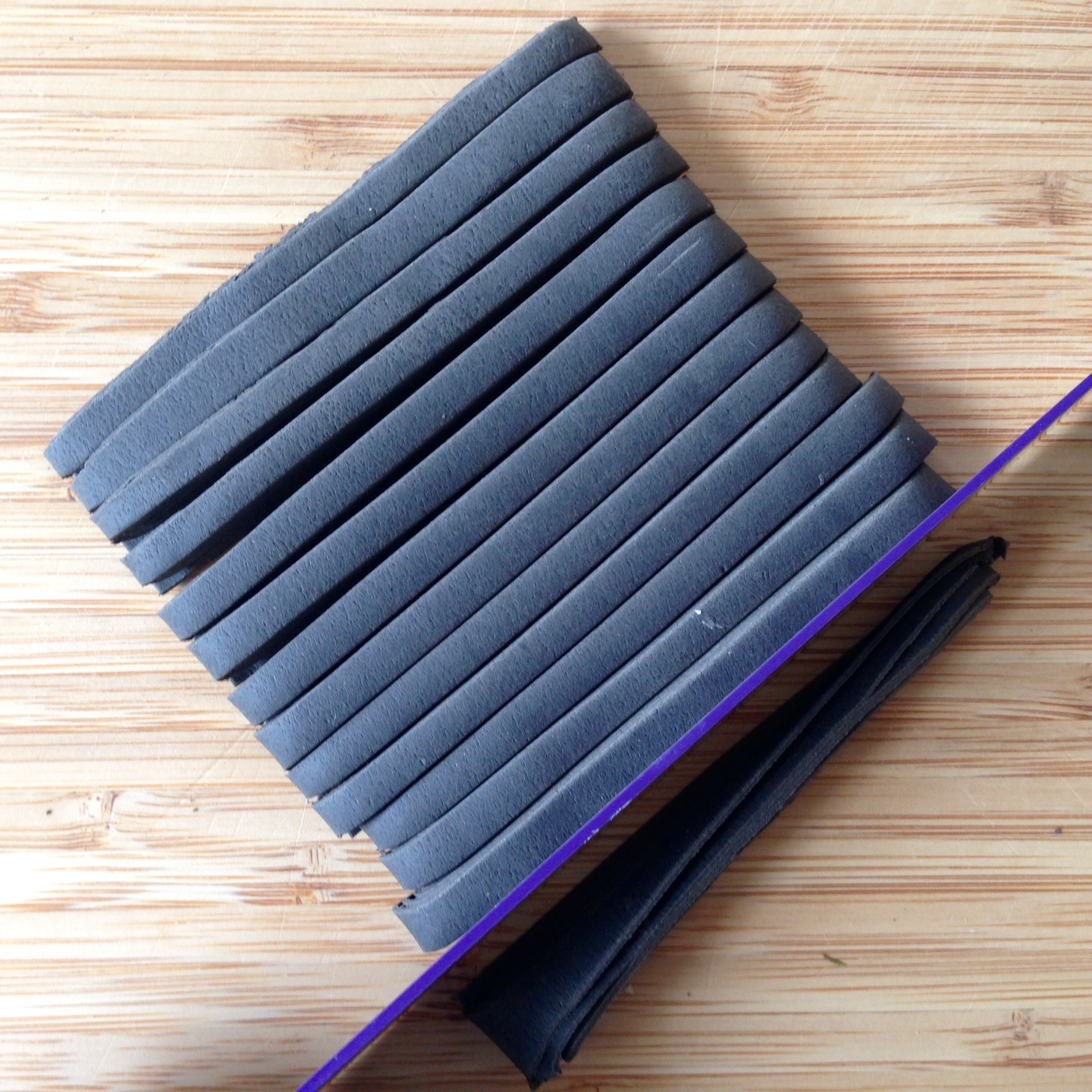
Dough is rolled out, then folded and sliced into noodles

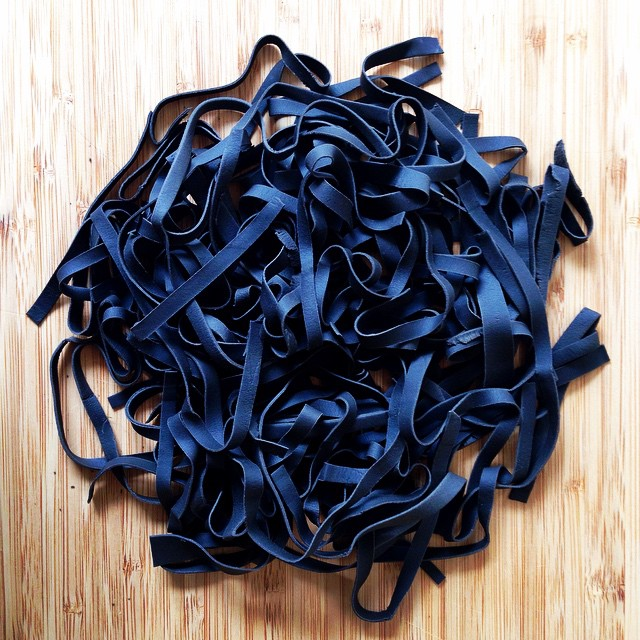
Homemade squid ink pasta

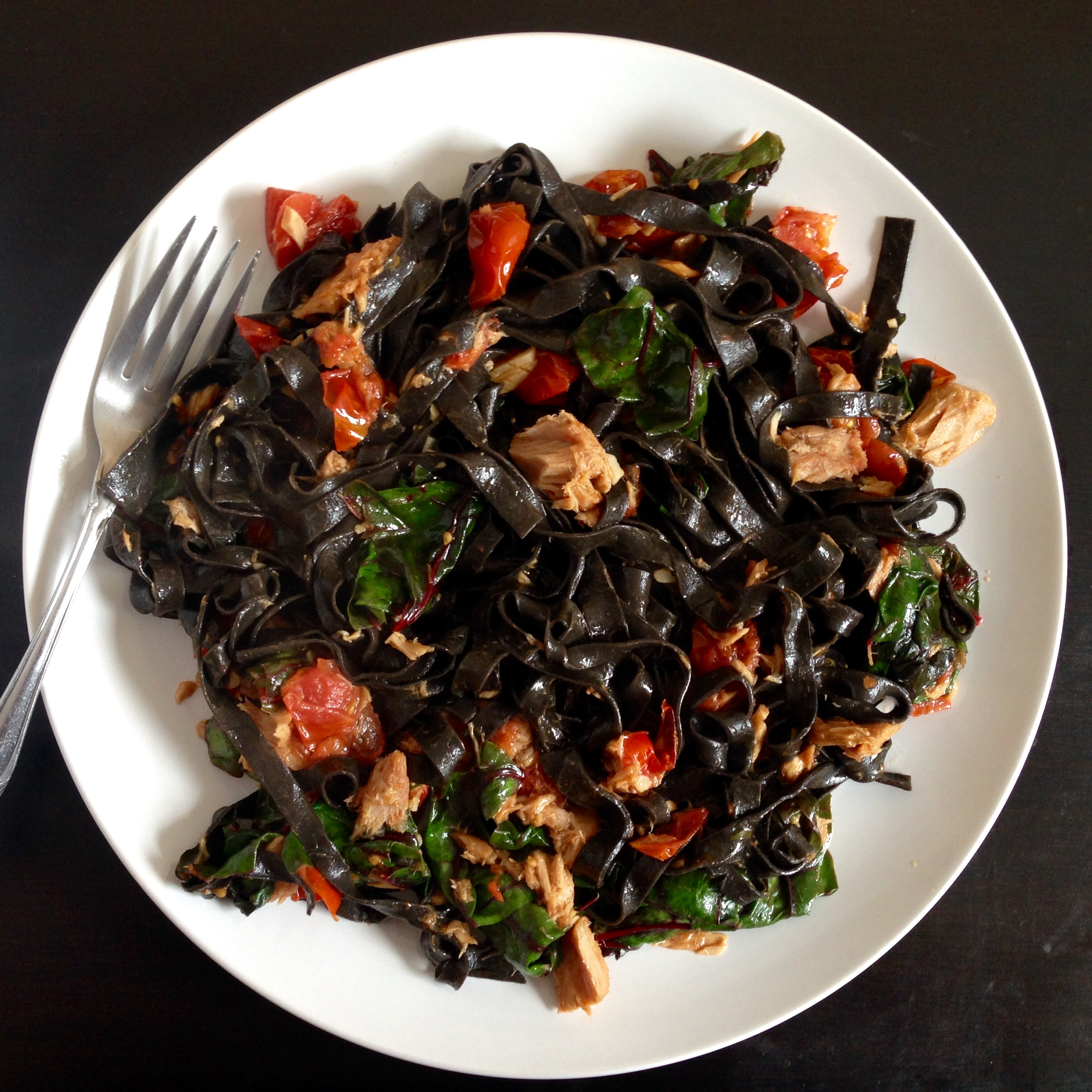
A dish made of squid ink pasta

== In popular culture ==
- Ink is a key element of the third-person shooter game series Splatoon.
