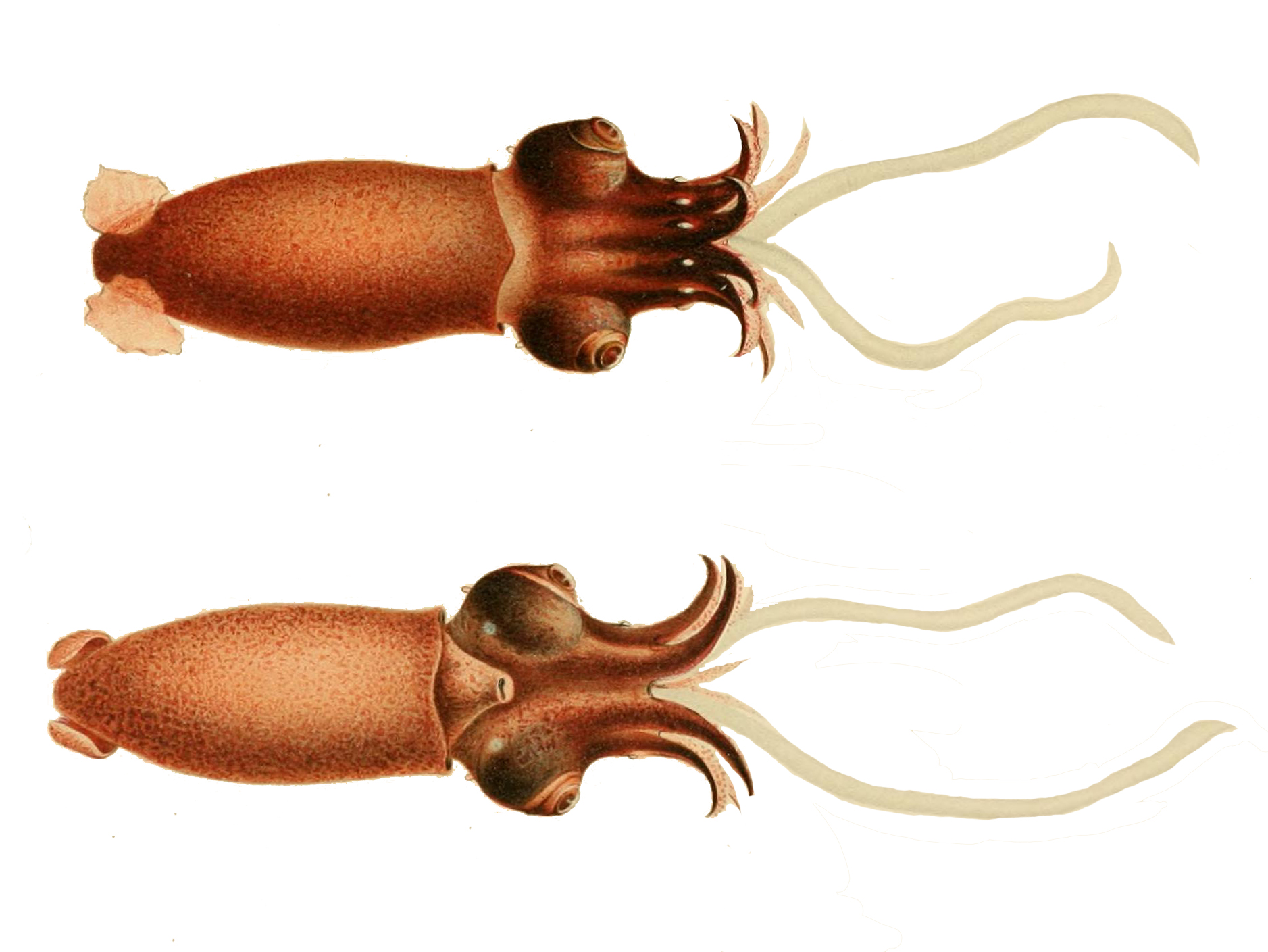
- Bathyteuthis abyssicola

Scientific classification
- Kingdom: Animalia
- Phylum: Mollusca
- Class: Cephalopoda
- Order: Bathyteuthida
- Family: Bathyteuthidae; Pfeffer, 1900
- Genus: Bathyteuthis; Hoyle, 1885

Type species
- Bathytellina abyssicola (Habe, 1958)

Species
- See text

= Bathyteuthis =

Genus of squids

Bathyteuthis is the singular genus of squid in the family Bathyteuthidae, encompassing six species.

Bathyteuthis species are found scattered throughout the world's oceans at mesopelagic to bathypelagic depths, commonly between 700–2,000 m (2,300–6,600 ft). They are found in deep-sea territories and can be spotted on the coast of New England.

The genus contains bioluminescent species.

== Description ==
Bathyteuthis are deep reddish maroon in colour and small in size, with none exceeding 80 mm in mantle length. The arms on Bathyteuthis are short, joined by a low, fleshy web, with suckers arranged in irregular rows (two proximally increasing to four distally). Tentacular clubs are short and narrow, with 8–10 longitudinal series of numerous, minute suckers. Buccal connectives have small suckers attached to the dorsal border of the ventral arms (arms IV). Fins are small, round and separate. The head has eyes turned slightly to the front. Suckers lack circularis muscles. Females have paired oviducts.

== Reproduction ==
While the reproduction of many deep-sea squids is poorly known, one Bathyteuthis species, B. berryi, is known to brood its eggs after spawning. It lays relatively few eggs but these eggs are large, protected from predators and parasites, and develop and hatch at a depth decided by the parent.

== Taxonomy ==
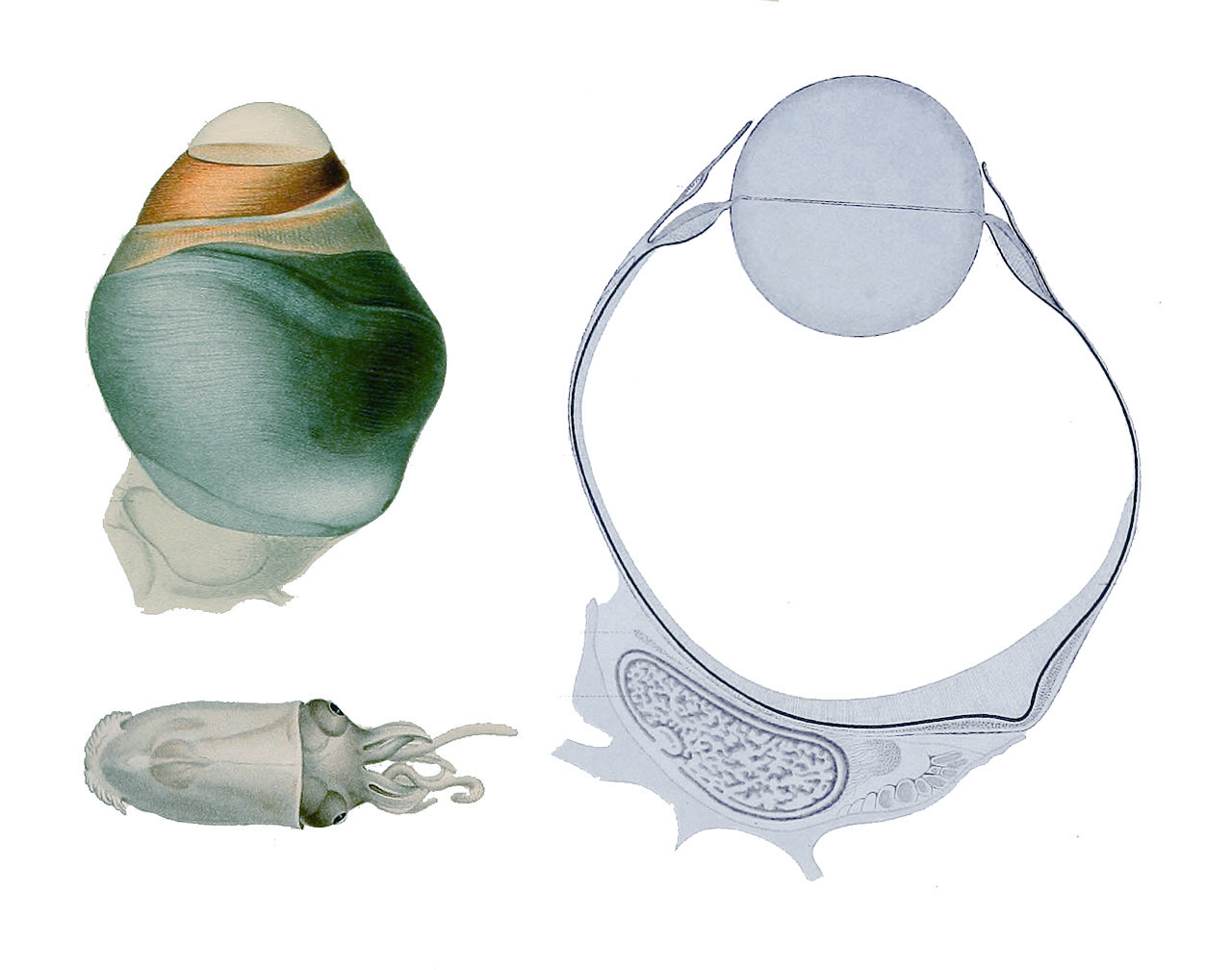
Eye of Bathyteuthis sp.

Bathyteuthis shares some characters with oegopsid squid and others with the Myopsida, hence its placement in a separate suborder, the Bathyteuthoidea, by some authorities. The paired oviducts (in females) and suckers without circularis muscles are characteristic of ordinary Oegopsida. However, buccal connective tissue with suckers and tentacle pockets in the head are characters found in myopsid squid, but absent in the Oegopsida.

== Species ==
Six species of Bathyteuthis are currently recognized.

- Bathyteuthis abyssicola Hoyle, 1885
- Bathyteuthis bacidifera Roper, 1968
- Bathyteuthis berryi Roper, 1968
- Bathyteuthis devoleii Judkins, Lindgren, Villanueva, Clark & Vecchione, 2020
- Bathyteuthis inopinata Judkins, Lindgren, Villanueva, Clark & Vecchione, 2020
- Bathyteuthis numerosa Judkins, Lindgren, Villanueva, Clark & Vecchione, 2020
