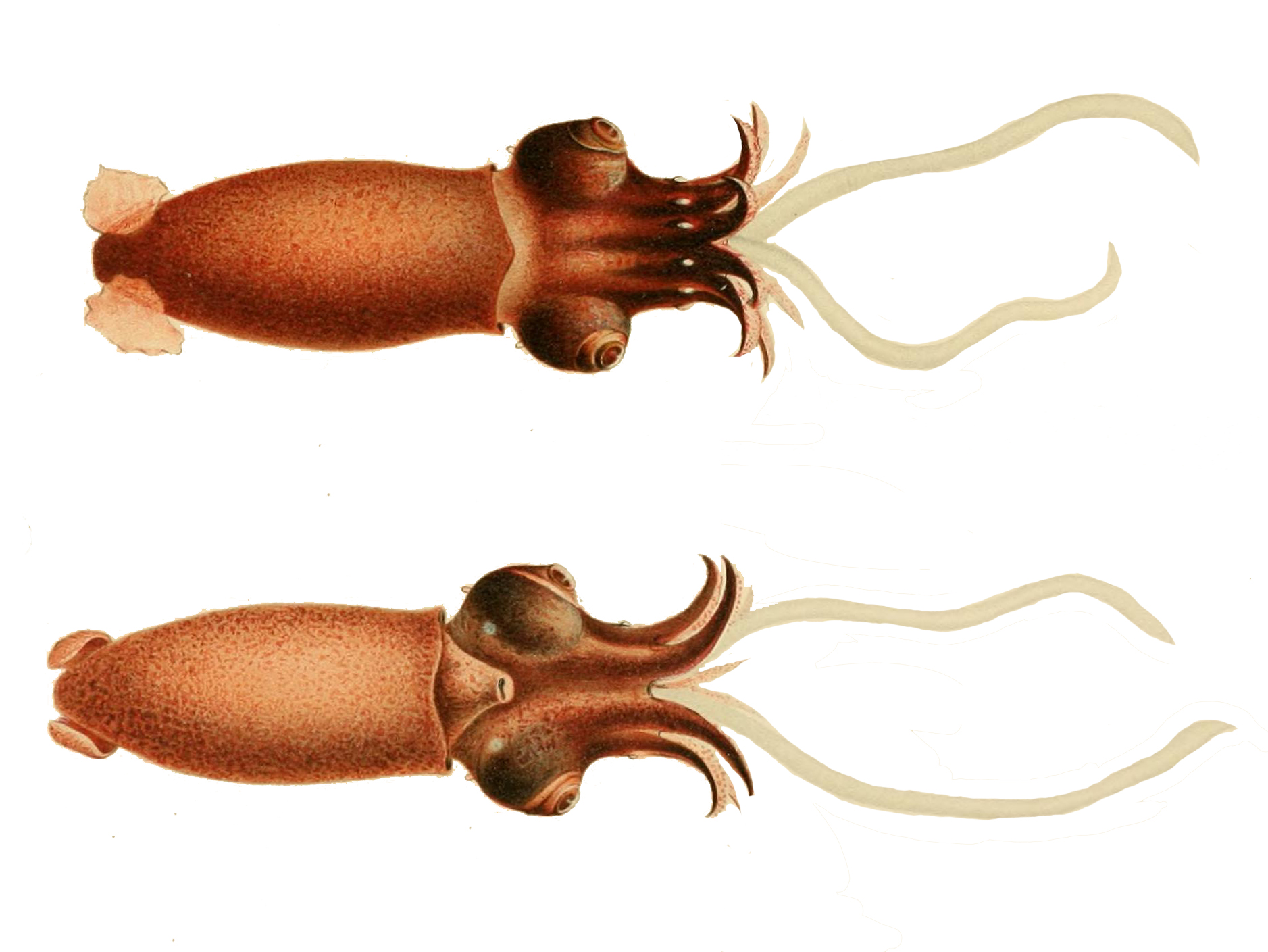
- Dorsal (top) and ventral aspects

Conservation status
- Least Concern (IUCN 3.1)

Scientific classification
- Kingdom: Animalia
- Phylum: Mollusca
- Class: Cephalopoda
- Division: Neocoleoidea
- Superorder: Decapodiformes
- Order: Bathyteuthida
- Family: Bathyteuthidae
- Genus: Bathyteuthis
- Species: B. abyssicola

Binomial name
- Bathyteuthis abyssicola Hoyle, 1885

Synonyms
- Benthoteuthis megalops Verrill, 1885

= Bathyteuthis abyssicola =

Species of squid

Bathyteuthis abyssicola, also known as the deepsea squid, is a species of squid in the family Bathyteuthidae.

Bathyteuthis abyssicola is the type species of Bathyteuthis. It is a small (less than 8 cm (3.1 in) mantle length), deep maroon-colored squid that inhabits the meso- and bathypelagic zones of all oceans of the world, and is particularly abundant in the Southern Ocean where it seems to be the dominant small deep-sea squid. B. abyssicola normally occurs at depths from 700–2,000 m (2,300–6,600 ft), but has been recorded from 100–4,200 m (330–13,780 ft).

The arms of B. abyssicola are short, with blunt tips. Protective membranes are low, fleshy, without free trabeculae (beam- or finger-like protuberances). Suckers are relatively few in number, about 100 on each of the upper six arms (pairs I–III). Sucker rings on the arms have 8–18 separated, bluntly rounded to truncate protuberances. The tentacles and clubs are relatively short. Gills are short and narrow.

They have large photosensitive vesicles just behind the eyes which appear to detect bioluminescence. These photosensitive vesicles are among the largest known in any cephalopod.

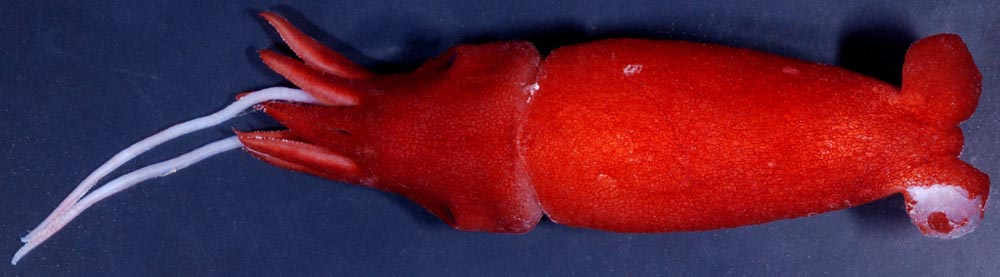
Bathyteuthis abyssicola from the Ross Sea of Antarctica (67°37′S 178°55′W)
