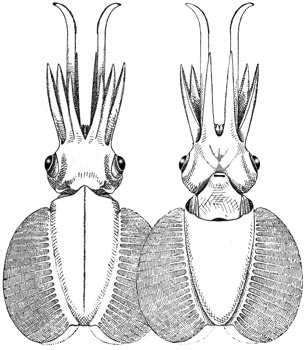
- Chtenopteryx sicula caught off Naples.

Conservation status
- Data Deficient (IUCN 3.1)

Scientific classification
- Kingdom: Animalia
- Phylum: Mollusca
- Class: Cephalopoda
- Order: Bathyteuthida
- Family: Chtenopterygidae
- Genus: Chtenopteryx
- Species: C. sicula

Binomial name
- Chtenopteryx sicula (Vérany, 1851)

Synonyms
- Calliteuthis nevroptera Jatta, 1896; Chtenopteryx fimbriatus Appellöf, 1890; Chtenopteryx siculus (Vérany, 1851); Ctenopteryx cyprinoides Joubin, 1894; Ctenopteryx sicula (Vérany, 1851); Sepioteuthis sicula Vérany, 1851

= Chtenopteryx sicula =

Comb-finned squid

Species of squid

Chtenopteryx sicula, also known as the comb-finned squid or toothed-fin squid, is a species of squid native to at least the Mediterranean Sea. It is characterised by several distinct morphological features: ocular photophores are present but visceral photophores are absent, arm suckers are arranged in at least 4 series distally, and club suckers are borne in more than 8 series.

The type specimen was collected off Messina, Italy; the specific name sicula means "of Sicily". It is deposited at the Muséum d'Histoire Naturelle (Musée Barla) in Nice.

== Gallery ==
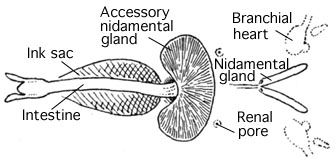
Ventral view of the viscera, showing the absence of a visceral photophore and the presence of the accessory nidamental gland.

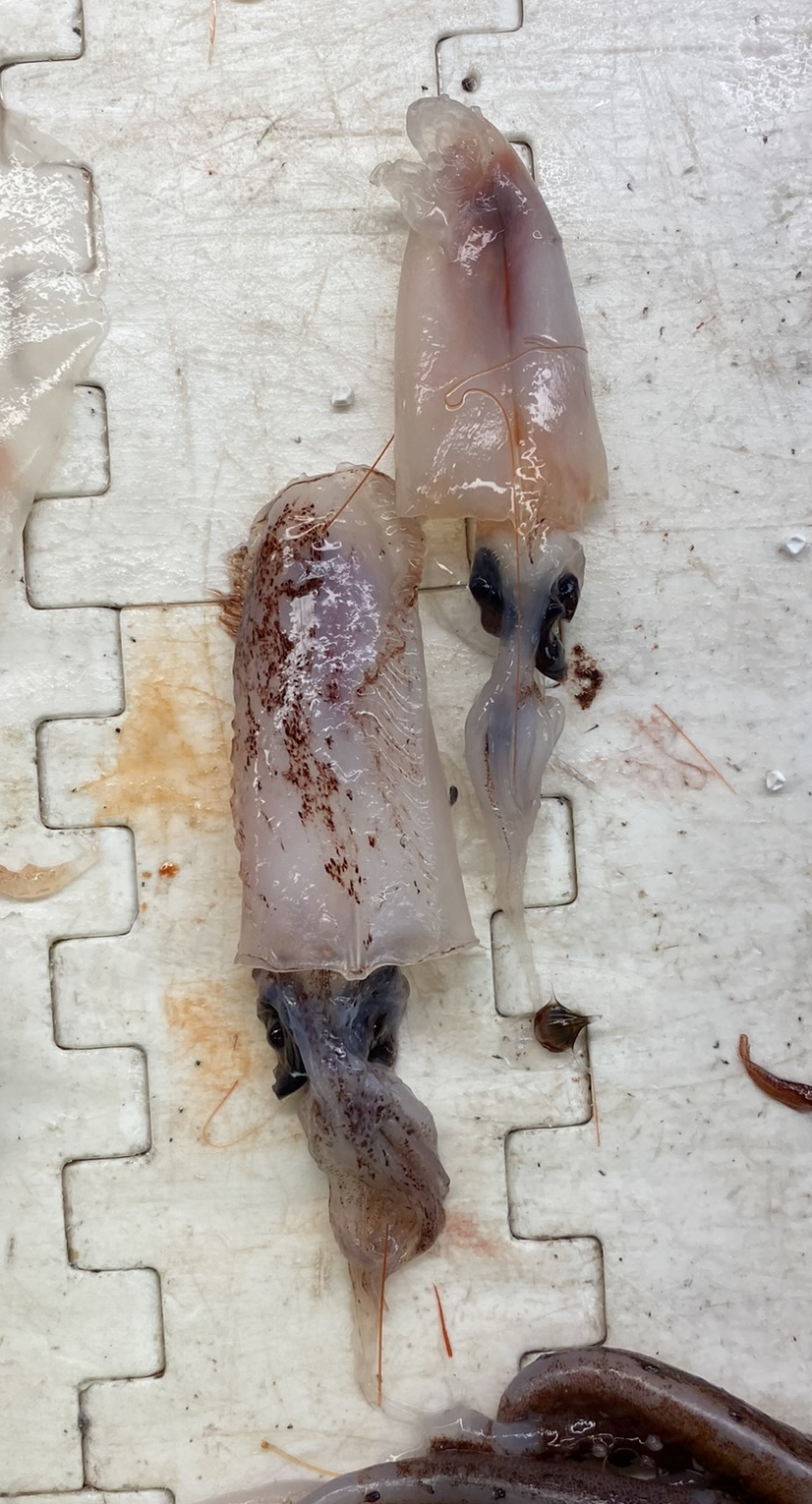
Fresh-caught specimens of C. sicula from the North Atlantic

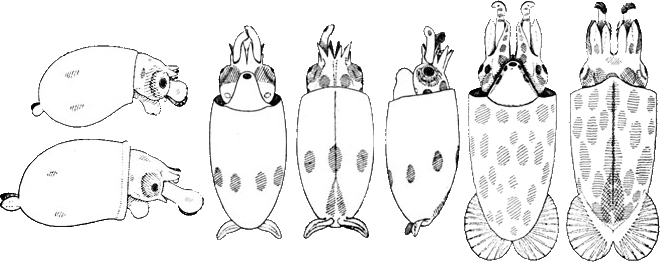
Chtenopteryx sicula paralarvae. Left: Two very young paralarvae. The circular tentacular clubs bear approximately 20 irregularly arranged suckers. Two chromatophores are present on each side of the mantle. Centre: Ventral, dorsal and side views of a more advanced paralarva. An equatorial circulet of seven large yellow-brown chromatophores is present on the mantle. Posteriorly the expanded vanes of the gladius are visible in the dorsal view. Right: Ventral and dorsal views of a very advanced paralarva.
