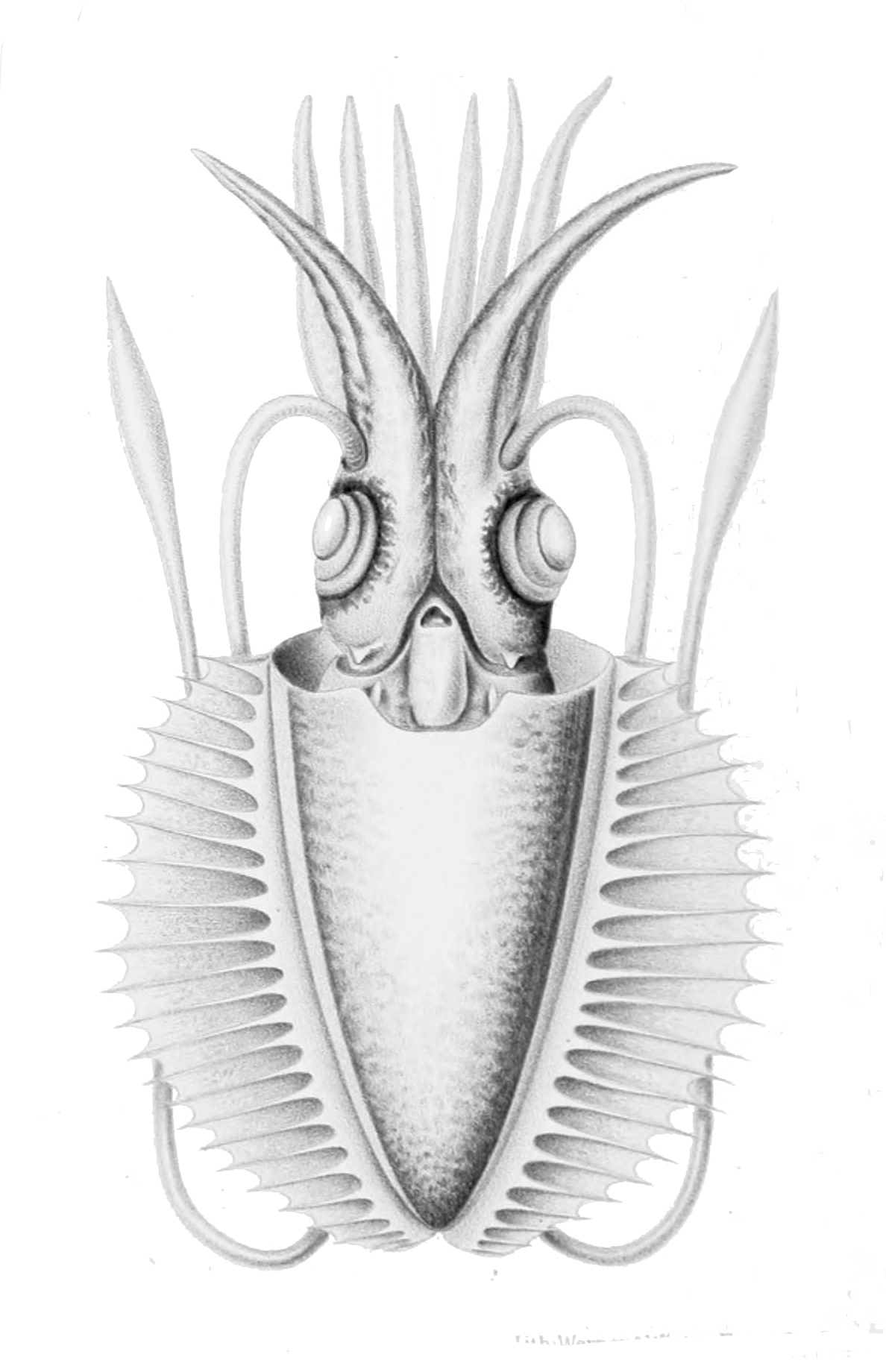
- Chtenopteryx sicula

Scientific classification
- Domain: Eukaryota
- Kingdom: Animalia
- Phylum: Mollusca
- Class: Cephalopoda
- Order: Bathyteuthida
- Family: Chtenopterygidae; Grimpe, 1922
- Genus: Chtenopteryx; Appellöf, 1890

Type species
- Sepioteuthis sicula Vérany, 1851

Species
- See text

= Chtenopteryx =

Genus of squids

Chtenopteryx is a genus of small, muscular, midwater squid in the monotypic family Chtenopterygidae. Four species are presently recognized in the genus, but more are believed to exist.

These squid occupy tropical to subtropical waters, probably at depths of between 500–1,000 m (1,600–3,300 ft) during the day and near-surface waters at night.

The genus contains bioluminescent species.

== Species ==
- Chtenopteryx canariensis Salcedo-Vargas & Guerrero-Kommritz, 2000
- Chtenopteryx chuni * Pfeffer, 1912
- Chtenopteryx sepioloides Rancurel, 1970
- Chtenopteryx sicula (Vérany, 1851), comb-finned squid or toothed-fin squid

The species listed above with an asterisk (*) is questionable and needs further study to determine if it is a valid species or a synonym.
