= Arròs negre =

Valencian and Catalan seafood and rice dish

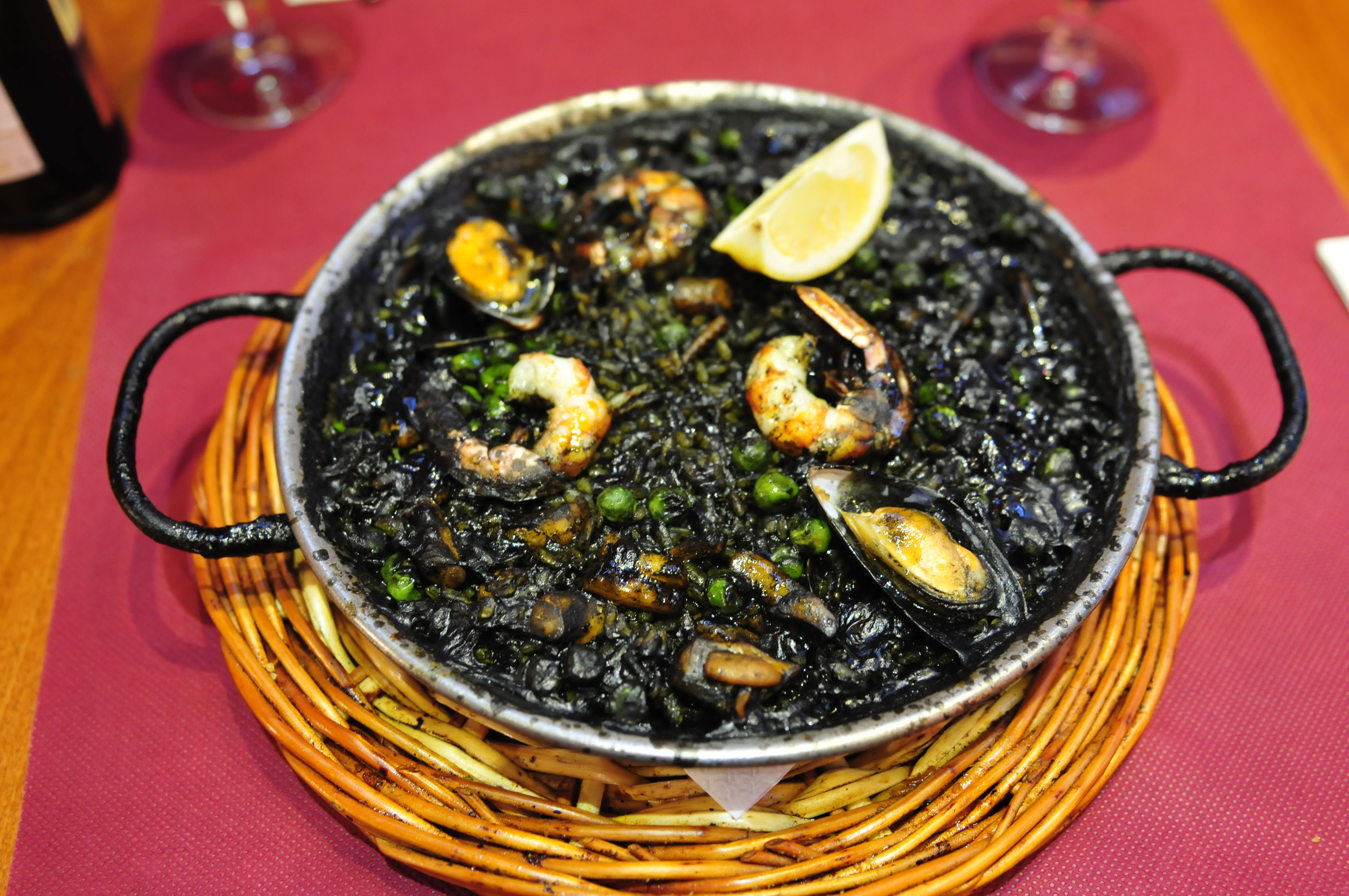
- Arròs negre with crab, shrimp and squid
- Alternative names: Arroz negro, paella negra, black risotto
- Course: Main course
- Place of origin: Spain
- Region or state: Valencia, Catalonia
- Serving temperature: Hot
- Main ingredients: White rice, cuttlefish or squid, cephalopod ink, cubanelle peppers
- Variations: Fideuà negra
- Other information: Also popular in Puerto Rico

Arròs negre or arrós negre (Valencian: [aˈrɔz ˈneɣɾe], Spanish: arroz negro [aˈroθ ˈneɣɾo]) is a Valencian and Catalan dish made with cuttlefish or squid and rice, somewhat similar to seafood paella. Some call it paella negra ("black paella"), although it is traditionally not called a paella even though it is prepared in a similar manner.

Arròs negre should not be confused with black rice, which is heirloom rice that has a naturally dark color.

The traditional recipe for this dish calls for squid ink, cuttlefish or squid, white rice, garlic, green cubanelle peppers, sweet paprika, olive oil and seafood broth. However, many cooks add other seafood as well, such as crab and shrimp.

The dish's dark color comes from squid ink which also enhances its seafood flavor.

In addition to Valencia and Catalonia, this dish is popular in Cuba and Puerto Rico where on both islands it is known as arroz con calamares ("rice with squid" in Spanish). In the Philippines, it is considered to be a subtype of the Filipino adaptation of paelya and is known as paella negra (or paelya negra). Black rice dishes with cuttlefish or squid ink are also made in Italy, Croatia and Montenegro, where they are known as "black risotto".

Fideuà negra ("black noodles" in Valencian) is a variation made with noodles instead of rice and is usually served with aioli.

== See also ==
- Catalan cuisine – Mediterranean style of cuisine from Catalonia
- List of rice dishes
- List of seafood dishes
- Valencian cuisine – Cuisine from the Valencian Community
