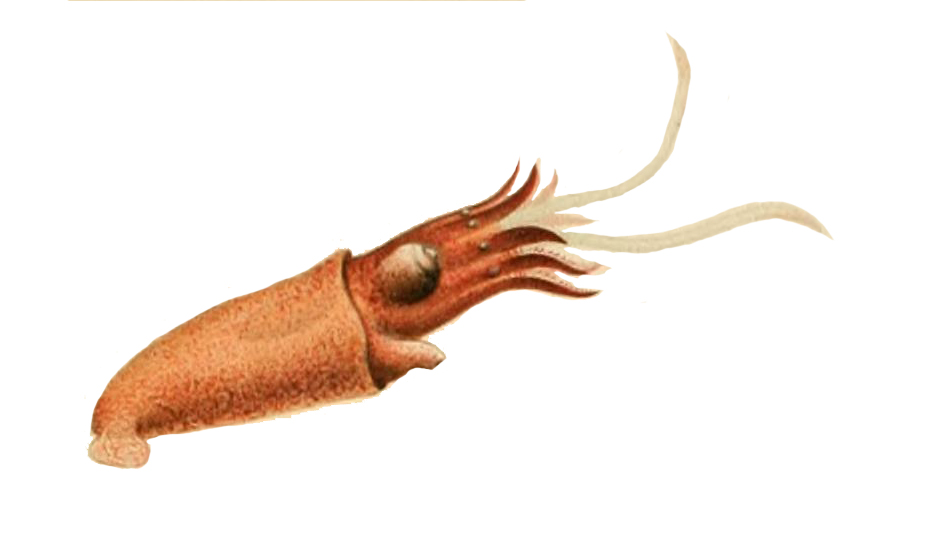
- Bathyteuthis abyssicola

Scientific classification
- Domain: Eukaryota
- Kingdom: Animalia
- Phylum: Mollusca
- Class: Cephalopoda
- Superorder: Decapodiformes
- Order: Bathyteuthida; Lindgren, 2010

Families
- Bathyteuthidae; Chtenopterygidae

= Bathyteuthida =

Order of squids

Bathyteuthida is an order of cephalopods, consisting of small, mesopelagic to bathypelagic squid that in some ways resemble myopsid squid, such as Loligo and in others the pelagic oegopsid squid. Its two families, the Bathyteuthidae and Chtenopterygidae, each containing a single genus, have previously been included with the oegopsids.

As with the oegopsids, the Bathyteuthida lack corneal membranes covering their eyes, something common to myopsid squid, and have paired oviducts, lacking in myopsids. As with the myopsids, bathyteuthids have tentacle pockets in the head and small suckers on the buccal supports, found only in this group, Loliginidae, and Sepiidae; neither is found in true oegopsids. The Bathyteuthida do share the open ocean pelagic habitat with the oegopsid squid, uniting them in that way with that diverse group.

The Bathyteuthidae and Chtenopterygidae differ in body conformation, the internal shell, and in the manner in which buccal supports attach to the lowermost arms (pair IV). Buccal supports attach to the dorsal side of arms IV in the Bathyteuthidae and the ventral side of arms IV in the Chtenopterygidae.
