= List of ice cream parlor chains =

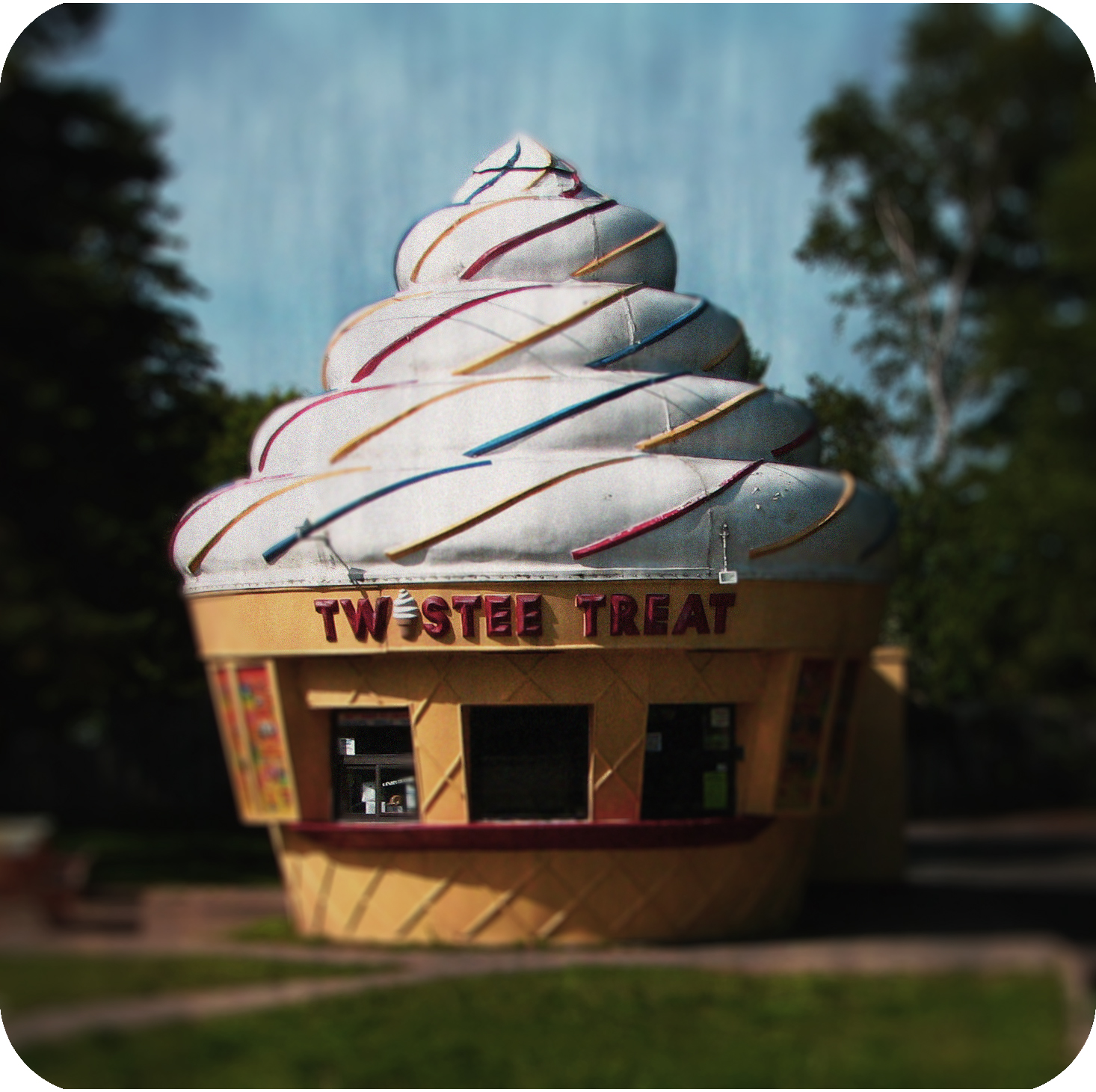
Eponymous Twistee Treat ice cream parlor in Minden, Ontario

This is a list of notable ice cream parlor chains. Ice cream parlors are places that sell ice cream (including gelato and frozen custard) to consumers.

Note: Chains that are no longer in business are displayed in italics.

| Name | Locations | Country(ies) | First location | Date opened | Note | Ref. |
|---|---|---|---|---|---|---|
| Abbott's Frozen Custard | 46 (2024) | United States | Rochester, New York | 1902 | | |
| Amorino | 250+ | Multiple | Paris, France | 2002 | Known for gelato sculpted into rose petals | |
| Ample Hills Creamery | 4 | United States | Brooklyn, New York | 2011 | | |
| Amy's Ice Creams | 15 | United States | Austin, Texas | 1984 | | |
| Andy's Frozen Custard | 150 (2024) | United States | Osage Beach, Missouri | 1986 | | |
| Australian Homemade | Over 50 | Multiple | Knokke, Belgium | 1989 | | |
| Austin's Homemade Ice Cream | 3 | United States | Ceredo, West Virginia | 1947 | | |
| Baskin-Robbins | 7800+ (2024) | Multiple | Glendale, California | 1945 | | |
| Ben & Jerry's | 573 (2021) | Multiple | Burlington, Vermont | 1978 | | |
| Big Gay Ice Cream | | United States | East Village, New York | 2011 | Began as an ice cream vendor in Brooklyn in 2009. Five locations at its peak. | |
| Bresler's 33 Flavors | | United States | | | Defunct in 2007. | |
| Braum's | 300+ | United States | Oklahoma City | 1968 | | |
| Brigham's Ice Cream | | United States | Newton Highlands, Massachusetts | 1914 | | |
| Bruster's Ice Cream | 214 (2024) | Multiple | Bridgewater, Pennsylvania | 1989 | | |
| Cadwaladers | 9 | Multiple | Criccieth, Wales | 1927 | | |
| Carvel | 320 | United States | Hartsdale, New York | c. 1934 – c. 1937 | Began as an ice cream vendor in Hartsdale in 1929. | |
| Ciao Bella Gelato Company | 8 | United States | Little Italy, New York | 1983 | | |
| Cold Rock Ice Creamery | 90 | Australia | Aspley, Australia | 1996 | | |
| Cold Stone Creamery | 929 (in the US alone in 2022) | Many | Tempe, Arizona | 1988 | | |
| Coolhaus | | | Indio, California | 2009 | Switched to animal-free whey protein in 2021. | |
| Coppelia | | | Havana, Cuba | 1966 | state-owned. | |
| Cows Creamery | 15 | Canada | Cavendish, Prince Edward Island | 1983 | | |
| Dairy Queen | 7700+ | Multiple | Joliet, Illinois | 1940 | | |
| Dippin' Dots | 106 | United States | Paducah, Kentucky | 1988 | | |
| Emack & Bolio's | | Many | Brookline, Massachusetts | 1975 | | |
| Farrell's Ice Cream Parlour | | United States | Portland, Oregon | 1963 | | |
| Fifty Licks | 5 | United States | Portland, Oregon | 2009 | | |
| Frankie & Jo's | 4 | United States | Seattle, Washington | 2013 | Serves vegan ice cream. | |
| Friendly's | 105 | United States | Springfield, Massachusetts | 1935 | | |
| Full Tilt Ice Cream | 2 | United States | Seattle, Washington | 2008 | Four locations at its peak. | |
| G&D's | 3 | England | Oxford, England | 1992 | | |
| Good Times Burgers & Frozen Custard | 31 (2023) | United States | | | | |
| Graeter's | 59 (2024) | United States | Cincinnati, Ohio | 1870 | | |
| Grido Helado | 1900 (2022) | Multiple | Argentina | 2000 | | |
| Häagen-Dazs | 900+ | Many | The Bronx, New York | 1960 | | |
| Handel's Homemade Ice Cream & Yogurt | 150 (2025) | United States | Youngstown, Ohio | 1945 | | |
| Herrell's Ice Cream | | United States | Northampton, Massachusetts | 1980 | | |
| High's Dairy Store | 60 | United States | Richmond, Virginia | 1928 | | |
| Island Creamery | 3 | United States | Chincoteague, Virginia | 1975 | | |
| Jahn's | 1 (2025) | United States | The Bronx, New York | 1897 | | |
| Jeni's Splendid Ice Creams | 80 (2025) | United States | Columbus, Ohio | 2002 | | |
| J.P. Licks | 16 (2026) | United States | Boston, Massachusetts | 1981 | | |
| KaleidoScoops | 5 | United States | | 1999 | | |
| Kaspa's | 104 | Multiple | Croydon, South London | 2012 | | |
| Kopp's Frozen Custard | 3 (2021) | United States | Milwaukee, Wisconsin | 1950 | | |
| Kawartha Dairy Company | 13 | Canada | Bobcaygeon, Ontario, Canada | 1937 | | |
| Kilwins | 146 | United States | Petoskey, Michigan | 1947 | Also known for fudge and candy. | |
| Kline's Dairy Bar | 4 | United States | Virginia | 1943 | | |
| Lappert's | | United States | Kauaʻi, Hawaii | | | |
| Laura Secord Chocolates | 100 (2023) | Canada | | | | |
| MADO | 305 | Multiple | Turkey | 1850 | | |
| MaggieMoo's Ice Cream and Treatery | 5 (2022) | | Kansas City, Kansas | 1989 | | |
| Marble Slab Creamery | 391 (2021) | Multiple | Houston, Texas | 1983 | | |
| Mashti Malone's | 4 | United States | Los Angeles, California | 1980 | | |
| McConnell's | 9 | United States | Santa Barbara, California | 1949 | | |
| Meadows Frozen Custard | 27 (2024) | United States | Duncansville, Pennsylvania | 1950 | | |
| Mixue Ice Cream & Tea | 46,479 (2024) | Multiple | Zhengzhou, China | 1997 | | |
| Morelli's | | Multiple | Broadstairs, England | 1932 | Began as an ice cream vendor in Scotland and Northern Ireland in 1907. | |
| Natural Ice Cream | 137 (2022) | India | Juhu, India | 1984 | | |
| New Zealand Natural | | Multiple | Sydney, Australia | 1985 | | |
| Newport Creamery | 10 (2023) | United States | Middletown, Rhode Island | 1940 | | |
| Oberweis Dairy | | United States | | | | |
| Rita's Italian Ice | 594 | United States | Bensalem Township, Pennsylvania | 1984 | | |
| Rossi's | | England | Southend-on-Sea, England | 1931 | | |
| Salt & Straw | 50 (2025) | United States | Portland, Oregon | 2011 | | |
| Shake Shack | 262 (United States), 142 (elsewhere) | Multiple | New York City | 2004 | Serves milkshakes, frozen custard, hamburgers, hot dogs, chicken, etc. | |
| Shake's Frozen Custard | | United States | Joplin, Missouri | 1991 | | |
| Steve's Ice Cream | | | Somerville, Massachusetts | 1973 | | |
| Strickland's Frozen Custard | | United States | Akron, Ohio | 1936 | | |
| Sugar Hill Creamery | 4 (2026) | United States | Harlem, New York | 2017 | | |
| Sweet Rose Creamery | 6 | United States | | | | |
| Swensen's | Over 350, including one in the United States | Many | San Francisco, California | 1948 | | |
| Tastee-Freez | 4 | United States | | | Down from nearly 1800 locations in 1957 | |
| Thrifty Ice Cream | 184 (in Mexico) | Multiple | Los Angeles | c. 1940, possibly earlier | Used to be served by the scoop at Thrifty/Rite Aid drugs stores; now at independent shops in the Southwestern United States and northern Mexico | |
| Tipsy Scoop | 4? | United States | New York City | 2013 | | |
| Toscanini's | 1 | United States | Cambridge, Massachusetts | | | |
| Twistee Treat | 40+ | United States | North Fort Myers, Florida | 1983 | | |
| Udders | 21 | Multiple | Singapore | 2007 | | |
| United Dairy Farmers | | United States | Norwood, Ohio | 1940 | | |
| Van Leeuwen Ice Cream | 103 | United States | New York, New York | 2008 | | |
| Wanderlust Creamery | 8 | United States | Los Angeles, California | 2015 | | |
| Wendy's Milk Bar | Over 200 | Multiple | Adelaide, South Australia | 1979 | Formerly Wendy's Supa Sundaes | |
| Whitey's Ice Cream | 8 (2024) | United States | Moline, Illinois | 1933 | | |

== See also ==
- La Michoacana (ice cream), a brand claimed by three different Mexican chains
- List of frozen yogurt companies
- List of ice cream brands
- List of ice cream flavors
