= Amorina =

Amorina may refer to:

- Amorina (film), a 1961 Argentine musical film
- Amorina (ammonite), a genus of ammonites
- Amorina (ship), a Swedish ship
- Amorina, an 1822 novel by Swedish author Carl Jonas Love Almqvist
- Henos Amorina, a former leader of the metalworkers of Osasco and a founding member of the Workers' Party of Brazil

== See also ==
- Amorini (disambiguation)
- Amorino (disambiguation)
