= Hog Wild =

Hog Wild may refer to:

- Hog Wild (1930 film), a 1930 short film starring Laurel and Hardy
- Hog Wild (album), a 1995 Hank Williams Jr. studio album
- Hog Wild (1980 film), a 1980 comedy film starring Patti D'Arbanville and Michael Biehn
- Hog Wild, a game level for the video game Crash Bandicoot
- WCW Hog Wild, a professional wrestling pay-per-view from World Championship Wrestling
- Hog Wild BBQ, an American restaurant
