= Walter Lappert =

Walter Lappert, (22 March 1921 – 1 September 2003) at the age of 61, founded a business in Kauai to manufacture and sell "super-premium" ice cream based on family recipes from his European upbringing. He rode a wave of enthusiasm for gourmet luxury foods using fresh, high-quality local ingredients in Hawaii. Using Belgian chocolate, vanilla beans from Madagascar, local macadamia nuts, guava, and coffee beans from Kona, Lappert created a menu of 125 flavors.

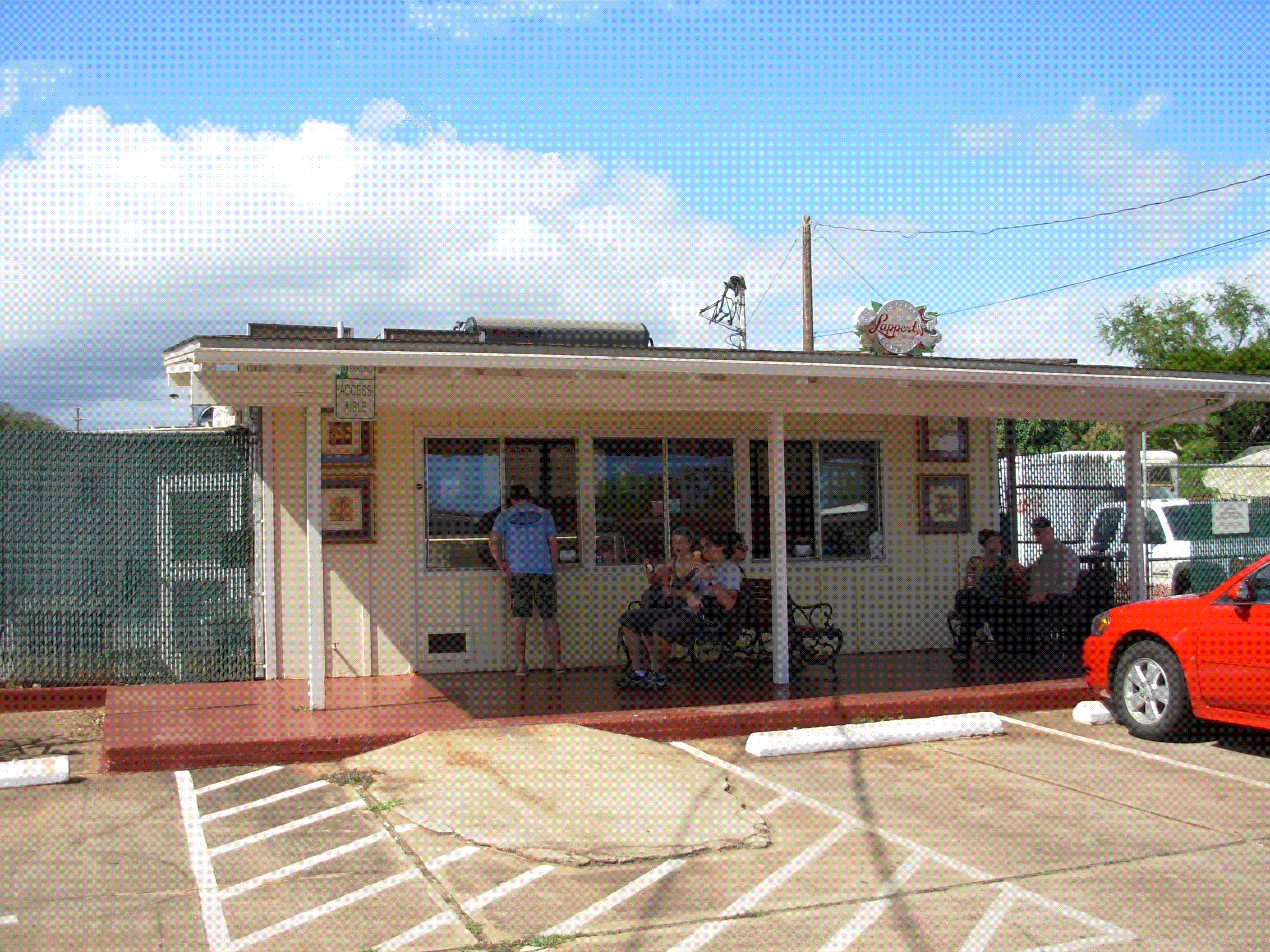
Location of first Lappert's, Hanapepe, Kauai

== Life before ice cream ==
Lappert was born in Austria to a French father and an Austrian mother. He grew up in Prague, with Austrian grandparents who owned a shop "where they made apple strudels and sold coffee, and in summertime, when the fruit was ripe, they made peach or strawberry ice cream." Later this shop would become the model for his retail outlets.

Lappert joined the French Army at 17, earning the rank of lieutenant, and was wounded in combat during World War II. He was fluent in eight languages. After the war, Lappert spent many years in South America where he was a distiller in Ecuador and became the purveyor of liquor to the Venezuelan military. Moving to the United States, he had a crepe shop in San Francisco and seafood restaurant in Sausalito, California.

== A brief retirement ==
At age 61, Walter Lappert retired to the Hawaiian island of Kauai, turning over his restaurant business to his son, Michael. Retirement, however, soon evolved into a new business venture when he found local dessert fare wanting. He and his wife invested half their savings, $150,000, to set up a factory to make ice cream in the town of Hanapepe, far from the tourist and commercial areas of Kauai. The first batch of 4,500 gallons (about 17,000 liters) was created on December 21, 1983 and sold out in two weeks, which convinced them they were going to be successful. (The 1980 population of Kauai was under 40,000 people.) A store in Koloa, a historic town near the popular sunny beaches of Poipu, and near Lappert's one-bedroom apartment, followed. Lappert adopted the Koloa store as an unofficial headquarters and was often found there, dressed in quintessential Hawaiian fashion of shorts, sandals, and flowered shirt, wearing a small cap and a white beard and accompanied by his black Labrador Maxi, chatting with tourists and locals after a dip in the surf. He made his personality part of his brand, integrating his smiling face into his labels and ads and encouraged the sobriquet, "the Hanapepe Ice Cream Man," By the late 1980s, Lappert's ice cream sold through some 75 stores across Hawaii and six states in the western part of the USA plus a franchise in Japan. The business branched out to roast its own coffee in 1985 and also began producing baked goods in some locations.

== Succession ==
Walter Lappert died in 2003. His former wife Mary Pratt (who had remained his business partner after their divorce in 1991) and Michael (one of his sons) each inherited half of the company. Two companies now exist: Lappert's Hawaii, led by Mary Pratt and headquartered in Hanapepe, Kauai, Hawaii; and Lappert's Ice Cream, led by Michael Lappert and headquartered in Richmond, California. Lappert's Ice Cream on the US mainland still uses the original logo that features Walter Lappert's distinctive silhouette in their branding.
