= Faloodeh =

Traditional Iranian cold dessert

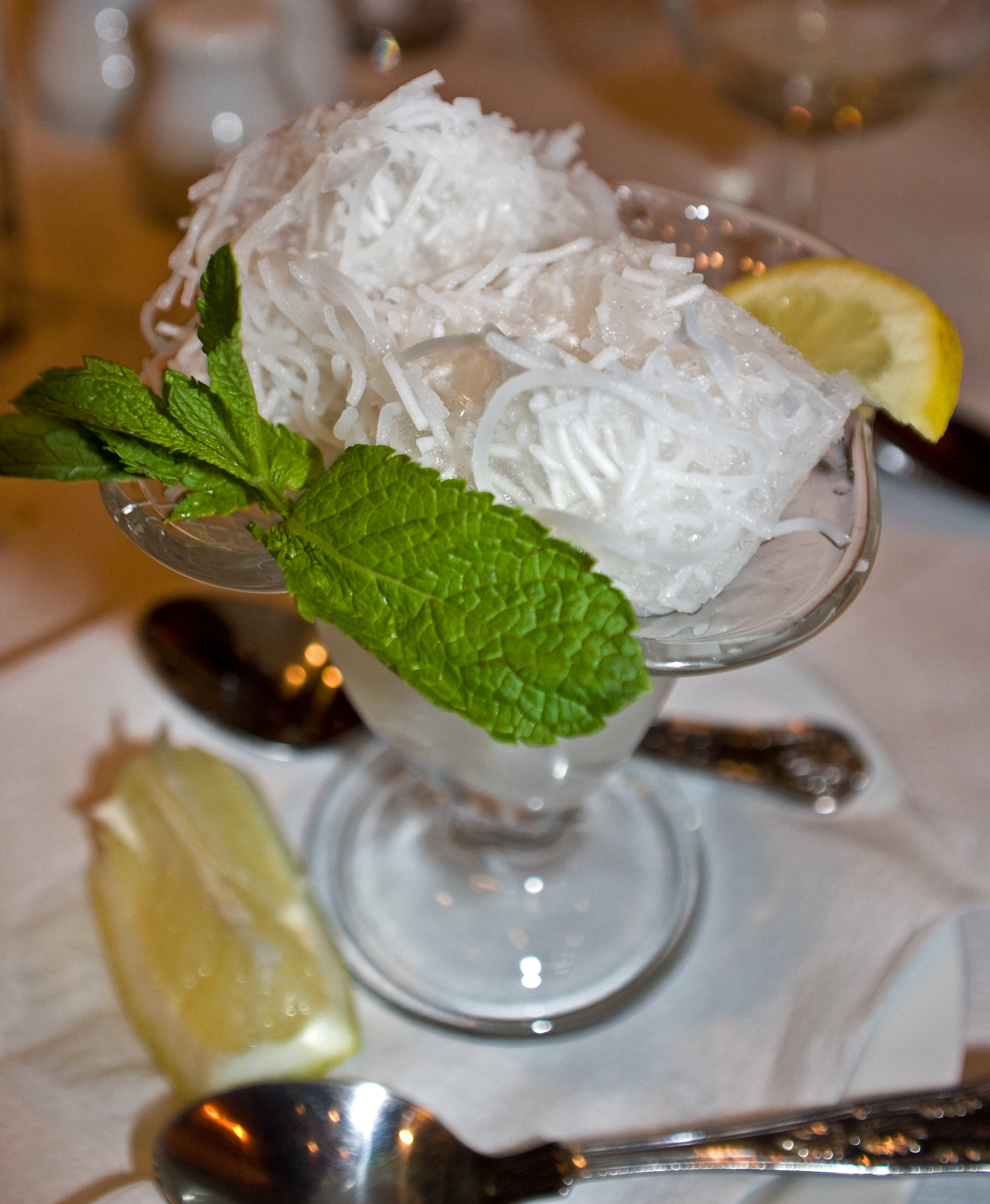
- Alternative names: Faludeh; paloodeh; paludeh; fālūdhaj
- Type: Dessert
- Course: Lunch; dinner
- Place of origin: Iran
- Region or state: Shiraz
- Main ingredients: Vermicelli; syrup (sugar, rose water)

Faloodeh (Persian: فالوده, romanized: fālūde, IPA: [fɒːluːd̪e]), or paloodeh (Persian: پالوده, romanized: pālūde, IPA: [pʰɒːluːd̪e]), is a traditional Iranian cold dessert similar to a sorbet. It consists of thin vermicelli-sized noodles made from starch in a semi-frozen syrup containing sugar and rose water. Faloodeh is often served with lime juice and sometimes ground pistachios.

In Iran, faloodeh is sold in ice cream stores and coffee shops in flavors such as pistachio, saffron, rose water, and honey, and can be served alongside bastani sonnati, a traditional Persian ice cream. Faloodeh Shirazi (Persian: فالوده شیرازی, romanized: fālūde Shirāzi), a version from the city of Shiraz, is particularly well-known.

In 2023, the Ministry of Cultural Heritage, Tourism and Handicrafts added faloodeh-making to Iran's List of the Intangible Cultural Heritage of Humanity.

== History ==
The Persian word paloodeh is derived from the verb paloodan (Persian: پالودن), which means "to refine". Faloodeh is an Arabicized form of paloodeh that appeared after the Arab conquest of Iran, due to a lack of the phoneme /p/ in Standard Arabic. In Arabic medieval sources, it was known as faloothaj (Arabic: فَالُوذَج, romanized: fālūḏaǧ), for example in Al-Muḥkam wa-al-muḥīt al-aʻẓam.

In the 16th to 18th centuries, the Indo-Persian Mughal kings who ruled South Asia created a cold dessert beverage called falooda, which is a derivative of faloodeh.. Moreover, the Yunnanese desert paoluda (泡鲁达) also originates from this dessert.

== Preparation ==
A thin batter of starch (from potatoes, arrowroot, maize, or rice) is cooked then pressed through a sieve, producing delicate strings similar to cellophane noodles that are then chilled in ice water. Afterwards, they are combined with the syrup mixture and rapidly cooled until the syrup is at least half-frozen.

== Faloodeh yazdi ==
Faloodeh yazdi, also known by the traditional name maqutek in Yazd province, is a variant of faloodeh, served as a cool drink.
