= Bastani =

Persian ice cream

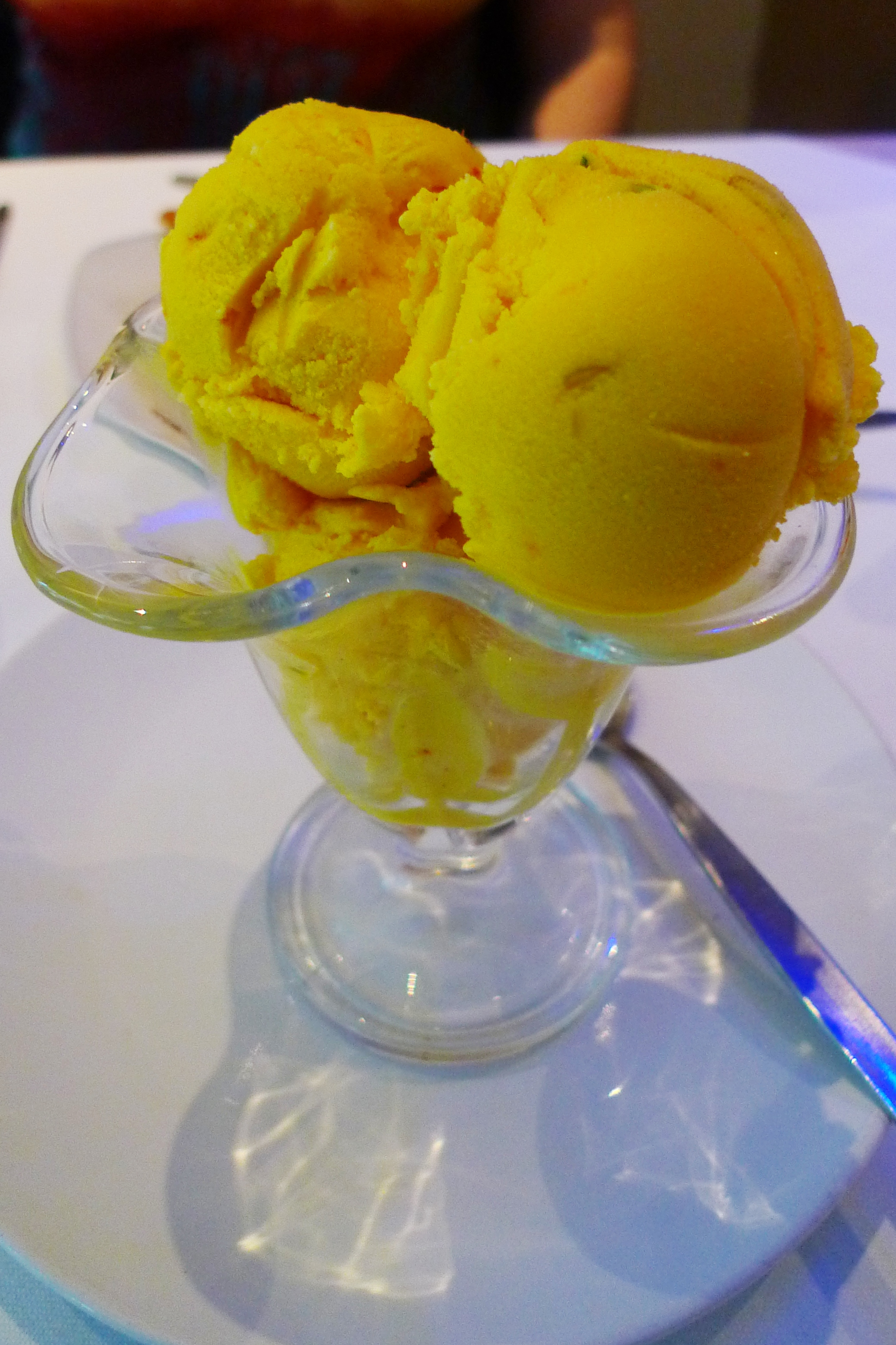
- Alternative names: Persian ice cream, Saffron ice cream, Bastani
- Type: Ice cream
- Place of origin: Iran (Ancient Persia)
- Region or state: Iran
- Associated cuisine: Iranian cuisine
- Created by: Persians
- Serving temperature: Cold
- Main ingredients: Milk, cream, sugar, flavorings (e.g. fruit puree or nut paste)

Bastani (Persian: بستنی), locally known as bastani sonnati (Persian: بستنی سنتی "traditional ice cream") or bastani sonnati zaferani (Persian: بستنی سنتی زعفرانی "traditional saffron ice cream"), is an Iranian ice cream made from milk, yolk, sugar, rose water, saffron, vanilla, and pistachios. It is known widely as Persian ice cream. Bastani often contains flakes of frozen clotted cream. Sometimes, salep is included as an ingredient.

Āb havīj bastani (Persian: آب هویج بستنی) is an ice cream float using carrot juice and occasionally, may be garnished with cinnamon, nutmeg, or other spices.

== History ==
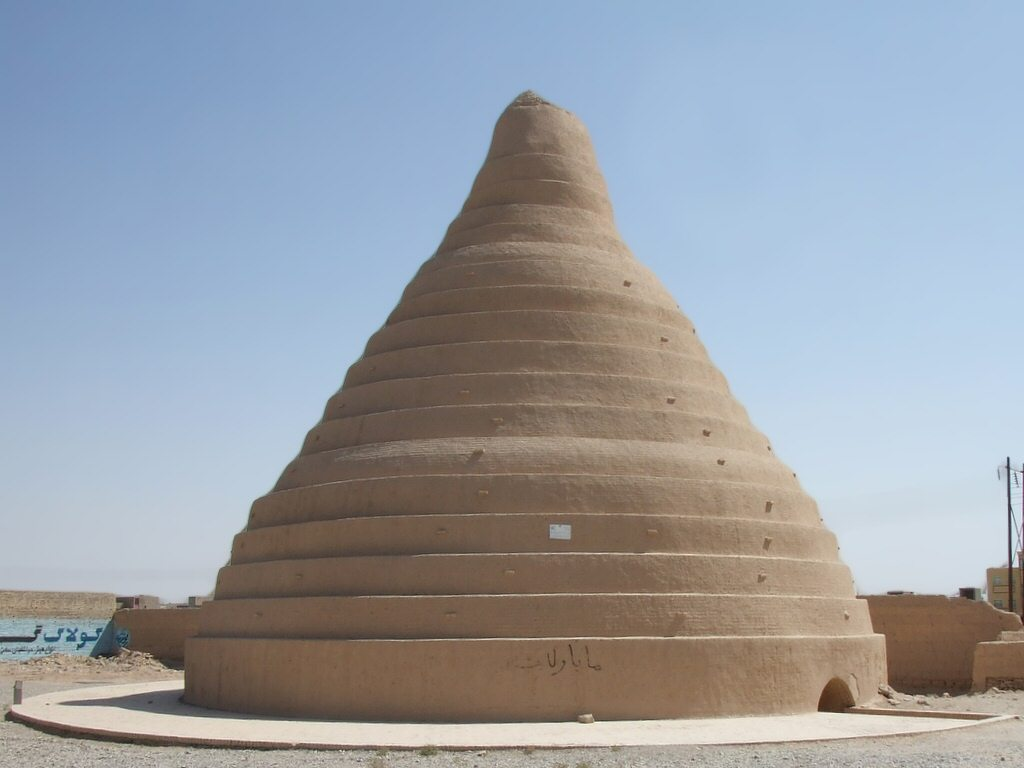
A yakhchal, an ancient type of ice house, in Yazd, Iran

The history of bastani probably began around 500 BC in the Achaemenid Empire of Persia. Various syrups would be poured over snow to produce summertime treats called "fruit ice" (sharbat). Typically, the ice was mixed with saffron, grape juices, fruits, and other flavours. The Macedonian leader Alexander the Great, who battled the Persians for ten years, enjoyed "fruit ices" sweetened with honey and chilled with snow.

In 400 BC, the Persians also invented a sorbet made with rose water and vermicelli called faloodeh (Persian: پالوده). Persians introduced ice cream and faloodeh to Arabs after the Arab invasion of Iran and the fall of Persian Sasanian Empire.

== See also ==
- Pistachio ice cream
- Faloodeh
- Kulfi
- Mashti Malone's in Los Angeles, California
- Spumoni
