= Frankie & Jo's =

American ice cream chain

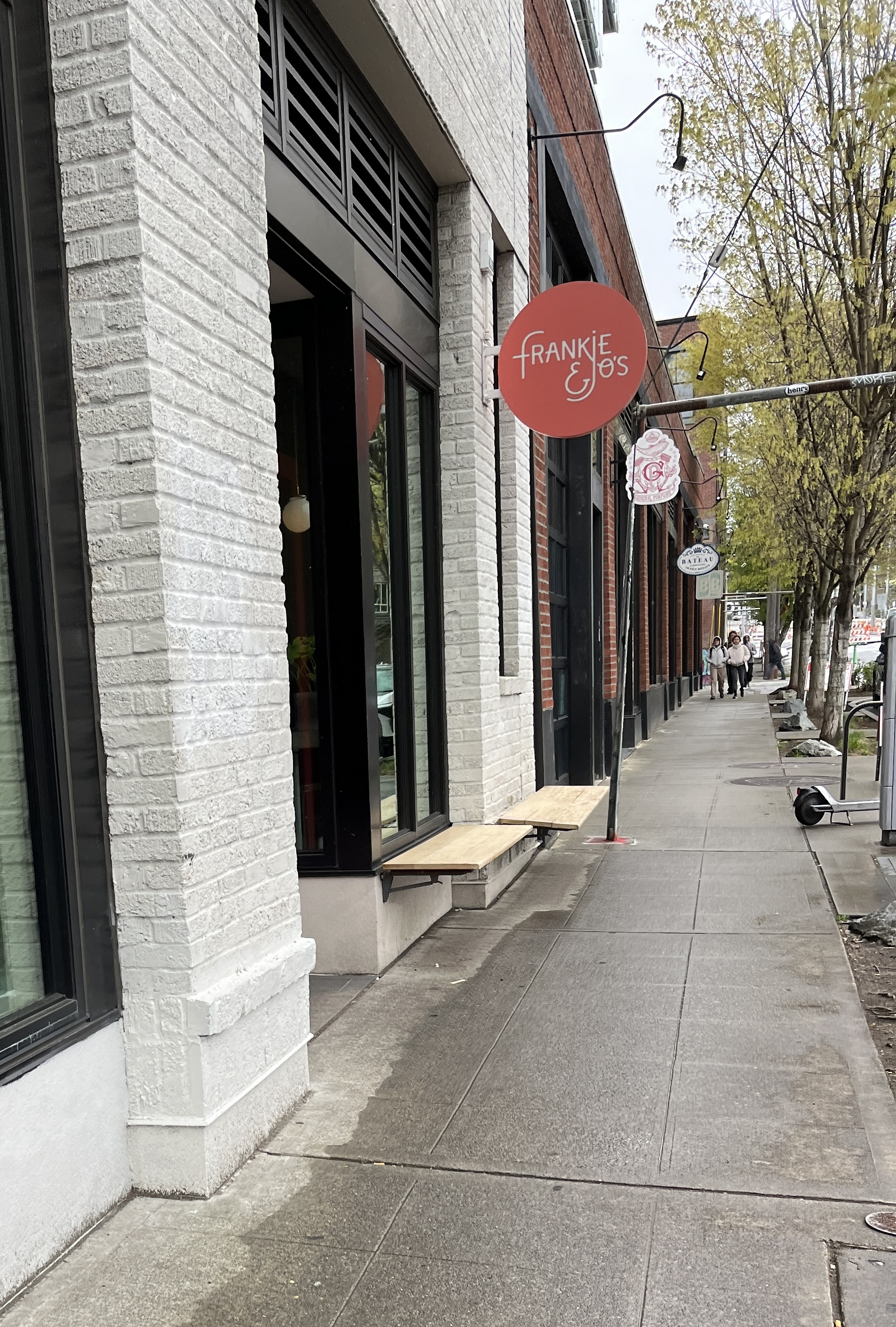
- Exterior of the shop on Seattle's Capitol Hill, 2024
- Interactive map of Frankie & Jo's

Restaurant information
- Established: 2013
- Owners: Autumn Martin; Kari Brunson
- Location: Seattle, King, Washington, United States
- Coordinates: 47.6130°N 122.3189°W
- Website: frankieandjos.com

Frankie & Jo's is a small chain of vegan ice cream shops based in Seattle, in the U.S. state of Washington. The business operates three shops in Seattle, and expanded to Larkspur, California, in 2023.

== Description ==
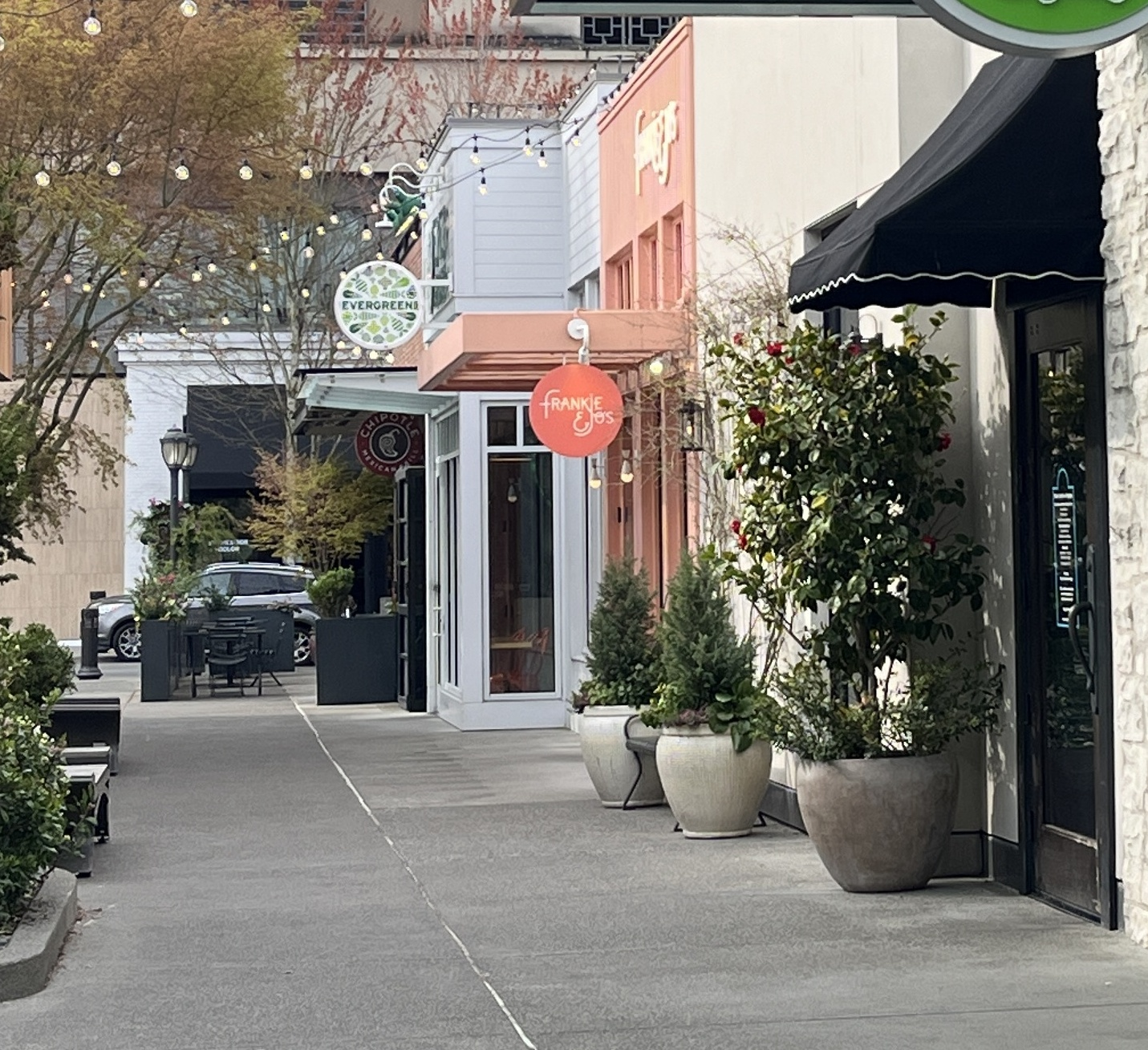
The shop at University Village, in Seattle's University District, 2024

Frankie & Jo's is a small chain of ice cream shops; as of 2023, the business has three shops in Seattle and another in Larkspur, California. VegOut has described Frankie & Jo's as "Seattle's favorite vegan, gluten-free, gum-free, stabilizer-free, and soy-free ice cream parlor".

According to Seattle's Child magazine, Frankie & Jo's is B-Corp certified and therefore "committed to sustainability, addressing climate change, organic practices, fair supply chain practices, taking care of its employees and supporting the community".

=== Menu ===
Frankie & Jo's specializes in plant-based ice cream and offers various flavors such as beet strawberry rose, brown sugar vanilla, mint brownie, strawberry milk, cranberry gingersnap oatnog, guava cake, strawberry tomato, pickled blueberry, chocolate tahini supercookie, jamoca chaga fudge, chocolate date, gingered golden milk, and salty caramel ash.

The California Cabin variety is pine and vanilla ice cream with black pepper cardamom shortbread cookies, and Strawberry Celebration Cake is vanilla ice cream with strawberry cake and strawberry jam.

The business also makes waffle cones from scratch, using oat flour. The cookies and shortbread use oats and vegetable oil.

== History ==
Autumn Martin started the business in 2013. She and co-founder Kari Brunson opened the first shop in 2016. Since then, two additional locations have opened in Seattle's Ballard neighborhood and University District. The Ballard location opened in 2018. The business expanded to Larkspur, California, in 2023. The Larkspur shop is approximately 200 square feet.

== Reception ==
In 2023, The Infatuation's Aimee Rizzo said Frankie & Jo's has Seattle's best ice cream. Sean Keeley included the business in Eater Seattle's 2024 list of fifteen "terrific" eateries in the city for vegan food.

== See also ==
- List of ice cream parlor chains
- List of vegetarian and vegan restaurants
