= Sweet Rose Creamery =

Ice creamery based in California, U.S.

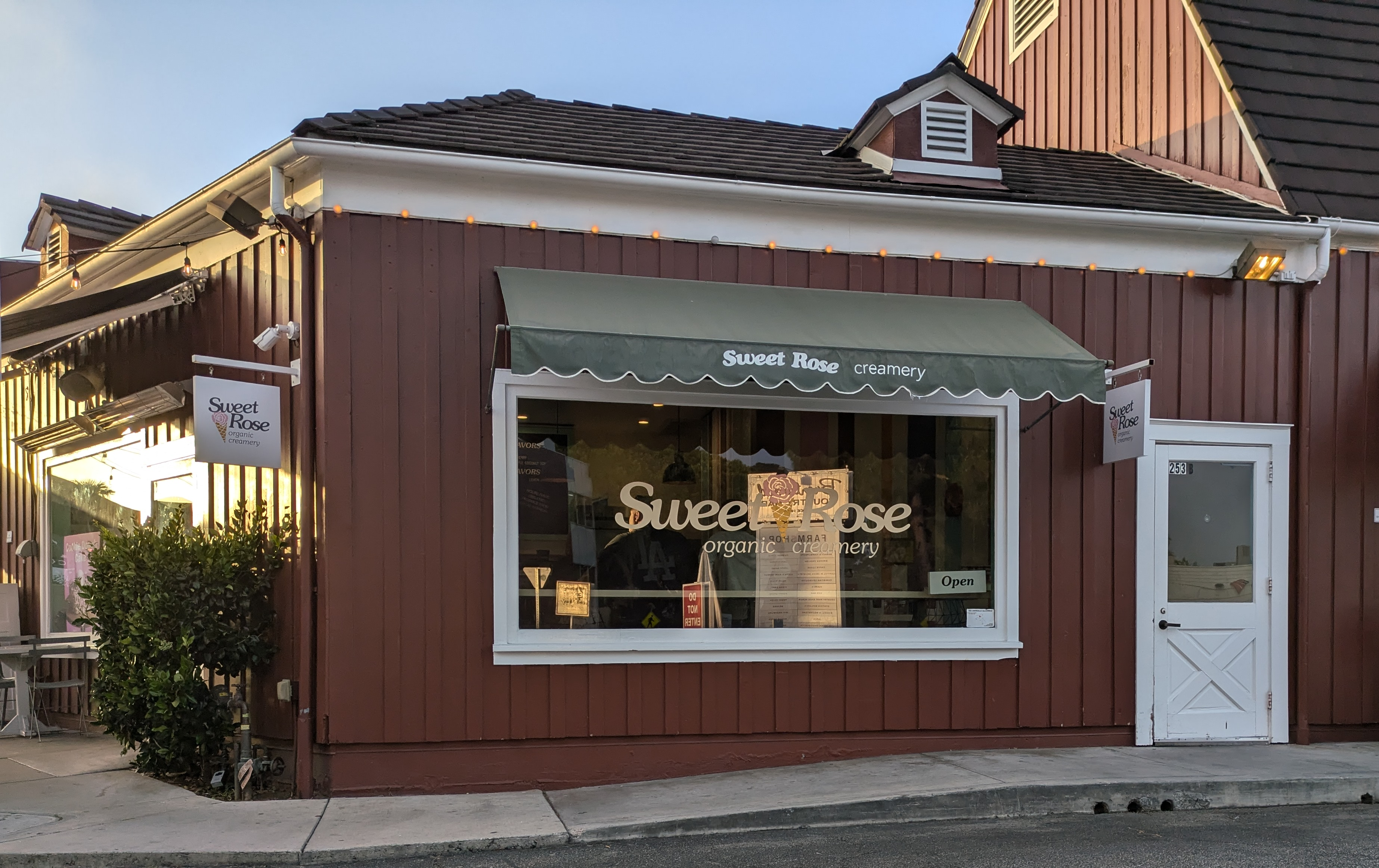
- The Brentwood Country Mart location's exterior in 2024
- Interactive map of Sweet Rose Creamery

Restaurant information
- Established: 2010
- Owners: Josh Loeb, Zoe Nathan, Shiho Yoshikawa
- Chef: Shiho Yoshikawa
- Location: California, United States
- Coordinates: 34.04729°N 118.49039°W
- Website: www.sweetrosecreamery.com

Sweet Rose Creamery is an ice creamery based in California. It was founded by Josh Loeb and Zoe Nathan in 2010. The business has shops in the Brentwood Country Mart, on Pico Boulevard, in Pacific Palisades, and Studio City.

== Description ==
At the Pico Boulevard location in Santa Monica, there is 1,000 square feet of freezer space. The ice cream, made from scratch, is prepared by chef Shiho Yoshikawa.

=== Menu ===
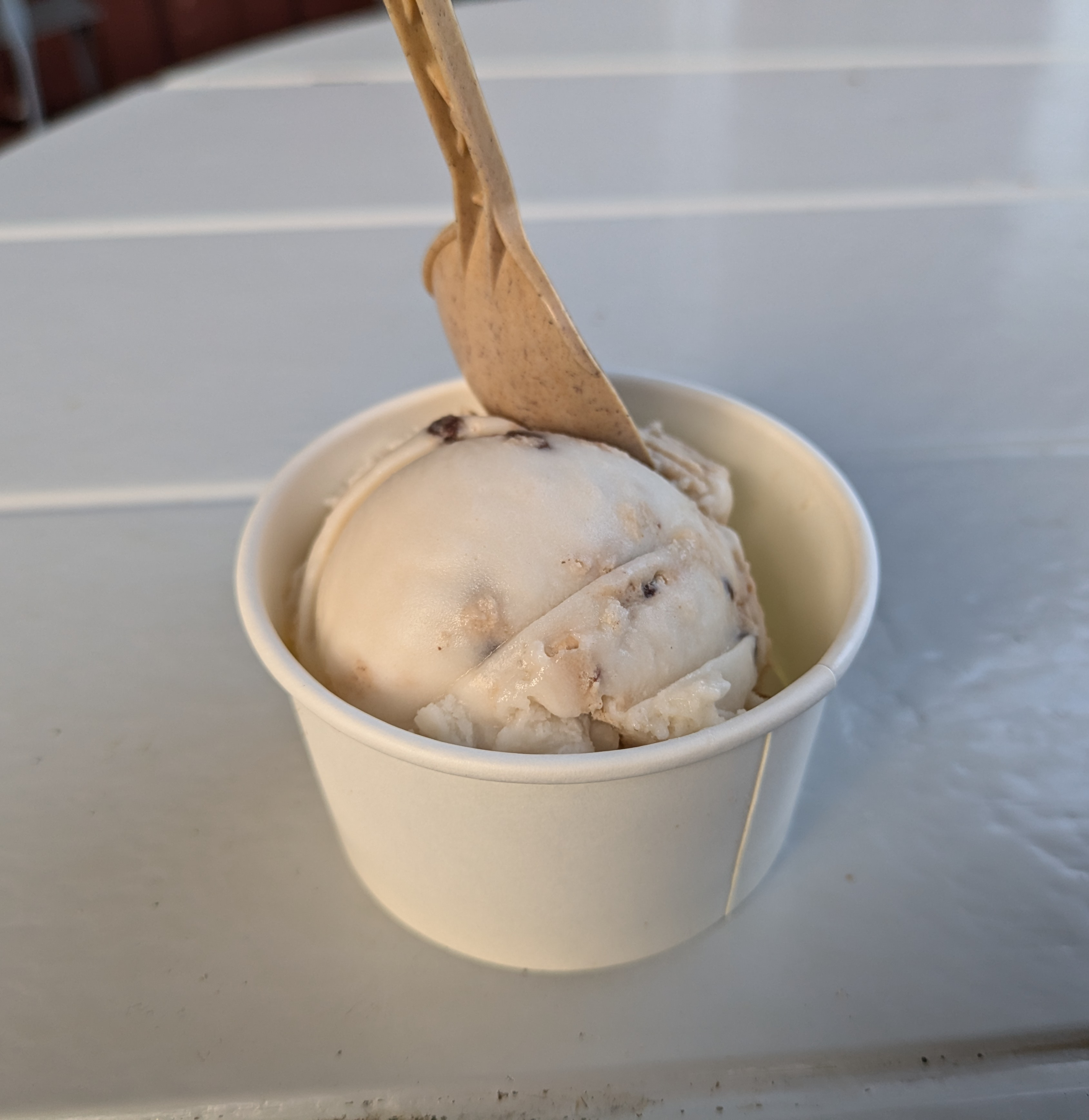
Dairy-free ice cream from Sweet Rose

In addition to ice cream and frozen yogurt, Sweet Rose Creamery serves ice cream pies as well as dairy-free foods. Brioches and scones are exclusive to the Pico Boulevard location. The ice cream is kosher and GMO-free, and flavors include the Caffe Latte Chip.

== History ==
On September 21, 2013, Sweet Rose Creamery opened on Pico Boulevard in Santa Monica. On August 19, 2015, a fourth location was opened in Pacific Palisades. On October 6, 2015, a fifth location was opened in Tujunga Village, Studio City. On March 5, 2018, a sixth location was opened.

== Reception ==
Time Out listed Sweet Rose Creamery among the "best ice cream in Los Angeles".

== See also ==
- List of ice cream parlor chains
