= Amorini =

Amorino may refer to:

- Palazzo Bolognini Amorini Salina, a Renaissance architecture palace in the center of Bologna, Italy
- Paolo Amorini (born 1937), Italian rower
- A putto representing a cupid

== See also ==
- Amorino (disambiguation)
