= Tipsy Scoop =

Ice cream brand and chain of parlors

- Website: tipsyscoop.com

Tipsy Scoop is an ice cream company. It was established by Melissa Tavss in New York in 2013 and operates a chain of parlors.

== Description ==
The ice cream chain Tipsy Scoop offers scoops and sundaes, ice cream cake, and drinks based on alcoholic ice cream made in New York. Ice cream flavors include a non-alcoholic piña colada.

== Locations ==
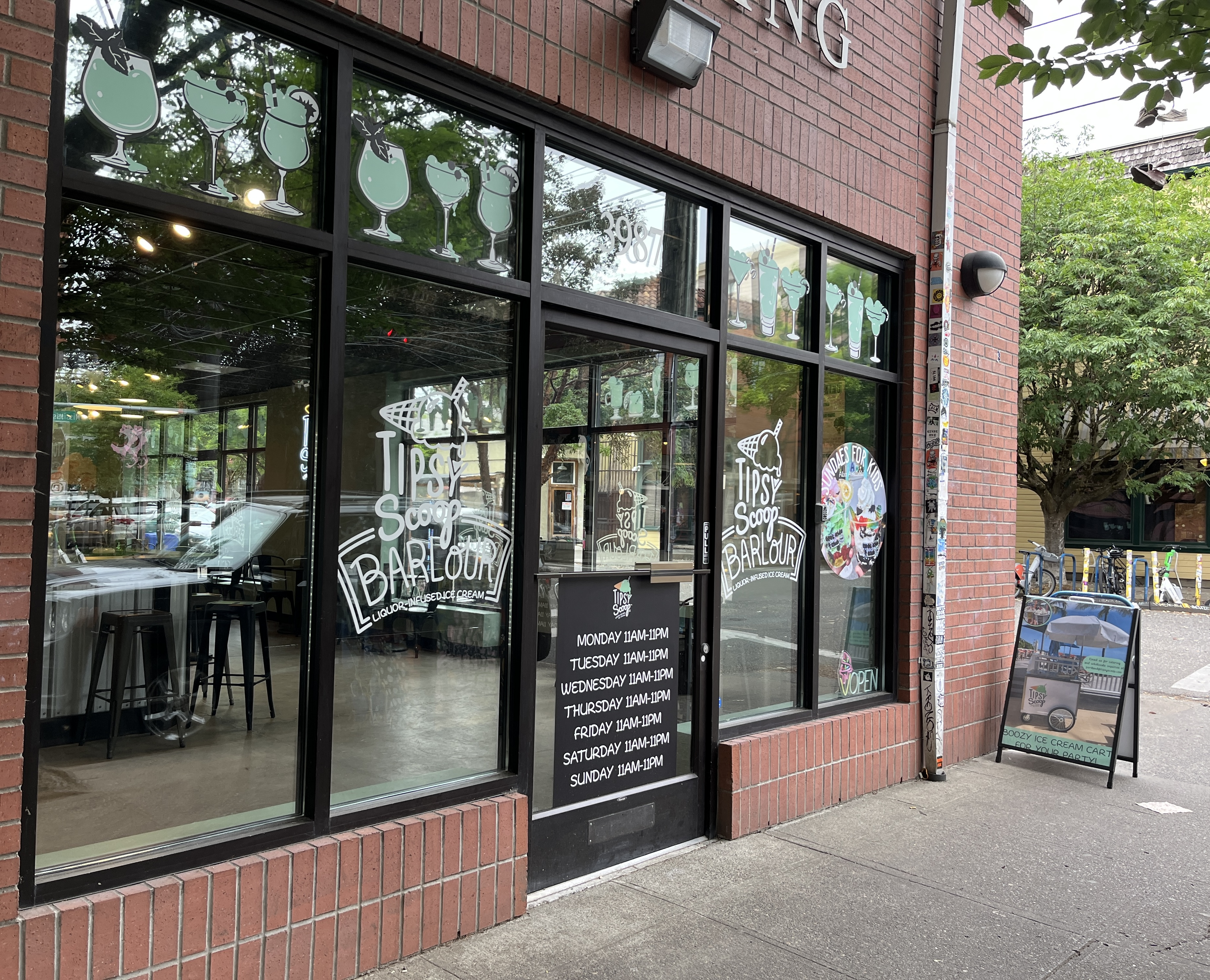
Exterior of the shop in Portland, Oregon, 2025

The business operates in Brooklyn. The location in Astoria opened in May 2024. There is also a shop in Long Beach. The location in Portland, Oregon, opened in 2025 and features a full bar. It is the chain's first shop on the West Coast. There are plans to open shops in Phoenix and Washington, D.C.

== Reception ==
Eater Portland's Zoe Baillargeon included Tipsy Scoop in a 2025 list of the city's best new restaurants and food carts.

== See also ==
- List of ice cream brands
- List of ice cream parlor chains
