= Full Tilt Ice Cream =

Chain of ice cream shops in the U.S. state of Washington

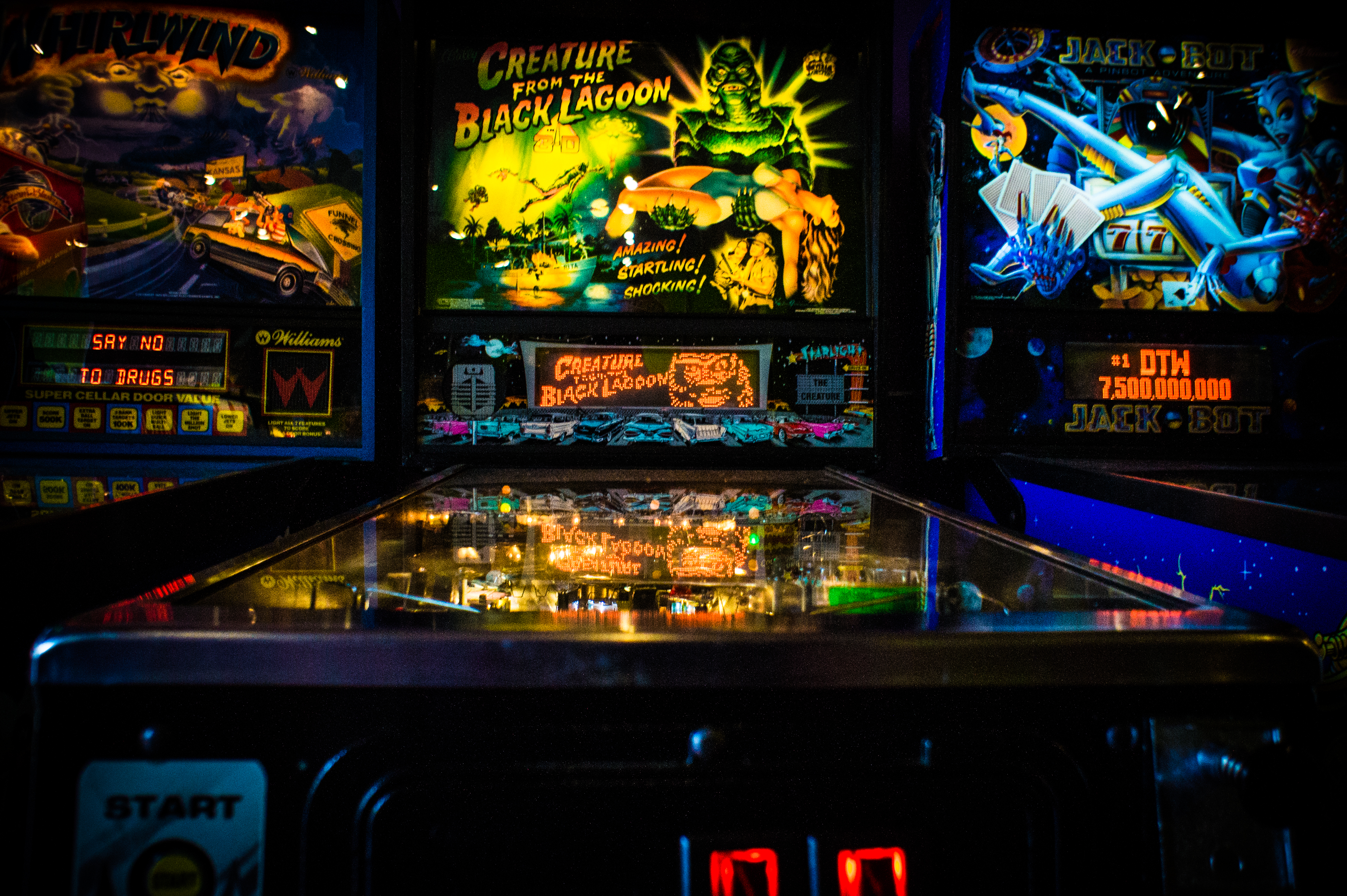
- Pinball at a Full Tilt Ice Cream shop

Restaurant information
- Established: 2008
- Owner: Ann Magyar
- Previous owner: Justin Cline
- Food type: Ice cream
- Location: Washington, United States

Full Tilt Ice Cream was a small chain of ice cream shops in the Seattle metropolitan area, in the U.S. state of Washington.

Established in 2008, the business has operated in Seattle's Ballard, Columbia City, and University District neighborhoods, as well as White Center. Full Tilt offers flavors inspired by international ingredients; varieties include horchata and Thai tea. Shops also have beer and pinball. The University District location was smaller and had a single video game machine, but closed along with the Ballard location in 2019.

Spouses Justin Cline and Ann Magyar started the business together. Following Cline's death in 2024, Magyar announced plans to close the White Center location and wind down Full Tilt's wholesale operations. A location in Columbia City remains open under separate ownership, sourcing its ice cream from local manufacturer Snoqualmie Ice Cream.

== See also ==
- List of ice cream parlor chains
- List of restaurant chains in the United States
