= Rossi's =

Ice cream manufacturer in Southend-on-Sea, England

Coordinates: 50°36′50″N 2°27′11″W

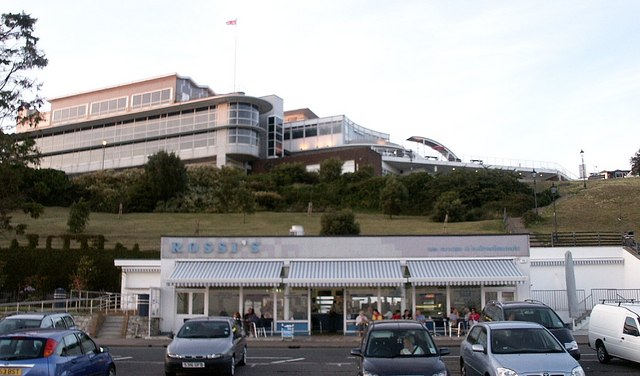
Rossi ice cream parlour in Southend-on-Sea.

Rossi's is a traditional historic ice cream parlour and ice-cream manufacturer in Southend-on-Sea, Essex, England. The Original Rossi's Ice Cream is located at 12–14 Western Esplanade, Southend-on-Sea. The Original Rossi ice cream company was brought to Southend on Sea in 1931 by Massimiliano Agostino Rossi, known as Agostino, and his wife Anna. His first shop was at 37 High Street Southend on Sea. By 1932 he had opened shops at 1 Marine Parade and 12–14 Western Esplanade. In 1937, he was joined by his wife's cousin Pietro Rossi who took over the running of the shops at Marine Parade and Western Esplanade. Meanwhile, Massimiliano opened another shop at 99 Southend High Street. The main ice cream maker was an Italian chap called Oustie and worked for the Rossi family for more than thirty years. Roger Branch and Tony Rossi were close friends for many years, and it was Roger who came up with the idea for the logo “have a Rossi”.

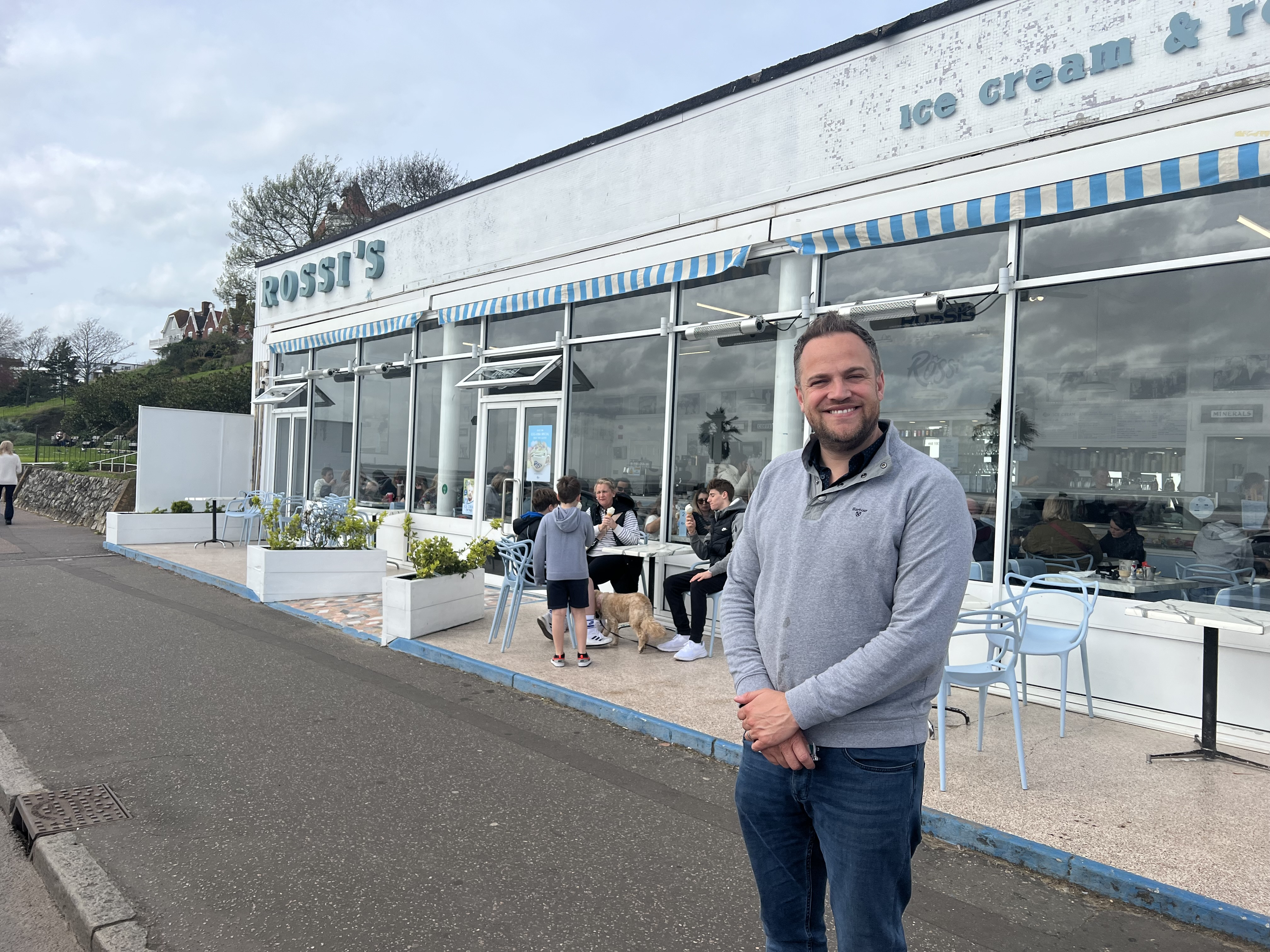
James Sinclair pictured outside the Rossi Parlour in Southend-on-Sea, Essex, in April 2024.

As of April 2021, Rossi Ice cream (Southend-on-Sea) Ltd is owned by Essex-based entrepreneur James Sinclair.

== History ==
In the 1920s, Fioravanti Figliolini immigrated with his brother Peter and his wife Pasqua to England from Cantù, Lombardy, north of Milan in Italy. They initially traded as the Figliolini Brothers in Newcastle upon Tyne, before joining forces with Toni Rossi another immigration entrepreneur. In 1937, they were looking for new premises and decided to establish another ice cream parlour, in four old shops. Toni never joined Fioravanti in Weymouth so Fioravantu took over the premises but remained trading under 'Rossi's'. Thus the two businesses have never been connected.

== Modern day ==
Rossi Ice Cream is still manufactured in Southend-on-Sea and supplies Rossi parlours, supermarkets, theatres and attractions around the UK. The company was part of a World Record bid in 2014, with an event at Garons Park to get the largest gathering of people eating ice cream. In 2015, the company launched their first printed containers, and started selling to supermarkets Asda and Co-operative. In January 2020, BBC programme Great British Railway Journeys with Michael Portillo featured Rossi's.

== See also ==
- List of ice cream parlor chains
