= Amorino =

Amorino may refer to:

- Amorino (gelato), an Italian gelato company
- Amorino (album), a 2003 album by Isobel Campbell
- Amorino (plural amorini), a putto representing a cupid

== See also ==
- Amorina (disambiguation)
