= Henos Amorina =

Brazilian politician

Henos Amorina is a former leader of the metalworkers of Osasco, a municipality and city in São Paulo, Brazil. He is a founding member of the Workers' Party of Brazil.
