= Ceredo, West Virginia =

City in West Virginia, US

- Town
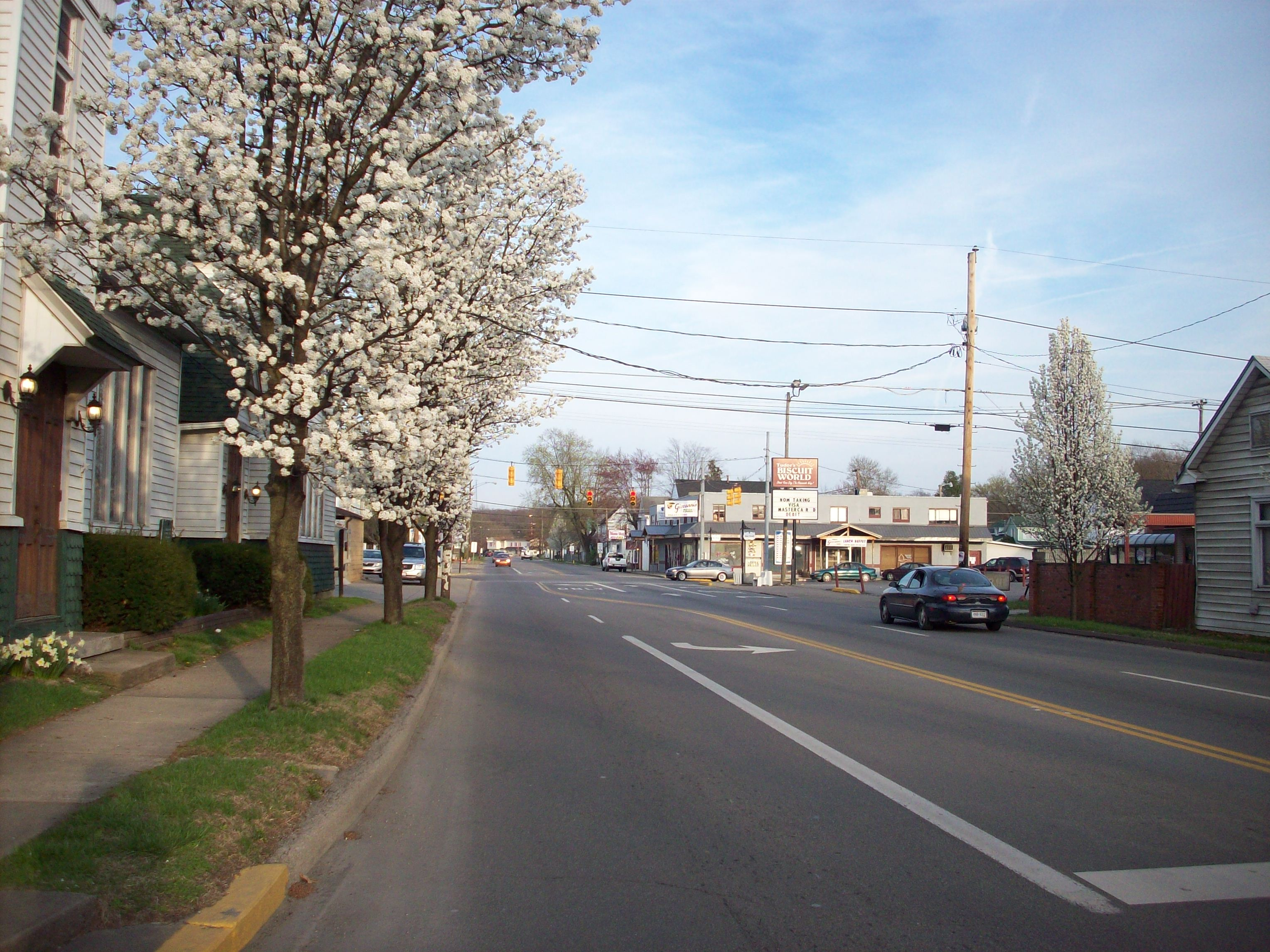
- Looking east along U.S. Route 60 from C Street

- Flag Seal Logo

- Location of Ceredo in Wayne County, West Virginia
- Coordinates: 38°23′36″N 82°33′37″W
- Country: United States
- State: West Virginia
- County: Wayne
- Established: 1857
- Incorporated: 1866

Area
  - Total: 2.04 sq mi (5.29 km^{2})
  - Land: 1.31 sq mi (3.40 km^{2})
  - Water: 0.73 sq mi (1.89 km^{2})
- Elevation: 551 ft (168 m)

Population (2020)
  - Total: 1,408
  - Density: 689.4/sq mi (266.16/km^{2})
- Time zone: UTC-5 (Eastern (EST))
  - Summer (DST): UTC-4 (EDT)
- ZIP code: 25507
- Area codes: 304, 681
- FIPS code: 54-14308
- GNIS feature ID: 1537176
- Website: ceredowv.gov

Ceredo is a town in Wayne County, West Virginia, United States, situated along the Ohio River. The population was 1,408 at the 2020 census. Ceredo is a part of the Huntington–Ashland, WV-KY-OH Metropolitan Statistical Area (MSA). As of the 2000 census, the MSA had a population of 288,649.

The city is also near the location of the Southern Airways Flight 932 aviation disaster. On November 14, 1970, a McDonnell Douglas DC-9 airplane carrying the Marshall University football team crashed on a hillside on approach to the Tri-State Airport, killing all 75 on board. A movie about the tragedy, We Are Marshall, was released in 2006.

== History ==
Ceredo was named by its founder for the bountiful harvest of corn upon the site. The name derives from Ceres, the goddess of corn and harvest.

New England Congregationalists under the American Emigrant Aid and Homestead Company founded Ceredo to demonstrate the superiority of an economic system not based on slave labor. Eli Thayer, an abolitionist congressman from Massachusetts, believed that bringing abolitionists like himself into Southern states could ultimately bring about the end of slavery. While some welcomed the newcomers, several area newspapers published opinions against this "invasion." By 1857, the city was fully established with a newspaper and several industries. Ceredo was the only town established by Thayer and the Homestead Company due to financial issues.

With John Brown's raid at Harpers Ferry in 1859 and the outbreak of the Civil War in 1861, the situation for this abolitionist colony appeared bleak. Its purpose to bring about the peaceful end of slavery over, several residents volunteered for pro-Union regiments. The town would become the station point for the Union 5th West Virginia Infantry, until they were stationed elsewhere and the town was devastated by guerilla raids. By the end of the war, much of the industry had been destroyed and a majority of the northern emigrants had fled. Thayer eventually transferred ownership of the town to Congressmen Charles B. Hoard. Hoard and his descendants rebuilt Ceredo into a small town, although the community never reached the original vision of Thayer and the Homestead Company. The Southern natives maintained a strong majority in the town, as the Northern migrants had mostly left during the war.

== Geography ==
According to the United States Census Bureau, the city has a total area of 2.26 square miles (5.85 km^{2}), of which 1.53 square miles (3.96 km^{2}) is land and 0.73 square miles (1.89 km^{2}) is water.

=== Climate ===
The climate in this area is characterized by hot, humid summers and generally mild to cool winters. According to the Köppen Climate Classification system, Ceredo has a humid subtropical climate, abbreviated "Cfa" on climate maps.

== Demographics ==
Historical population
Census	Pop.	Note	%±
1880	462		—
1890	923		99.8%
1900	1,279		38.6%
1910	1,215		−5.0%
1920	1,110		−8.6%
1930	1,164		4.9%
1940	1,212		4.1%
1950	1,399		15.4%
1960	1,387		−0.9%
1970	1,583		14.1%
1980	2,255		42.5%
1990	1,916		−15.0%
2000	1,675		−12.6%
2010	1,450		−13.4%
2020	1,408		−2.9%

A Little League baseball game

=== 2010 census ===
As of the census of 2010, there were 1,450 people, 638 households, and 378 families living in the city. The population density was 947.7 inhabitants per square mile (365.9/km^{2}). There were 718 housing units at an average density of 469.3 per square mile (181.2/km^{2}). The racial makeup of the city was 98.2% White, 0.1% African American, 0.3% Native American, 0.1% Asian, 0.1% from other races, and 1.2% from two or more races. Hispanic or Latino of any race were 0.8% of the population.

There were 638 households, of which 20.7% had children under the age of 18 living with them, 40.9% were married couples living together, 12.4% had a female householder with no husband present, 6.0% had a male householder with no wife present, and 40.8% were non-families. 37.0% of all households were made up of individuals, and 19.6% had someone living alone who was 65 years of age or older. The average household size was 2.07 and the average family size was 2.64.

The median age in the city was 48.9 years. 16.1% of residents were under the age of 18; 10.5% were between the ages of 18 and 24; 19.1% were from 25 to 44; 27.7% were from 45 to 64; and 26.6% were 65 years of age or older. The gender makeup of the city was 42.6% male and 57.4% female.

=== 2000 census ===
As of the census of 2000, there were 1,675 people, 821 households, and 466 families living in the city. The population density was 1,246.5 people per square mile (482.6/km^{2}). There were 888 housing units at an average density of 660.8 per square mile (255.9/km^{2}). The racial makeup of the city was 97.73% White, 0.06% Native American, 0.78% Asian, 0.12% Pacific Islander, 0.30% from other races, and 1.01% from two or more races. Hispanic or Latino of any race were 0.90% of the population.

There were 821 households, out of which 19.0% had children under the age of 18 living with them, 43.8% were married couples living together, 10.5% had a female householder with no husband present, and 43.2% were non-families. 41.0% of all households were made up of individuals, and 23.6% had someone living alone who was 65 years of age or older. The average household size was 2.01 and the average family size was 2.69.

In the city, the population was spread out, with 17.9% under the age of 18, 7.7% from 18 to 24, 22.7% from 25 to 44, 25.6% from 45 to 64, and 26.1% who were 65 years of age or older. The median age was 46 years. For every 100 females, there were 73.0 males. For every 100 females age 18 and over, there were 68.6 males.

The median income for a household in the city was $24,323, and the median income for a family was $33,700. Males had a median income of $30,735 versus $21,615 for females. The per capita income for the city was $14,733. About 10.4% of families and 15.0% of the population were below the poverty line, including 9.0% of those under age 18 and 13.6% of those age 65 or over.

== Arts and culture ==
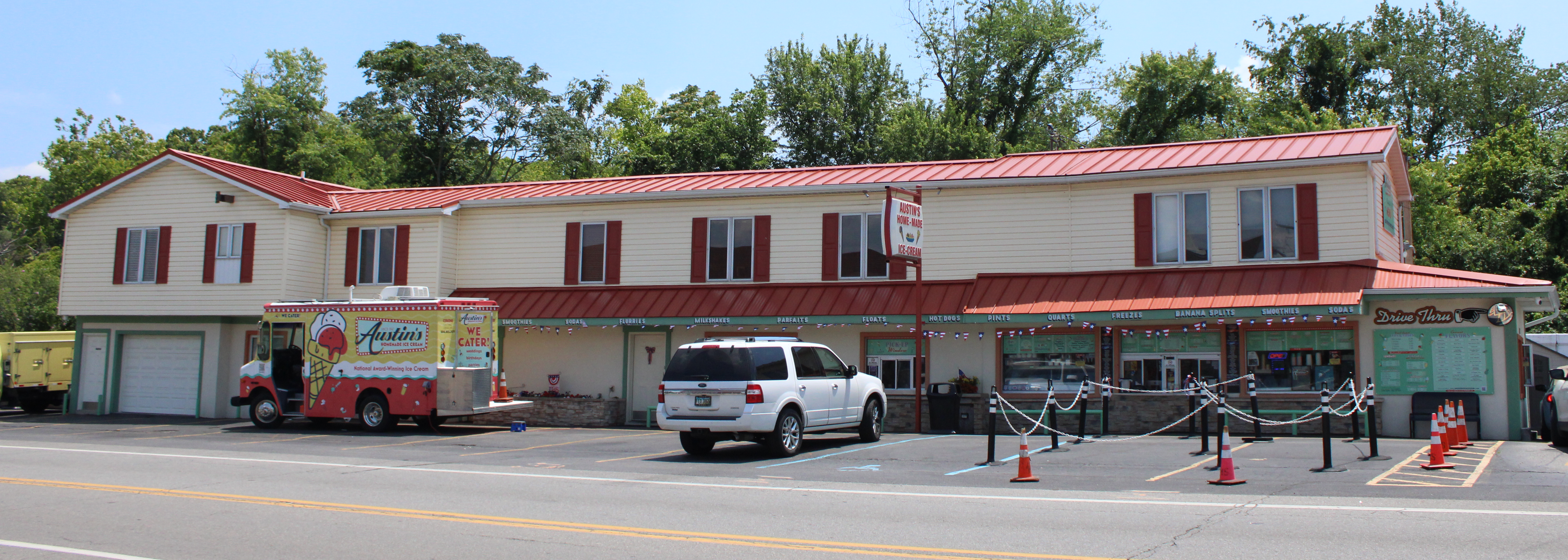
Austin's Homemade Ice Cream

Austin's Homemade Ice Cream has operated in Ceredo since 1947.

== Notable people ==
- Dagmar, TV star of the 1950s; lived in Ceredo from the 1990s to the end of her life
- Charles B. Hoard, businessman and Member of the United States House of Representatives
- Beau Smith, comic book writer, publicist, columnist
- Eli Thayer, Member of the United States House of Representatives and founder of Ceredo
- James Dixon Williams, Hollywood movie pioneer and co-founder of First National Pictures; was born in Ceredo circa 1877

== See also ==
- List of cities and towns along the Ohio River
