= Twistee Treat =

Chain of ice cream restaurants

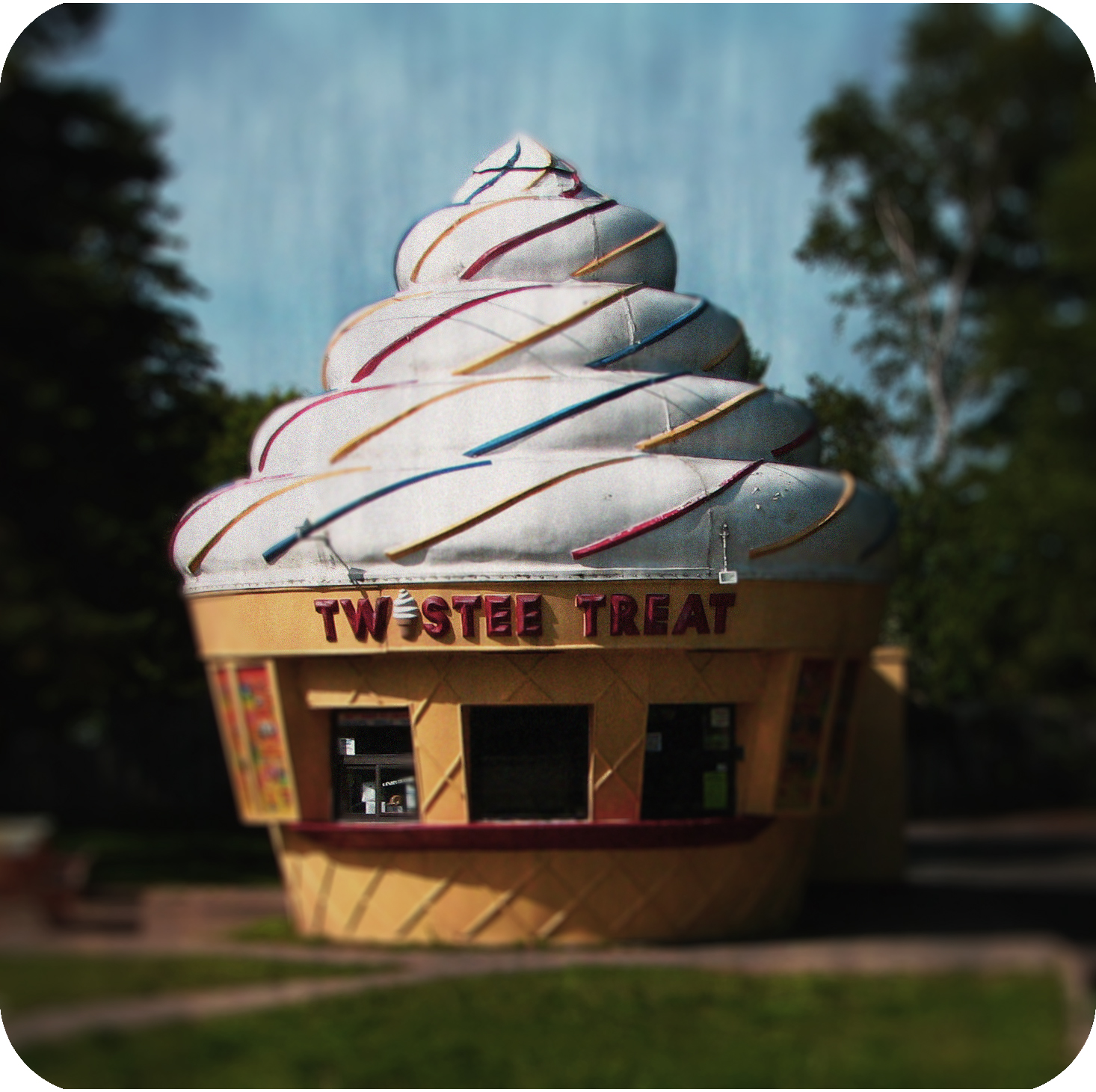
- Minden, Ontario Twistee Treat restaurant
- Industry: Food and beverage
- Genre: Ice cream parlor
- Founded: Original company: 1983; 43 years ago North Fort Myers, Florida, U.S. Twistee Treat USA: 2010; 16 years ago
- Founder: Original company: Robert G. "Skip" Skinner; Twistee Treat USA: Rashid A. Khatib and Zahi W. Khouri
- Headquarters: Orlando, Florida, U.S., U.S.
- Number of locations: 40+
- Products: Ice cream, soft serve, milkshakes, slushies
- Owner: Intram Investments
- Website: twisteetreat.com

Twistee Treat is a corporate owned chain of ice cream restaurants, founded in 1983 in North Fort Myers, Florida. The restaurants are characterized by buildings shaped in the form of soft-serve ice cream cones. The company is currently expanding throughout the Orlando and Tampa markets, building new stores. Corporate stores are marked with a chocolate dip and LED colored "sprinkles" on the roof of the cone.

== History ==
The original Twistee Treat was a franchised chain of ice cream restaurants, founded in 1983 in North Fort Myers, Florida. The restaurants are characterized by buildings shaped in the form of soft-serve ice cream cones.

The original company, which had 23 locations in Florida, went into bankruptcy after a failed IPO in 1983. A new Twistee Treat company, based in Orlando, Florida, was formed in 1996. As of 1999, the new company had 35 locations in Florida and Missouri. The company also sold a franchise to a Chatham, Ontario-based company that year.

In 2010 a new company, Twistee Treat USA, formed by Intram Investments, an Orlando-based investment firm, began building new stores.

== Bankruptcy and original franchises ==
When the original and subsequently the second parent company for Twistee Treat ceased operations, the rights to the name and building were handed over to the individual franchisees.

== Twistee Treat USA ==
In 2010 Twistee Treat USA acquired the patents and rights to the company. They began building new stores under the Twistee Treat name, utilizing old buildings purchased from previous franchisees. A new building design was also created and will be used for future company expansion.

== Existing stores owned by previous franchisees ==
While all new Twistee Treat stores are corporate owned, several privately owned stores from the previous corporations still operate around the US. These currently existing stores were granted the rights to use the name and building design, and are allowed to operate as they are. The menu items at privately owned stores can differ from corporate outlets, for example in lacking the famous brownie boat. New buildings under the Twistee Treat banner are corporate owned.
