= Austin's Homemade Ice Cream =

Ice cream parlor in Ceredo, West Virginia, US

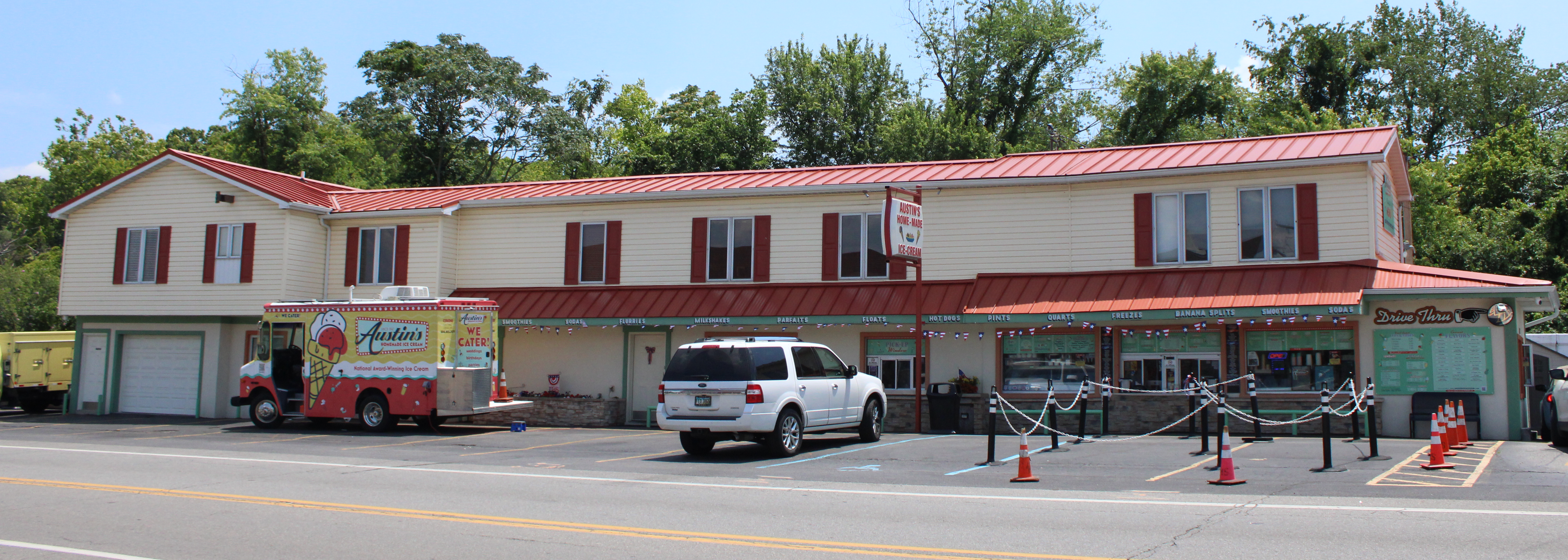
- Austin's Homemade Ice Cream in 2025
- Interactive map of Austin's Homemade Ice Cream

Restaurant information
- Established: 1947
- Food type: Ice Cream
- Location: 1103 C Street, Ceredo, Wayne, West Virginia, USA
- Coordinates: 38°23′45″N 82°33′16″W
- Other locations: Huntington, West Virginia
- Website: www.austinsicecream.com

Austin's Homemade Ice Cream is an ice cream parlor located in Ceredo, West Virginia, with a secondary location in Huntington, West Virginia.

== History ==
Austin's Homemade Ice Cream opened its first location in Ceredo, West Virginia in 1947. In 1983, the business was purchased by Joyce Snyder. Snyder's daughter and two grandchildren currently operate it: Kim Adkins, Tim Ruff, and Taylor Strickland Chambers. New locations were opened up in Huntington, West Virginia, in 2018, and Barboursville, West Virginia, in 2026.

== Recognition ==
| Year | Award | Organization | Note |
|---|---|---|---|
| 2021 | Best New Ice Cream Flavor of the Year | North American Ice Cream Association | Campfire S’mores/S’more Than a Feeling - Southern Region |
| 2021 | Best Ice Cream in West Virginia | Food & Wine | |
| 2024 | Dairy Free Flavor of the Year | North American Ice Cream Association | Apple Cinnamon Oatmeal |
| 2024 | Best Ice Cream in West Virginia | Reader's Digest | |
