= Mashti Malone's =

Food chain in California (founded 1980)

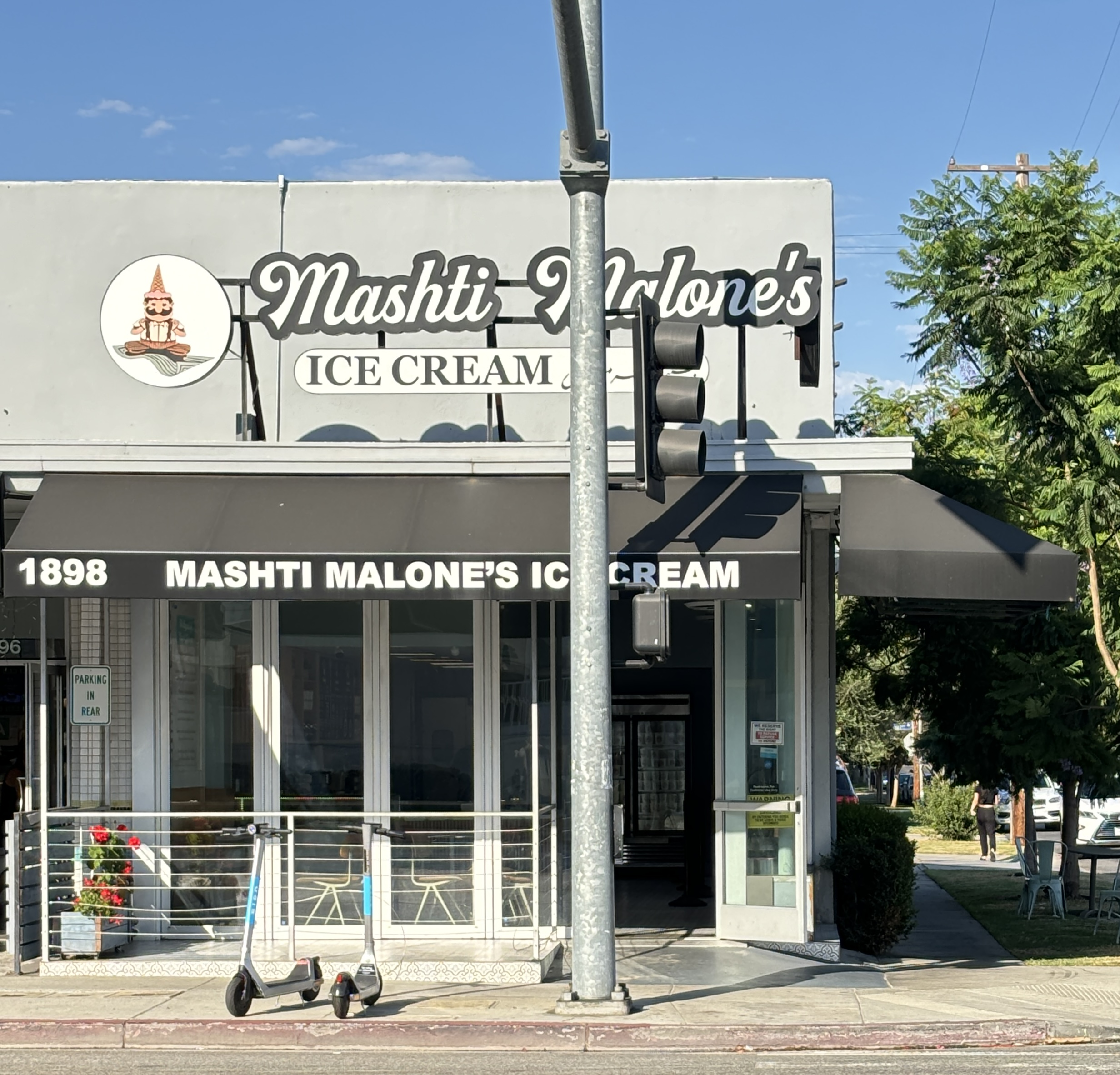
Mashti Malone's in Westwood, Los Angeles

Mashti Malone's is a chain of Persian-style ice cream parlors founded in 1980 and located in Los Angeles, California.

== History ==
Born in Mashhad, Iran, brothers Mashti and Mehdi Shirvani own Mashti Malone's. Mashti purchased the parlor, at the time called Mugsy Malone, in 1980. He did not have enough money to fully change the business's name, hence he exchanged "Mugsy" for "Mashti" and left the "Malone."

Initially, Mashti and Mehdi sold their ice cream wholesale to more than 300 Persian and Armenian restaurants. Demand grew, and the Food Channel did a story on the business. It was then that the Shirvanis began an ice cream mail-order service within the United States. In 2002, they opened their own ice cream plant in Garden Grove, with the capacity of producing 2,000 gallons of ice cream daily.

The business eventually expanded to included Griffith Park, Westwood, and Glendale branches, in addition to the original Hollywood location.

== Flavors ==
- Creamy Rosewater
- Saffron Rosewater
- Ginger Rosewater
- French Lavender
- Rosewater Sorbet
- Orange Blossom
- Persian Cucumber
- Raspberry Sorbet
- Banana Walnut
- Black Cherry
- Butter Pecan
- Chocolate
- Chocolate Chip
- Cookies and Cream
- Coconut Pineapple
- Date
- Dulce de Leche
- Mint Chocolate Chip
- Matcha Green Tea
- Mocha Almond Fudge
- Peanut Butter Cup
- Pistachio Almond
- Pralines and Almond
- Rocky Road
- Pomegranate Sorbet
- Herbal Snow Sorbet
- Turkish Coffee
- Alphonso Mango
- Organic Green Tea
