= Amorino (gelato) =

French brand of Italian gelato

- Logo used since 2002.

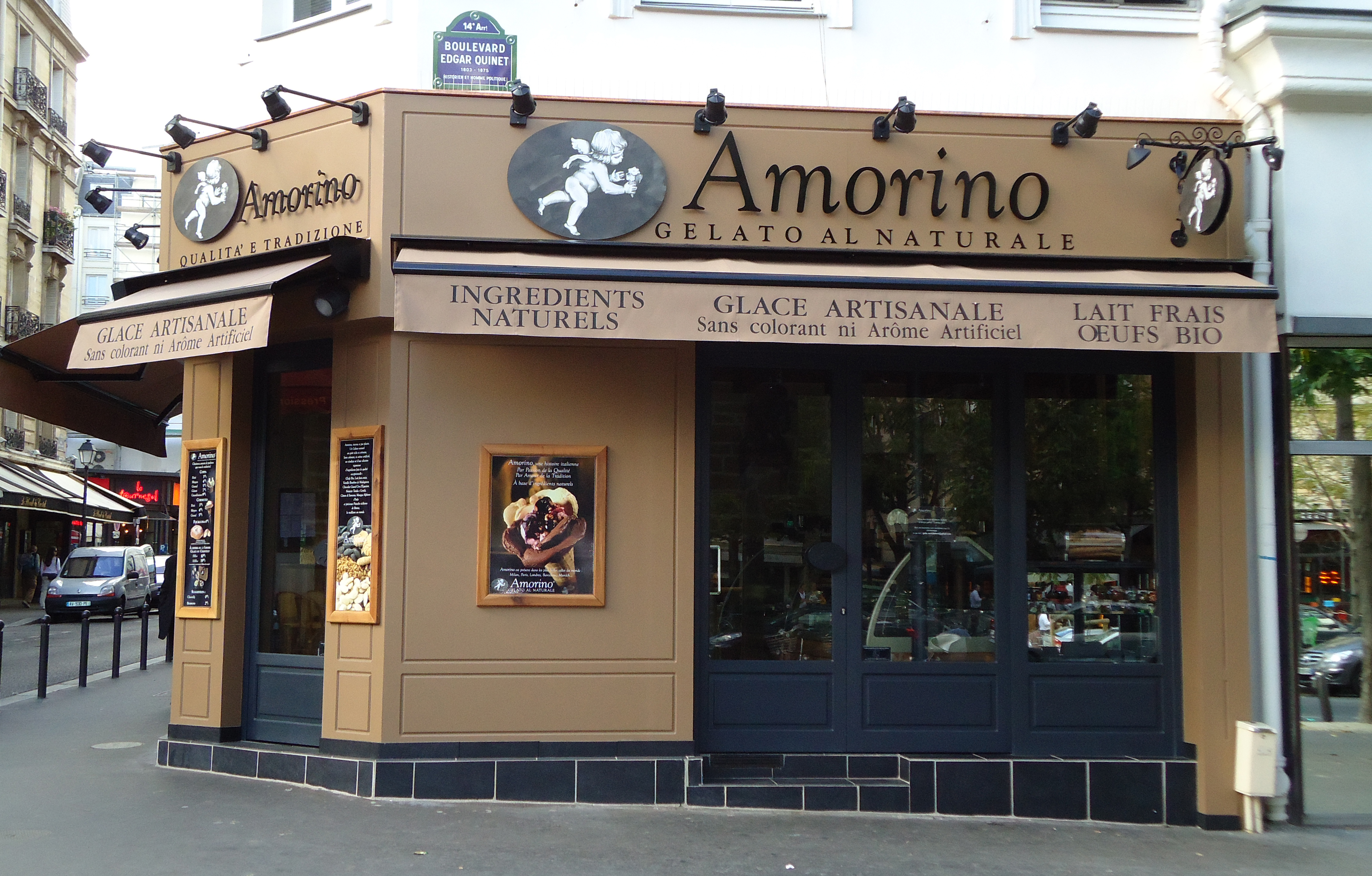
- Branch at Boulevard Edgar Quinet, Paris
- Company type: Private
- Industry: Gelato
- Founded: 2002; 24 years ago
- Founder: Cristiano Sereni; Paolo Benassi
- Headquarters: France
- Number of locations: 315
- Area served: 22 countries
- Products: Gelato Macarons Crepes Waffles Coffee beverages
- Website: http://www.amorino.com

Amorino is a French multinational chain of gelato boutiques headquartered outside of Paris, France. The company was founded in 2002 by Cristiano Sereni and Paolo Benassi, two childhood friends from Reggio Emilia.

The first boutique opened on Île Saint-Louis in 2002, and offers gelato and sorbetto made according to Italian tradition. As of July 2021, the company had more than 250 stores in Europe, Asia, the United States, and Mexico and typically serves gelato in the shape of a flower. Amorino boutiques additionally offer macarons, crêpes, waffles, tarts, milkshakes, and Italian-style coffee.

== History ==
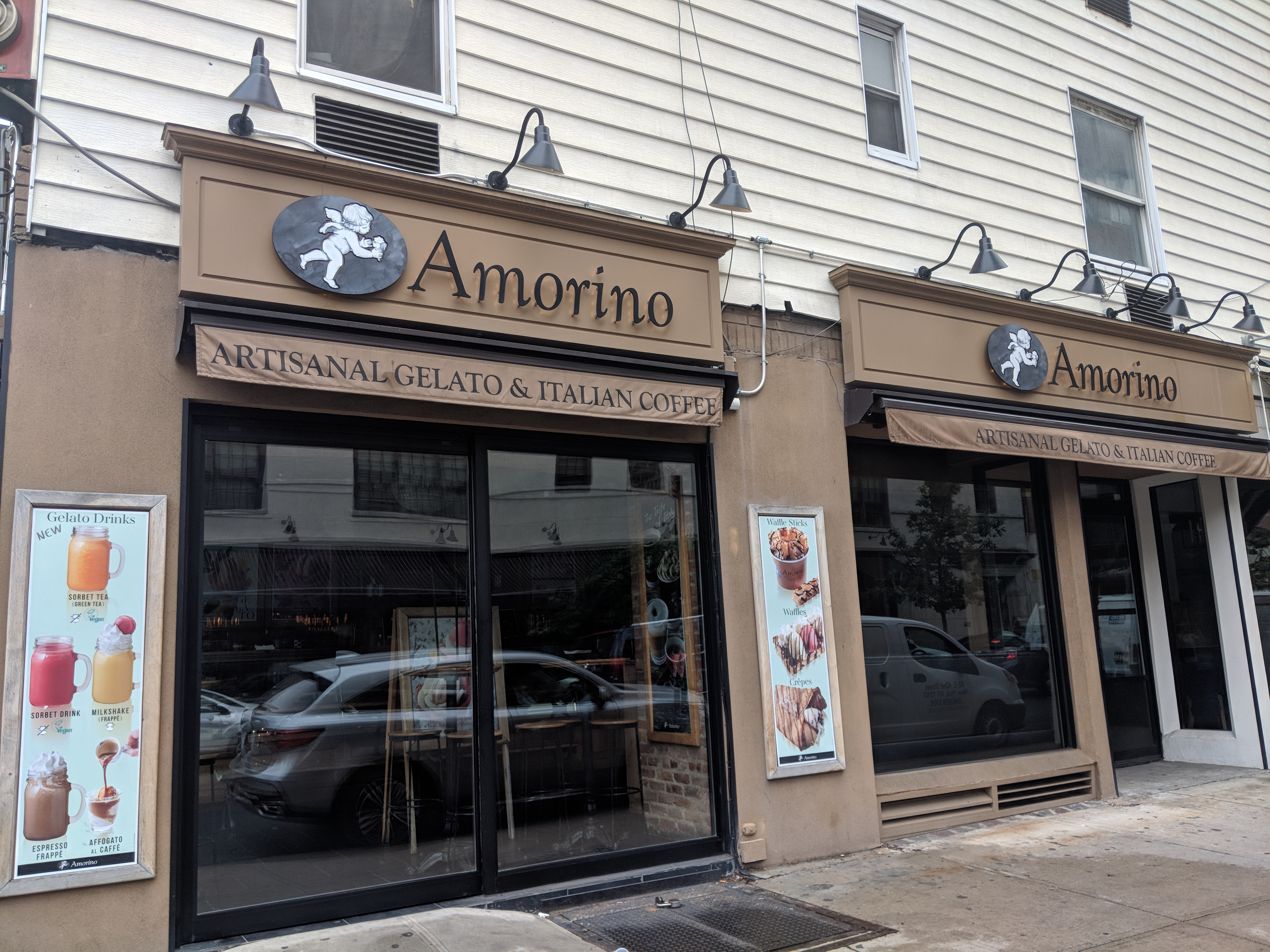
Storefront of Amorino's Chelsea location

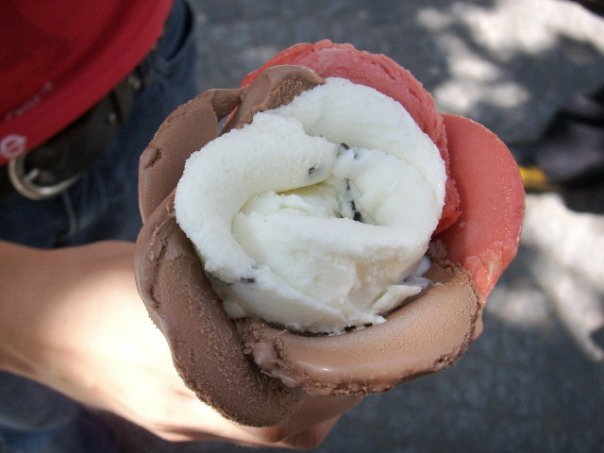
Speciality Amorino gelato Cornet

- The first Amorino boutique opened in 2002 on the Île Saint-Louis in Paris, France.
- In 2005, gelato production was centralized in one laboratory.
- In 2006, the franchise-based expansion was launched.
- In 2009, the first boutique outside of France opened.
- In 2011, headquarters and the central laboratory were relocated to Orly, France. This year also marked the expansion of Amorino to the U.S. in New York.
- In 2015, all Amorino sorbets received the Vegan Society certification.
- In 2016, Amorino opened the 150th boutique in Playa del Carmen, Mexico on the Quinta Avenida.
- In 2017, all gelato and sorbets became gluten-free.
- In 2019, Amorino opened its 18th market.
- In 2020, Amorino opened the 200th store, again in Mexico, on the iconic Angel of Independence roundabouts in Mexico City.
- In 2024, Amorino opened a store in Amsterdam, The Netherlands, and another store in the ground floor of El Fuerte Hotel in Marbella.
- In 2025, Amorino opened another store in Lincoln Center in New York City, bringing the total number of stores worldwide to more than 300
