= Lappert's =

American ice cream manufacturer

Lappert's is a name associated with two separate ice cream businesses that originated from a company founded in 1983 on the island of Kauai, Hawaii. The original business was established by Walter Lappert and his wife, Mary Pratt, who were involved in the company’s early development.

The first batches of ice cream were produced in Hanapepe, Kauai in December 1983, with an emphasis on high butterfat content and premium ingredients. The business later expanded to include coffee roasting and baked goods.

Around 1990, the original business was divided into two independently operated entities.

Lappert’s Hawaii, based on Kauai and led by Mary Pratt since 1990, operates retail stores and production facilities within the Hawaiian Islands, producing ice cream, coffee, and bakery items.

A separate mainland company, operated by Michael Lappert, produces and distributes Lappert’s-branded products in the continental United States. The two companies operate independently, with separate ownership, management, and product development. .
