= Kline's Dairy Bar =

Virginia ice cream shop

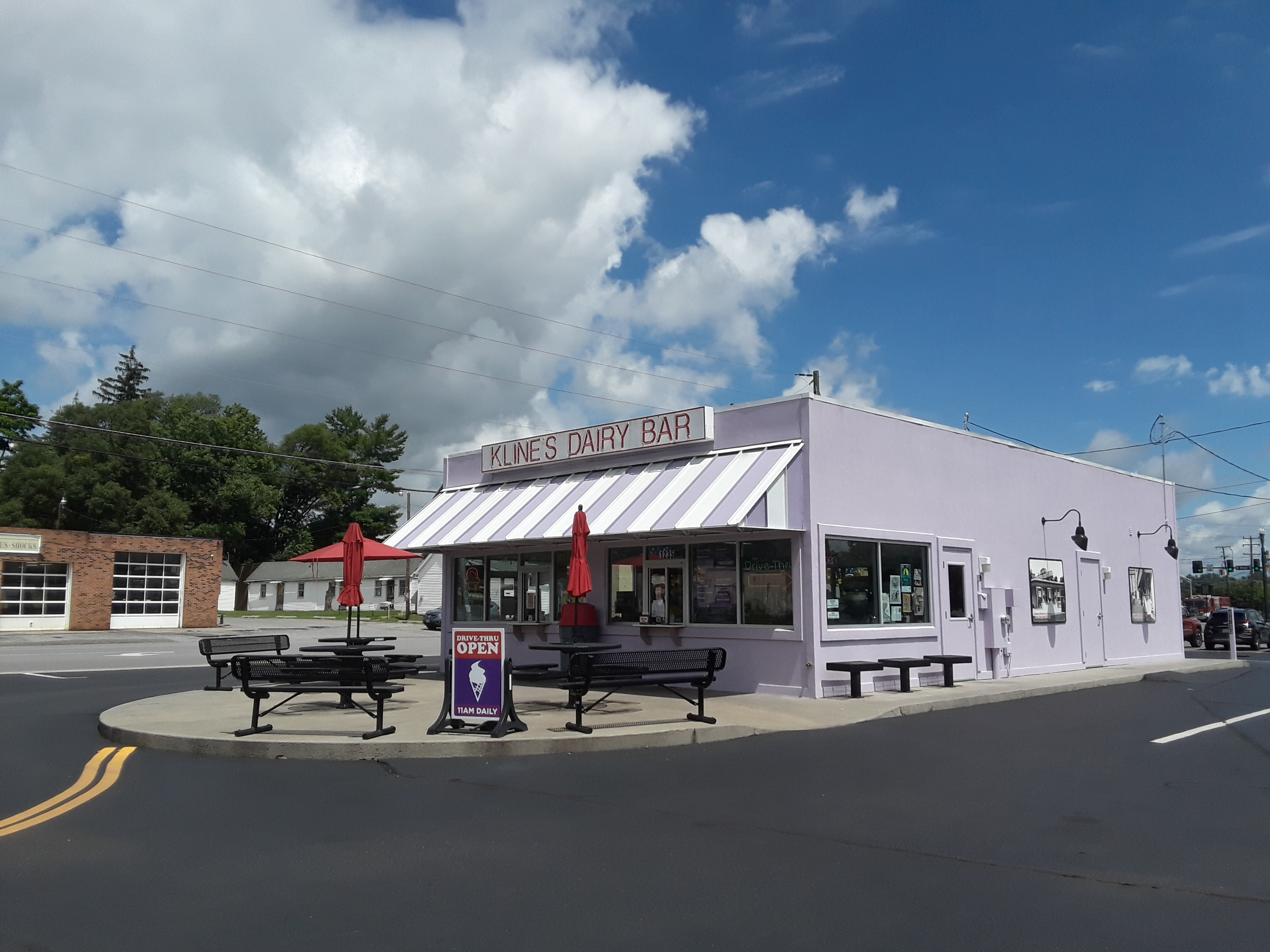
The Kline's location in Waynesboro, Virginia, in July 2023

Kline's Dairy Bar is a small ice cream shop with six locations in Virginia, United States. It was established in 1943 in downtown Harrisonburg in the Klines' family home. After the death of owner John Kline, it was bought out and expanded to five other locations. It uses an old fashioned way of production called continuous freeze instead of the newer and more popular soft serve method. This means that there is less air added into the ice cream as it freezes, making for a denser product more like old-fashioned frozen custard. Since this means of production takes more time, the shops only make three flavors a week. They update their customers on the flavors using their website and their Twitter account.

== History ==
John Kline asked for help from his father, Grover Kline, in 1943 to help him start Kline's Frozen Custard. They first started selling their product in their home, having customers come up to a window in their house. John then married Bess, who worked across the street at the dry cleaners. She worked the window for years, getting to know the customers and becoming the face of the shop.

When John Kline died in 1974, Bess sold the business to Sam Fletcher. Bess continued to work under Fletcher until he sold the business to Mike Arehart in 1979, who purchased it with significant financial backing from his father, Dick Arehart. Bess stayed a part of the team to teach Arehart the ropes. Arehart owns the two locations in Harrisonburg and has remained loyal to the beliefs of the business throughout the years. “Arehart carries on a tradition of premium ice cream that began in 1943 when Bess and John Kline first opened their ice cream shop”.

Mike Arehart's sister Kim Arehart returned from college in 1979, wanting to work in the business. She brought Kline's to a new location, Staunton, Virginia, in 1997. In 2008 she expanded to add a new store in Waynesboro, Virginia. In 2022, Kim Arehart and Kathleen Peterson opened a location in Lynchburg, Virginia; two years later, they established a Kline's in Chesterfield, Virginia. Mike Arehart still owns the two locations in Harrisonburg, while Kim owns the Waynesboro location and co-owns the two newest stores. Peterson purchased the Staunton location in Staunton and co-owns the Lynchburg and Chesterfield.

Both have stayed with the original style of production. Kim explains that this old-fashioned production is what sets them apart: "I couldn't turn my back on the Kline's tradition ... This is our niche, we understand it, and we've gotten very good at it."

== Production ==
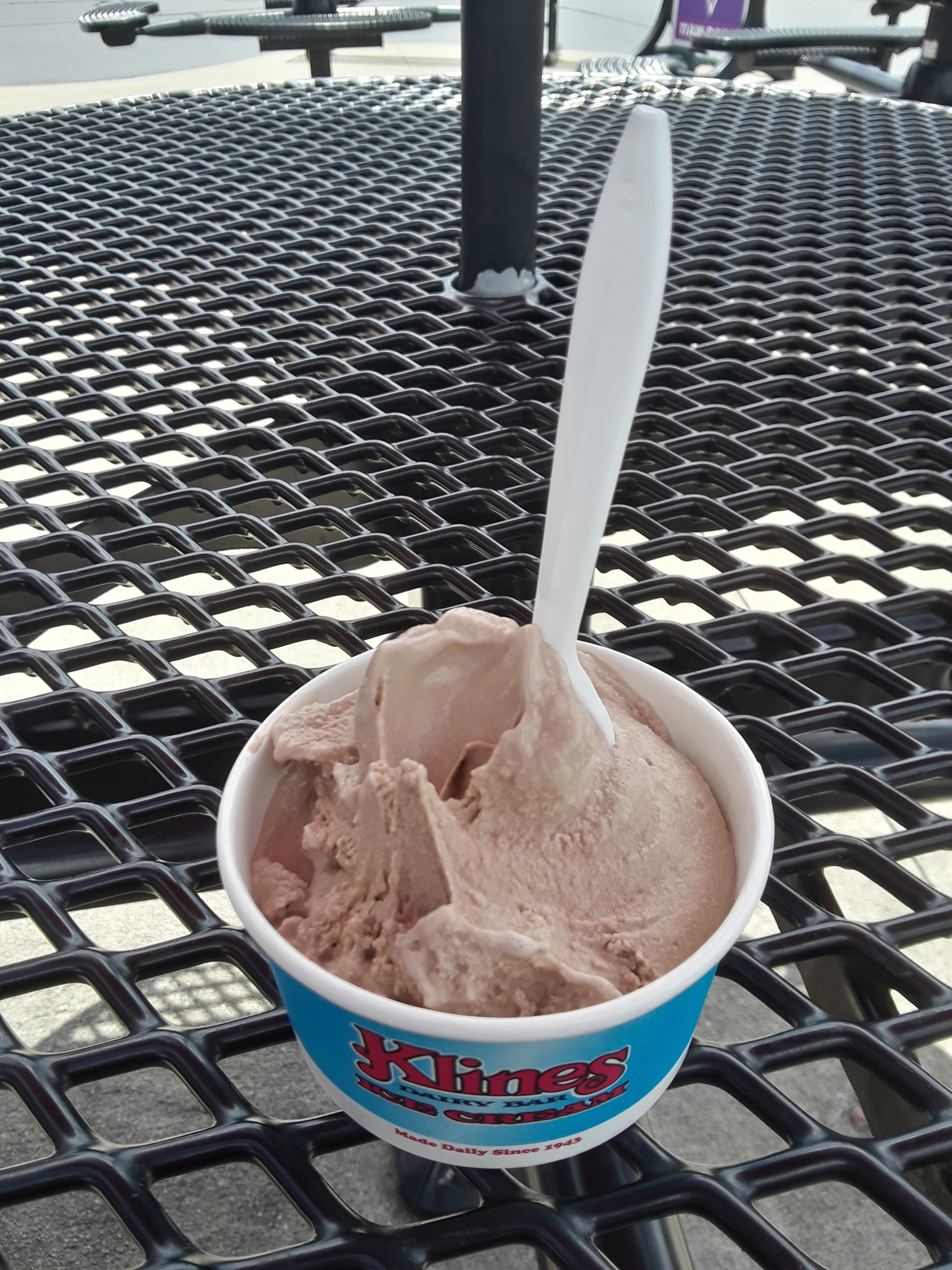
A cup of chocolate frozen custard from Kline's

The continuous freeze method of producing ice cream is nearly obsolete along the east coast. Although popular in some parts of the Midwest, particularly Milwaukee, the custard-like continuous freeze ice cream is a rarity in Virginia and most of the U.S. In this method, the ice cream is frozen and mixed at the same time, with little air added during this process. The more popular soft-serve method of production churns the ice cream, then adds a substantial amount of air while it is being frozen. The soft serve method allows for larger batches to be made at one time and produces a lighter, air-filled consistency. Bigger ice cream chains such as Dairy Queen use this soft serve method.

Because Kline's does not use this method, they make smaller batches and cannot work as efficiently as chain businesses. Kline's product is denser since there is less air added into the mixture. "It also means more milk, fruit and flavoring in every cup or cone." Each batch of continuous freeze ice cream takes about two minutes from start to finish. However, this does not make as much product as the conventional soft serve method. With continuous freeze, very little air is added as the machines slowly push out the final product, making only about 10 gallons an hour. Despite the time and effort this method takes, Kline's makes ice cream fresh every day. In order to make up for the time of production, they only make three flavors every week and have a rather rushed atmosphere.

== Flavors ==
Because Kline's makes their ice cream every morning and it takes so long to make, they have one special flavor a week. They always make chocolate and vanilla, and rotate in this special flavor. This creates a way for them to compete with the chain ice cream sellers. They choose not to mix flavors but to keep these three simple flavors as well as milkshakes and sundaes. The special flavor of the week is chosen from 12 regulars, including peanut butter, black raspberry, and Oreo. It is posted on the Klein's website, Twitter page, and a sign outside.

This fast pace and simple menu continues through their service. Customers order at a walk-up service window, similar to the one in John Kline's family home in 1943. They can then sit on nearby benches and tables.

== Hog Wild ==
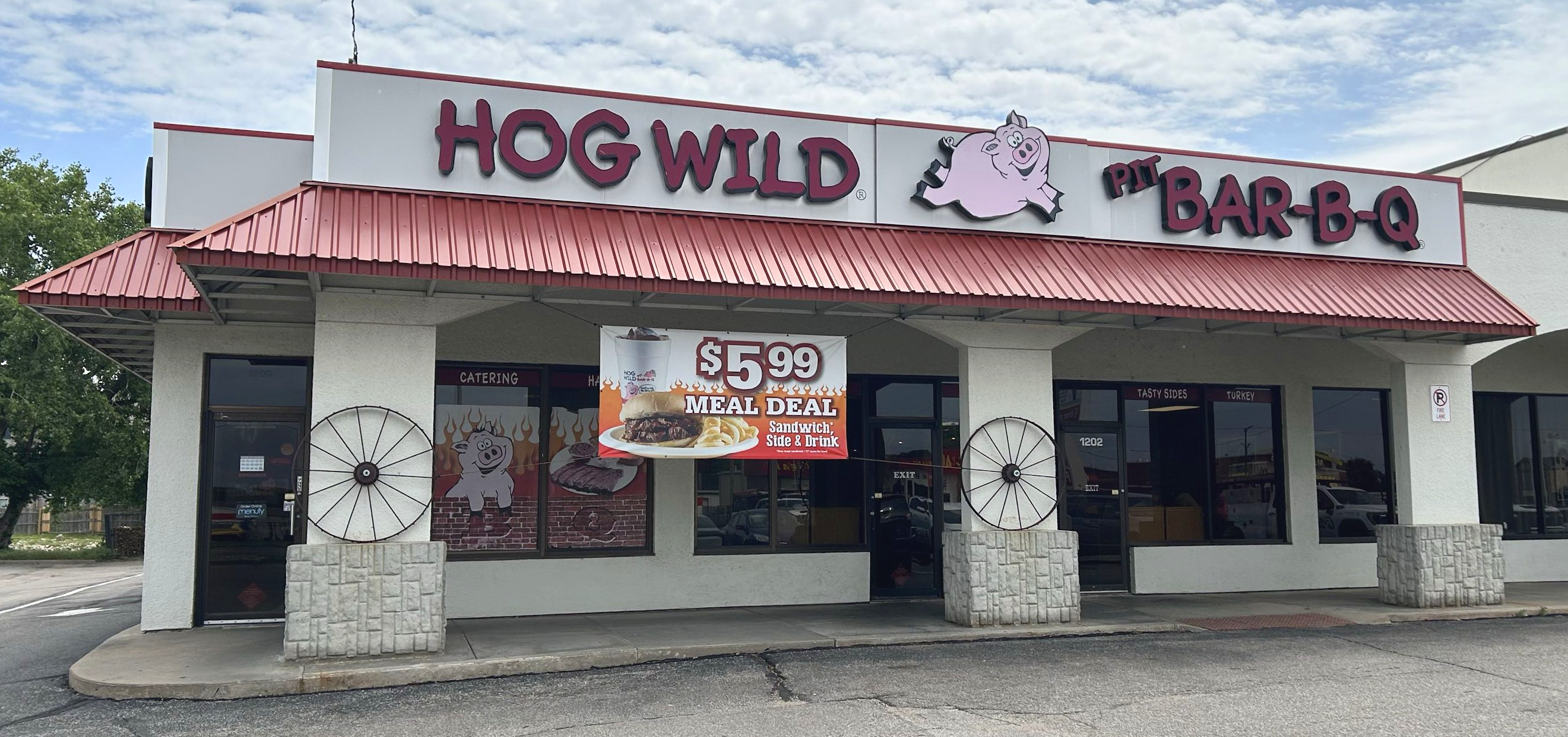
A Hog Wild BBQ restaurant in Wichita, Kansas (2026)

When Kim Arehart expanded to open Kline's in Staunton, Virginia, she also opened Hog Wild BBQ in 1997. This is the only location whose menu offers more than ice cream; it includes Carolina style barbecue, hot dogs, burgers, and other sides. It has made its name in Staunton by selling BBQ by the pound at affordable prices.

Hog Wild can cater for up to 200 people.

== See also ==
- Ice cream parlor
