= Bombe glacée =

Frozen dessert

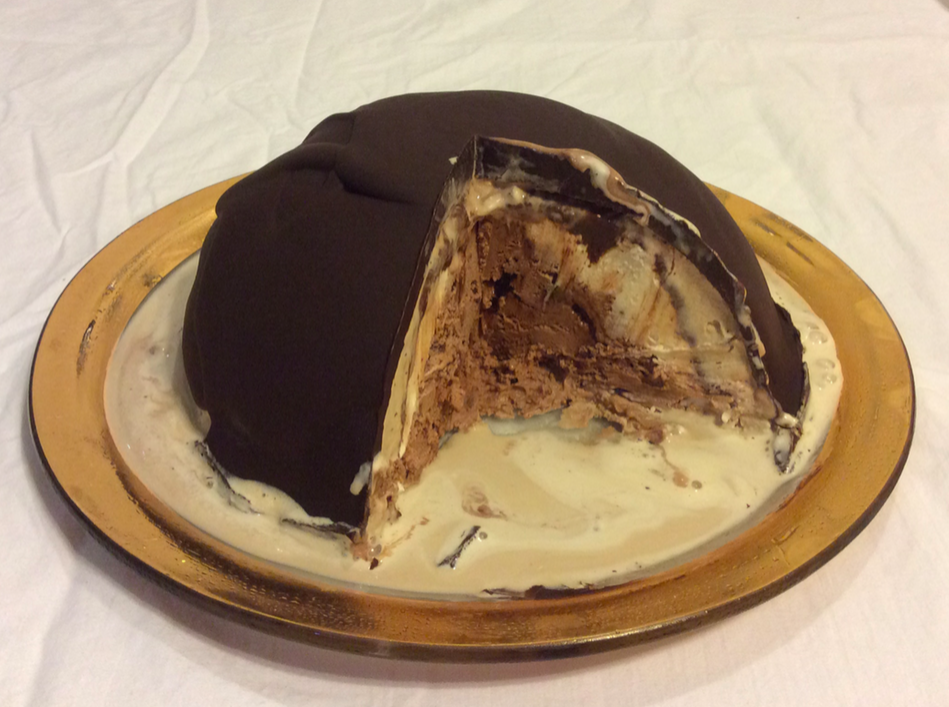
- Alternative names: Bombe
- Course: Dessert
- Place of origin: France
- Main ingredients: Ice cream

A bombe glacée, or simply a bombe, is a French ice cream dessert frozen in a spherical mould so as to resemble a cannonball, hence the name ice cream bomb. Escoffier gives over sixty recipes for bombes in Le Guide culinaire. The dessert appeared on restaurant menus as early as 1882.

By extension, the term has been used to refer to any ice cream confection shaped through molding, not necessarily hemispherical. It has also been used to include dishes made with other frozen desserts, such as sherbet, sorbet, or mousse.

== Background ==
This dessert originated in France during the 18th century. Among Agnes Blackwell Herrick's papers was a copy of the Paris Embassy's Dinner Party Record from 1921 to 1922. There were 16 different bombes in the collection of recipes, many with geographic names like Alhambra, Muscovite and Cleopatre.

It was part of the menu for the wedding of Queen Elizabeth II and Prince Philip. It was served at a White House state dinner hosted by Jacqueline Kennedy Onassis and President Kennedy for the Sudanese president Ibrahim Abboud, and by Queen Elizabeth for Laura and President Bush.

== Preparation ==
The bombe mold is lined with ice cream and filled with a mixture that called pâte à bombe so the ice cream forms the outer shell of the dessert. The filling can be flavored with a fruit-based coulis like raspberry.

== Types ==
- Baked Alaska is a bombe which is baked, frozen and flambéed.
- The Italian dessert spumoni is shaped as a bombe with a semifreddo or parfait filling and custard ice cream forming the outside layer.
- The watermelon bombe is three layered with green-tinted ice cream on the outside, with a thin layer of white ice cream and a red inside layer with chocolate chips.
- Nesselrode pudding is a thick custard cream that is molded and served as a bombe with maraschino custard sauce. The custard is made with sweetened chestnut puree, dried fruits, cherry liquor and whipped cream.
- In Victorian cuisine Creme à la Moscovite was a partially frozen ice set with isinglass (or gelatin), similar to bavarois.

== See also ==
- Ice cream cake
