= Carpigiani Gelato University =

Professional gelato school in Anzola dell'Emilia, Italy

- Entrance of Carpigiani Gelato University in Anzola dell'Emilia, Italy
- Emilia-Romagna; Anzola dell'Emilia; Italy

Information
- Type: Professional culinary school
- Established: 2003
- Website: www.gelatouniversity.com/en/

Carpigiani Gelato University is a professional training school for gelato making based in Anzola dell'Emilia, in the Metropolitan City of Bologna, Italy. It was established by gelato-equipment manufacturer Carpigiani in 2003 to provide professional education in Italian-style artisan gelato production.

The school offers theoretical and practical courses covering gelato formulation, production techniques, food science and business management. According to Carpigiani, it organizes more than 400 courses annually in 13 languages and receives more than 6,000 students each year through its main campus and a network of more than 30 international locations.

== History ==
Carpigiani Gelato University was established in 2003 at Carpigiani's headquarters in Anzola dell'Emilia. The school was created to provide professional training in artisan gelato production and to support the international development of gelato-making skills and businesses.

By 2010, the Los Angeles Times reported that its courses had attracted students from more than 100 countries.

The school subsequently expanded through an international network of training locations and partnerships with culinary schools and professional institutions. In 2023, Carpigiani reported that more than 70,000 students had attended its courses since the school's establishment.

== Teaching and courses ==
Students during a practical gelato-making class at Carpigiani Gelato University.

The curriculum combines classroom instruction and practical laboratory work. Courses cover subjects including ingredient selection, recipe balancing, freezing processes, production techniques, hygiene, storage and business management.

Courses are offered at different levels, including basic, intermediate, advanced and master programmes, as well as specialised courses and individual training.

The main teaching centre is located at Carpigiani's headquarters in Anzola dell'Emilia. The school also provides online training and operates through an international network of affiliated campuses and training centres.

== International network ==
Carpigiani Gelato University has progressively developed an international network of training centres. According to the school, it currently has more than 30 locations worldwide and provides courses in 13 languages.

Its international expansion has included partnerships with culinary schools and professional training institutions, allowing courses based on the school's curriculum to be offered outside Italy.

== Specialty schools ==
In 2015, Carpigiani established Carpigiani Gelato Pastry University, a specialised programme combining gelato and pastry training.

A further specialty school for foodservice professionals was introduced in 2017, focusing on the use of gelato and frozen desserts in professional restaurant and culinary applications.

== See also ==
- Carpigiani
- Gelato
- Gelato Museum Carpigiani
