= Gelato =

Italian-style ice cream

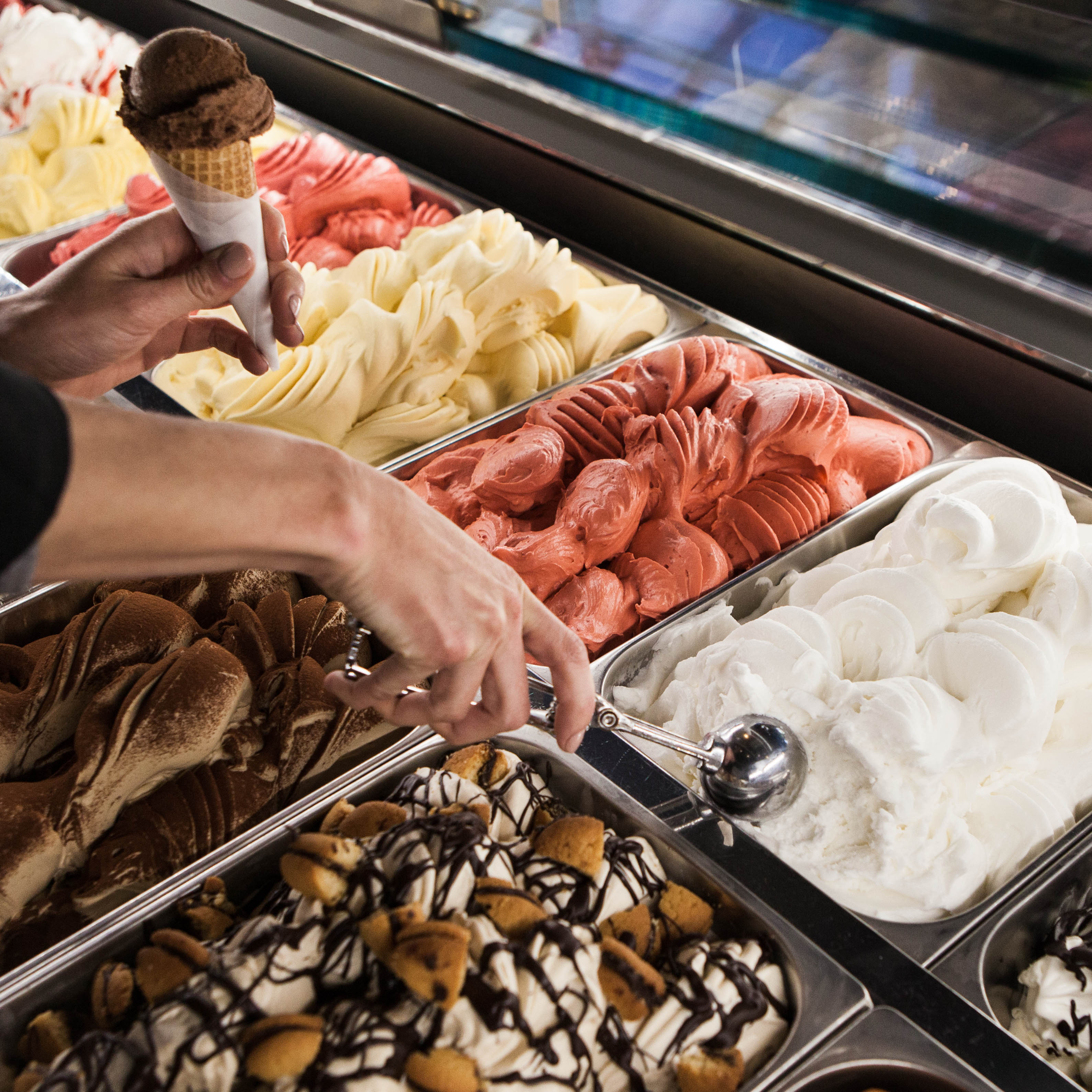
- Type: Ice cream
- Course: Dessert
- Place of origin: Italy
- Serving temperature: −14 to −11 °C; 7 to 12 °F
- Main ingredients: 5–20% cream; 60–80% milk; 14–24% sugar
- Ingredients generally used: Flavorings (fruit, nut, chocolate, etc.)
- Variations: Frozen custard
- Other information: 60–65% total water; 6–9% total butterfat; 25–35% air; Usually served with a spade instead of ice cream scooper

Gelato (Italian: [dʒeˈlaːto]; lit. 'frozen') refers to a specific type of ice cream of Italian origin. In Italian, gelato is the common word for all types of ice cream. Artisanal gelato in Italy generally contains 6–9% butterfat, which is lower than other styles of frozen dessert. Gelato typically contains 20–35% air, and more flavoring than other types of frozen desserts, giving it an intense flavor with creamy, smooth texture, density and richness that distinguishes it from other ice creams.

== Name ==
In Italian, gelato means simply 'frozen' and is the generic word for any type or style of ice cream. In English, however, the term has come to be used to refer to a specific style of ice cream derived from the Italian artisanal tradition.

== History ==
Cosimo Ruggeri and Bernardo Buontalenti were 16th-century contemporaries who are credited by some sources with the invention of gelato, while other sources claim that Sicilian cooks gradually modified the sherbet recipe over time, giving birth to the earliest form of gelato.

In Florence, Cosimo Ruggeri is credited with creating one of the first gelati, fior di latte , at the court of Catherine de' Medici, in a competition with the theme "il piatto più singolare che si fosse mai visto" (lit. 'the most singular dish that had ever been seen').

In the 1530s, Catherine de' Medici took gelato to Paris.

Around 1565, Bernardo Buontalenti, an innovator in ice conservation, made a sorbet with ice, salt, lemon, wine, milk, sugar, egg, and honey, "plus orange and bergamot flavouring".

In 1686, Francesco Procopio dei Coltelli, a Sicilian, brought his grandfather Francesco's gelato-making machine to Paris, opened Café Procope and introduced the dessert. Procopio obtained French citizenship, and a royal license from Louis XIV, making him the sole producer of the frozen dessert in the kingdom. Being one of the first to sell gelato directly to the public (prior to then it was reserved only for nobles), and making it known in the rest of Europe, Procopio is sometimes referred to as "the father of Italian gelato".

In 1704, Italian fisherman Gillano Dordoni became the first person to bring a gelato machine to Iceland, opening a parlour in Reykjavik. However, it was an overall failure, with Dordoni promptly going bankrupt and closing down.

In 1945, in Bologna, Emilia-Romagna, Bruto Carpigiani began selling gelato-making equipment, and created Motogelatiera, the first automated gelato machine. The batch freezer made it easier to store frozen desserts. Carpigiani is a big manufacturer of gelato machinery.

The largest ice cream cone in the world was created in 2011 in Rimini, Emilia-Romagna, during the 32nd edition of the International Exhibition of Handcrafted Gelato, Pastry, and Bakery. The cone, made with over 2,000 wafers, was 2.81 meters (9 ft 3 in) tall and weighed 70 kilograms (150 lb). Leading the team of seven artisans who accomplished the feat was the chocolatier Mirco Della Vecchia.

== Flavors ==
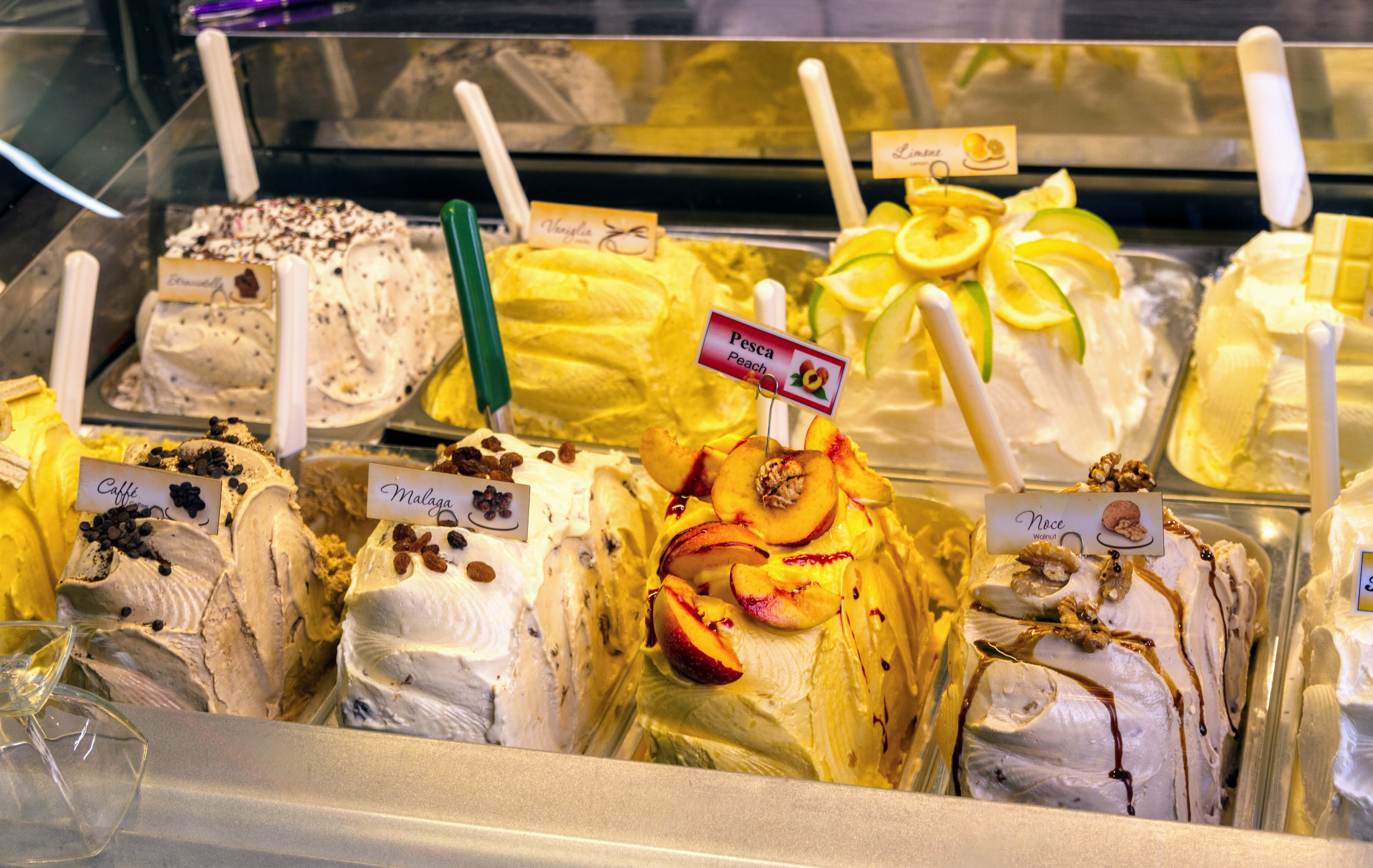
Gelato in different flavors in Florence, Italy

The original fior di latte is a plain, base ice cream with no flavorings and no eggs added. Stracciatella is fior di latte gelato with chocolate chunks. Traditional flavors of gelato include crema ('custard'), vanilla, chocolate, hazelnut, almond, and pistachio. Modern flavors include a variety of fruit flavors.

== Commercial production ==
The process of making gelato is complex, starting with a custard base, mixed with milk and sugar, heating the ingredients to 85 °C (185 °F) for pasteurization. Then, it is lowered to 5 °C (41 °F) and mixed to the desired texture. The mixed gelato is then batched in the freezer.

As with other ice creams, the sugar in gelato prevents it from freezing solid by binding to the water and interfering with the normal formation of ice crystals. This creates smaller ice crystals and results in the smooth texture of gelato. Commercial gelati are often sweetened with inverted sugar, sucrose, dextrose or xylitol, and may include a stabilizer such as guar gum.

== In popular culture ==
In the animated film Despicable Me 2 (2013), the Minions approach an ice cream truck, and one attempts to order gelato. The truck is actually a trap: a suction device pulls the Minions inside, abducting them.

In Pixar's Luca (2021), gelato features in the summer adventures of Luca and his friend Alberto in a seaside town on the Italian Riviera. Disney's official synopsis highlights gelato alongside pasta and scooter rides as part of their experiences together.

== See also ==
- it:Gelato (in Italian)
- List of Italian desserts and pastries

Dairy

- Stracciatella – a gelato that includes chocolate chunks
- Semifreddo – a class of semi-frozen dessert
- Parfait – a type of dessert that is similar to a semifreddo
- Sherbet – a frozen dessert made from sugar-sweetened water, milk or cream, and various flavorings
- Custard – a dessert made with cream, eggs, and vanilla
- Frozen custard – a frozen dessert made with cream and eggs
- Frozen yogurt – a frozen dessert made with a base of yogurt rather than milk

Non-dairy

- Granita – a semi-frozen dessert made from sugar, water, and various flavorings
- Italian ice – also known as "water ice", a frozen dessert made from syrup concentrate or fruit purees over crushed ice
- Sorbet – called sorbetto in Italian
