= Haato =

Company based in Singapore

Haato & co. (formerly Gelato di Crema) is a retailer of dessert based in Singapore, operating a chain of cafes, and run by the Dessert Empire Private Limited. A Haato cafe is run either by a franchisee or the corporation itself. Haato primarily sells gelato, yoghurt, sorbet, waffles, pastries, beverages and hot food. As of 2011, there are seven Haato outlets across Singapore. It was ranked second on the list of five best gelato shops in Singapore.
