= Italian ice =

Frozen dessert

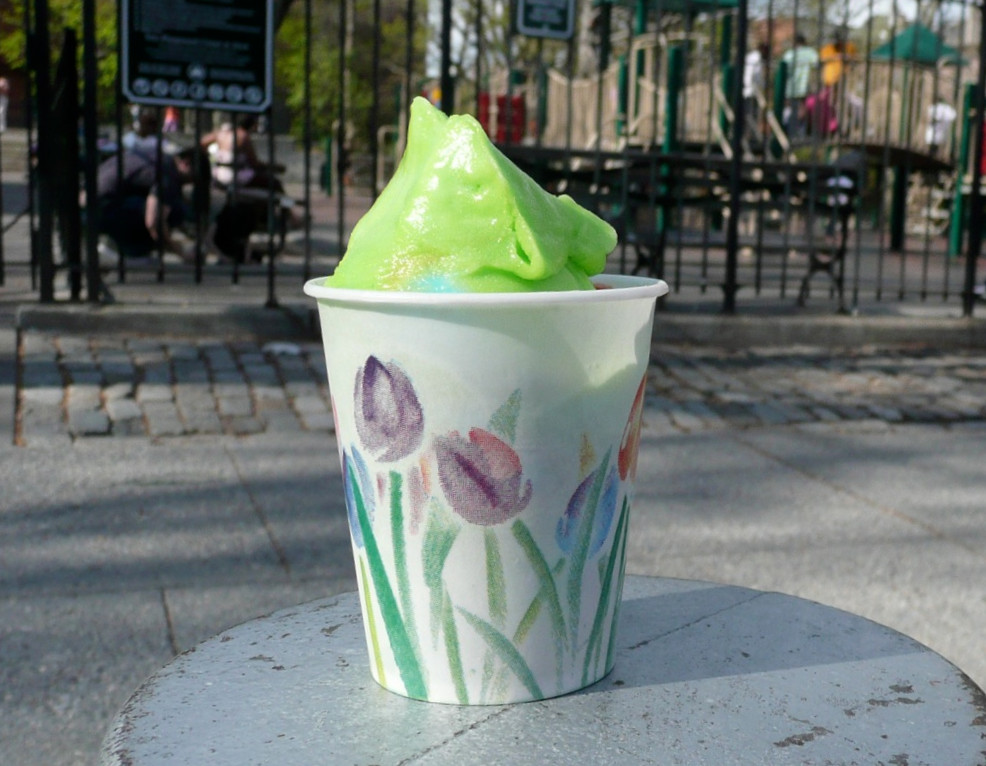
- Lime-flavored Italian ice
- Course: Dessert
- Place of origin: United States
- Main ingredients: Water, fruit (concentrate, juice, or purée)

Italian ice is a semi-frozen sweetened treat composed of finely granulated ice and fruit concentrates, juices, or purées, or other natural or artificial food flavorings. Italian ice is derived from Italian granita and is in many ways similar to sorbet and snow cones, but differs from American-style sherbet in that it does not contain dairy or egg ingredients. The ingredients in Italian ice are mixed, then whipped during the freezing process similar to the process for making ice cream. As a group, Italian ice comes in a variety of consistencies from crunchy, to smooth, to slushy. In Philadelphia and its metropolitan area Italian ice is known as water ice. In Boston and other places in New England, it is known as slush — not to be confused with a slushie, which is a drink.

Italian ice was introduced to the United States by Italian immigrants and is derived from the Sicilian granita, a similar and related Italian dessert, with Italian immigrants often selling it in the streets of cities such as New York City and Philadelphia. Traditionally lemon-flavored, popular modern choices include cherry, strawberry, and other fruits and confections.

== History ==
The Italian word sorbetto and English sherbet come from fruit syrups sweetened with honey or palm sugar and diluted with water that were once drunk by Arabs.

In Italy, Italian ice or granita seems to have appeared at the same time as ice cream in the second half of the 17th century. Both products use the same technology. Italian ice can be used as a stand-alone refreshment, dessert, or as a palate restorer in a multi-course meal.

== Water ice ==
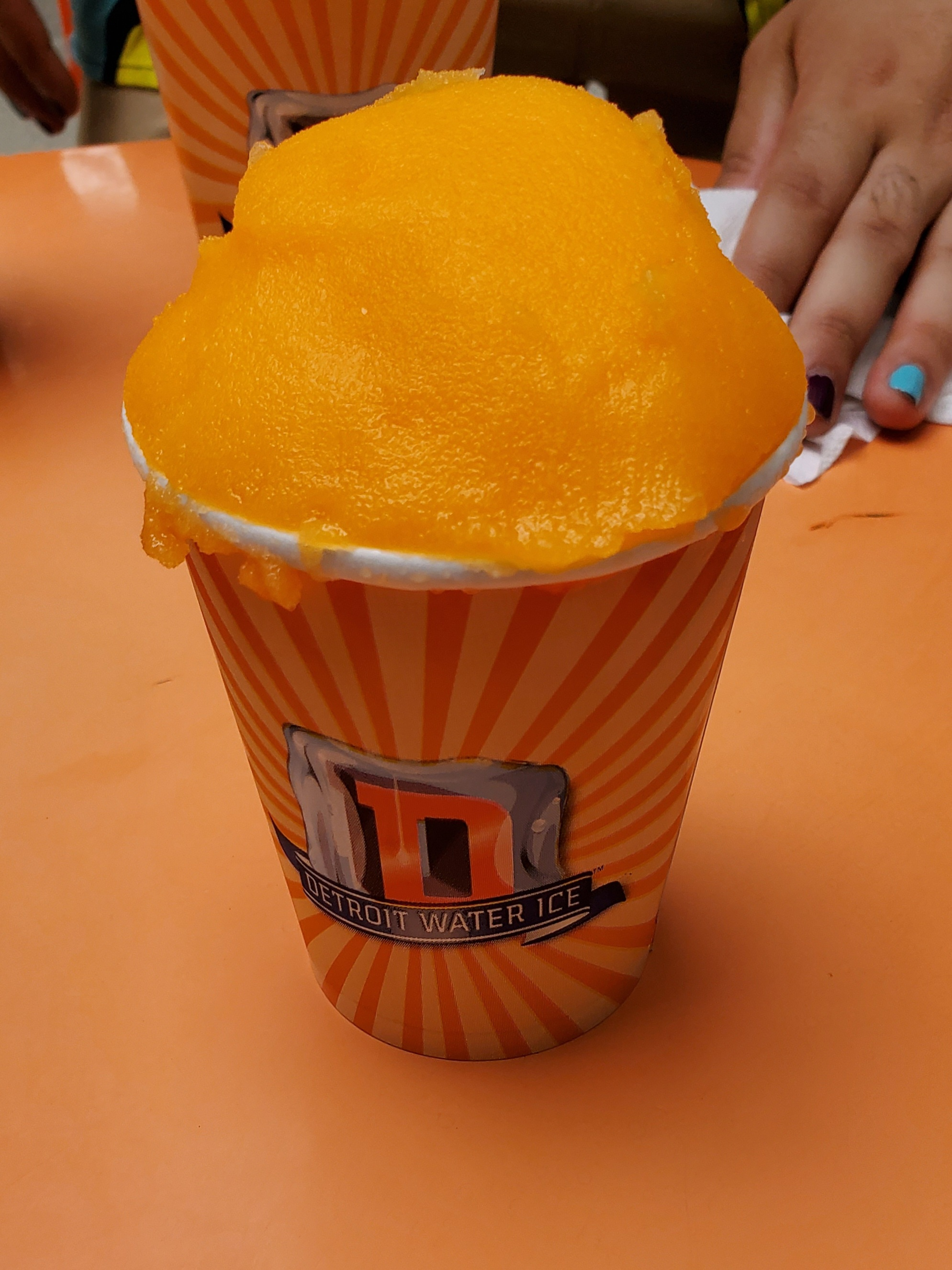
An orange Italian ice (sold as water ice)

Finely granulated flavored ice of Italian immigrant origin is instead commonly referred to and sold as water ice by residents and natives of Philadelphia and the Philadelphia metropolitan area, including South Jersey.

Although largely synonymous with Italian ice, water ice has also been described as a specific type of Italian ice originating in Philadelphia, or a "variation on the more broadly-accepted Italian ice".

Water ice is generally sold in the Philadelphia metropolitan area in the late spring and summer months, being one of the most popular frozen desserts sold in the city by virtue of commercial chains such as Rita's Italian Ice.

== See also ==
- Granita, a Sicilian preparation made of partially frozen water, flavorings, and sometimes sugar
- Shaved ice, a class of related but distinct desserts
- Slushy, a frozen drink made from flavored ice, similar to granitas
