= Aboukir (cake) =

French layered dessert

Aboukir is a dessert made with a sponge cake that has been baked in a Charlotte mold, divided into multiple sheets which are layered with chestnut cream. According to Larousse Gastronomique the dessert is of French origins. The assembled dessert is iced with coffee-flavoured fondant and decorated with a garnish of chopped pistachios. A frozen variation with pistachio ice cream is called an Aboukir bombe.

Aboukir almonds are a type of petit four made with marzipan colored pink or green, with an almond in the center and glazed with boiled sugar or caramel. Aboukir is a region in Egypt where almond production formerly took place. The almonds were exported to Europe from the Aboukir port.

== See also ==
- Princess cake
