= Mellorine =

Lower-cost imitation of ice cream

- Type: Frozen dessert

Mellorine is a lower-cost imitation of ice cream, made using fats other than butterfat. It can be made from both animal fat and vegetable fat.

Mellorine is produced in the same way as ice cream except for the substitution of highly refined fats (vegetable oil) for butterfat. It is made by freezing while stirring a pasteurized mix of milk-derived nonfat solids and animal or vegetable fat (or both). Afterward, it is battered by a carbohydrate sweetener and the addition of flavoring ingredients.

Mellorine was a product of necessity after World War II. In the United States, manufactured wartime goods made of cotton, cotton meal, and cottonseed oil were no longer being used in quantity by the military. Cottonseed oil found peacetime use in salad dressings, mayonnaise, and in the ice-cream substitute mellorine. In 1973, the U.S. Food and Drug Administration created a standard of identity for mellorine as part of its efforts to encourage new product innovation and nutrition information labeling.
