= Carpigiani =

Manufacturer of gelato and ice cream machines

Logo

Carpigiani is an Italian manufacturer of professional equipment for the production of gelato, ice cream and other frozen desserts. Founded in Bologna in 1946 and headquartered in Anzola dell'Emilia, in the Metropolitan City of Bologna, the company manufactures equipment including batch freezers, pasteurizers and machines for soft serve, shakes, frozen beverages and other foodservice applications.

Carpigiani has been part of Ali Group since 1989. Ali Group completed its acquisition of Welbilt in 2022.

== History ==
The origins of Carpigiani are associated with brothers Bruto and Poerio Carpigiani. During the 1940s, Bruto Carpigiani worked on the development of an automatic machine for gelato production based on continuous mixing and scraping of the freezing cylinder walls. A related patent was filed in Bologna in 1946, with Poerio Carpigiani listed as the inventor and Carpigiani as the patent holder.

Bruto Carpigiani died in 1945. On 5 April 1946, Poerio Carpigiani renamed the existing business Carpigiani Bruto and production of the Autogelatiera began.

During the post-war decades, the company expanded both in Italy and internationally. Carpigiani France was established in 1954, while Coldelite USA was founded in 1964 as part of the company's expansion into the United States.

In 1969, the company moved its operations to a larger industrial site in Anzola dell'Emilia, near Bologna. In 1971, Carpigiani acquired fellow Italian gelato-equipment manufacturer Cattabriga.

In 1989, Carpigiani became part of Ali Group, an Italian manufacturer of commercial foodservice equipment.

== Training and cultural activities ==
=== Carpigiani Gelato University ===
In 2003, the company established Carpigiani Gelato University at its headquarters in Anzola dell'Emilia. The school provides professional training in artisan gelato production and related subjects.

According to Carpigiani, the university currently organizes more than 400 courses per year in 13 languages and welcomes more than 6,000 students annually. It operates through a network of more than 30 international campuses.

=== Gelato Museum ===
In September 2012, Carpigiani opened the Gelato Museum Carpigiani at its headquarters in Anzola dell'Emilia. The museum documents the history of gelato, the development of production technology and changes in the ways gelato has been produced and consumed.

The museum occupies approximately 1,000 square metres and contains historical gelato-making machines, tools, multimedia installations and an archive of approximately 10,000 photographs and documents.

== Corporate structure and activities ==
Carpigiani is headquartered in Anzola dell'Emilia, near Bologna. Its equipment is used in artisan gelato production and in other foodservice applications including soft serve, frozen yogurt, shakes, frozen beverages, pastry and whipped cream.

Since 1989 the company has been part of Ali Group. In July 2022, Ali Group completed the acquisition of Welbilt, expanding the group's international foodservice-equipment portfolio.

== See also ==
- Gelato
- Ice cream
- List of Italian companies
