= Frozen dessert =

Dessert made by freezing

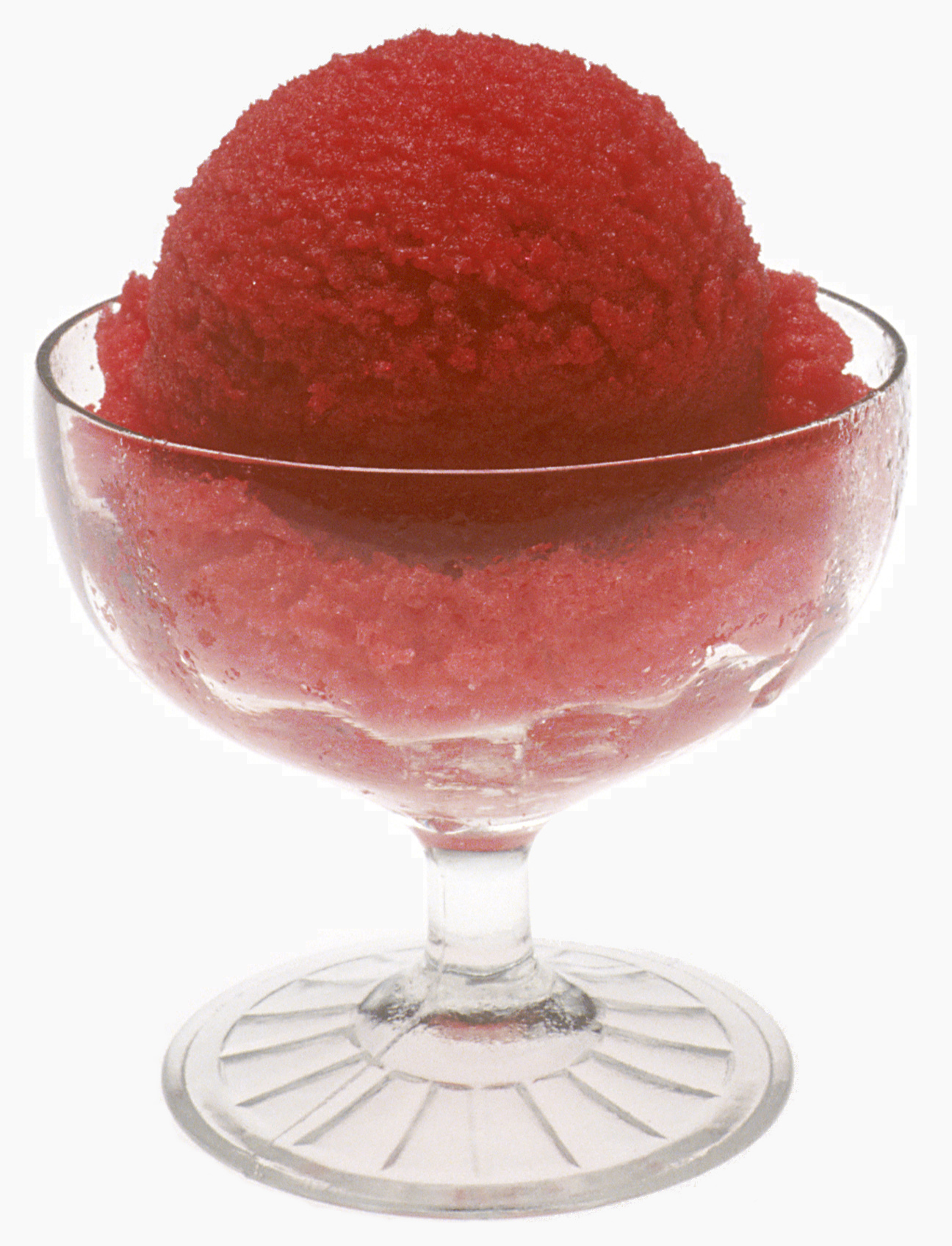
- Raspberry sorbet
- Course: Dessert

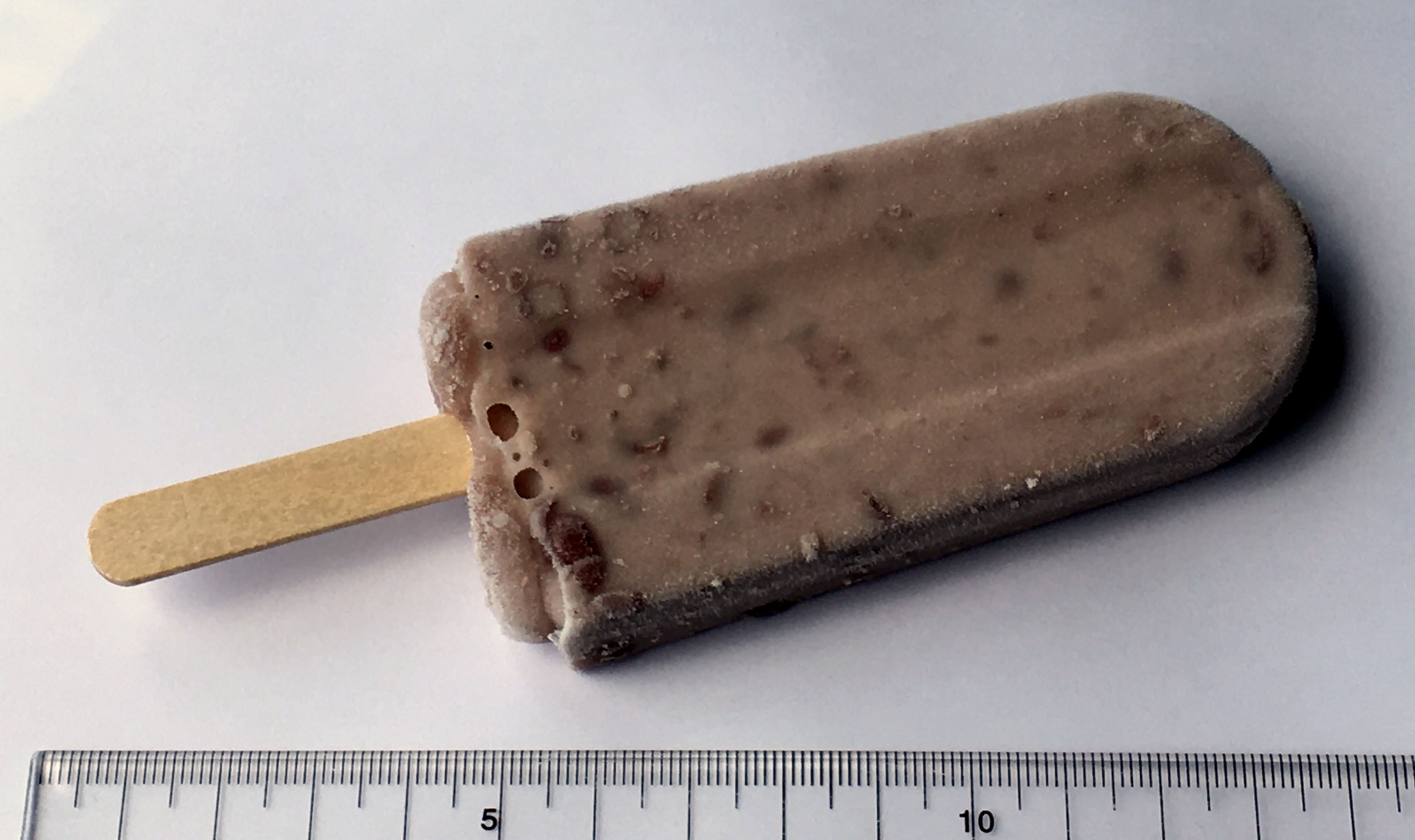
Azuki Bar, a Japanese frozen dessert

Frozen dessert is a dessert made by freezing liquids, semi-solids, and sometimes solids. They may be based on flavored water (shave ice, ice pops, sorbet, snow cones), fruit purées (such as sorbet), milk and cream (most ice creams, sundae, sherbet), custard (frozen custard and some ice creams), mousse (semifreddo), and others.

== History ==
The origins of frozen desserts are obscure, although several accounts exist about their history. Some sources describe ice cream-like foods as originating in Persia as far back as 550 BC. Using ice houses and ice pools, Persians were able to serve and produce faloodeh and sorbets all year round.

Ice and snow were prized ingredients in many ancient cuisines. The Chinese, the Greeks and the Romans gathered, stored and used ice or snow. Ice and snow were said to be desirable because of the difficulty of both harvesting and storing it for any length of time. Around 500 BC, snow was used to cool drinks in Greece. In the 2nd century, Iranians recorded recipes for sweetened chilled drinks with ice made by freezing water in the desert at night. Hippocrates (c. 460 – c. 370 BC) is known to have criticized chilled drinks for causing "fluxes of the stomach". Snow collected from the lower slopes of mountains was unsanitary and iced drinks were believed to cause convulsions, colic and a host of other ailments. Seneca criticized the extravagant costs associated with iced desserts in an era without refrigeration.

Recipes for snow-chilled sweets are included in a 1st-century Roman recipe book. c. 50 AD, Roman Emperor Nero demanded that slaves collect ice from the Apennine Mountains to produce the first sorbet mixed with honey and wine.

Other accounts say ice cream originated in the Mongol Empire and first spread to China during its expansion. Tang dynasty (618–907 AD) records describe a chilled dessert made with flour, camphor and water buffalo milk. In the 13th century, Mongolian horsemen traversing the Gobi Desert reportedly "took cream in containers made from animal intestines." The sub-zero temperatures and continuous shaking typical of horseback riding would create the ice cream. Though this legend has been published, there is no written evidence to this claim.

In 1296, Marco Polo reportedly heard of the Chinese invention and is credited with introducing sorbet-style desserts to Italy; but it is not mentioned in his writings.

Another origin myth says that in 1533, while 14 years old, Catherine de' Medici introduced flavored sorbet ices to France when she brought Italian chefs there upon marrying the Duke of Orléans (Henry II of France) that year. Another myth suggests that Charles I of England was so impressed by the "frozen snow" that he offered his own ice cream maker a lifetime pension in return for keeping the formula secret, so that ice cream could be a royal prerogative. There is no evidence to support either of these legends and food historian W. S. Stallings, Jr. says "this tale is... undocumented, and is first seen in print in the 19th century. The documentation of ice cream in England begins following the return of Charles II from his exile in France".

== Variations ==
In Canada and elsewhere, the term is often used on imitations of ice cream which do not satisfy its legal definition (e.g., mellorine).

In India some company brands like Hindustan Unilever sell frozen dessert made from vegetable oils rather than pure milk. Per Indian regulations, ice cream which is made from milk solids, but contains non-dairy fat is categorized and labelled as frozen dessert.

In Singapore, hawker centres sell ice kacang made with shaved ice packed into a mountain-like shape drizzled with gula melaka, coconut cream, or a variety of syrups. Topped with red beans, creamed corn, attap chee, cendol, and grass jelly. The dish has evolved to include fruits such as durian, mango, and toppings such as Milo.

== See also ==
- List of frozen dessert brands
