= Semifreddo =

Italian frozen dessert

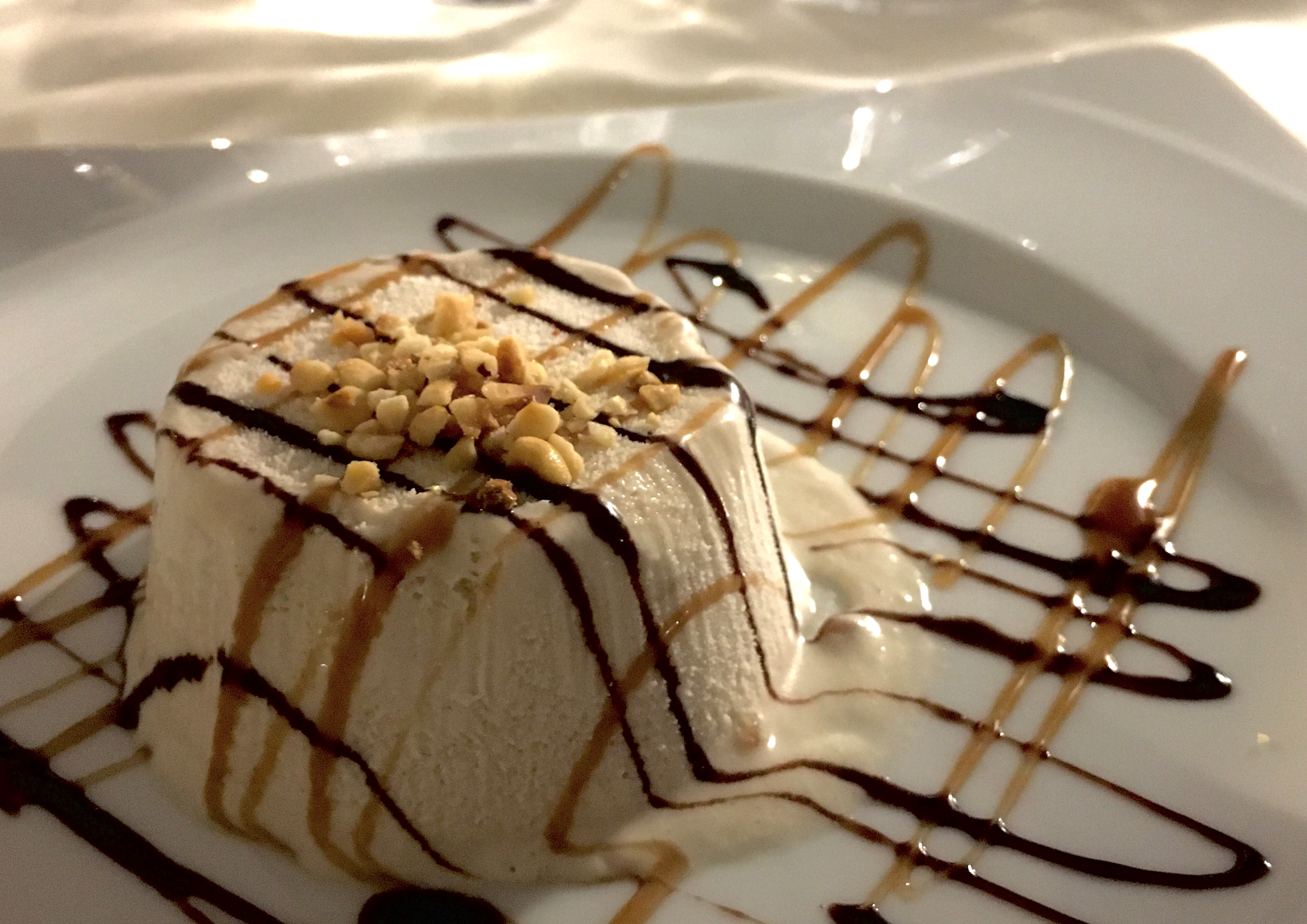
- Course: Dessert
- Place of origin: Italy
- Main ingredients: Egg whites, sugar, cream

Semifreddo (Italian: [ˌsemiˈfreddo]; lit. 'half-cold') is a class of frozen desserts prepared mainly with egg whites, sugar, and cream. It has a light, airy texture likened to mousse or light cake that is created by whipping air into the mixture before freezing. Some recipes place cake, nougat, sliced fruit, caramelised fruit, jelly or pudding at the core and base of the semifreddo.

It differs from ice cream in that the semifreddo is frozen in molds (not churned), is lighter in texture, uses egg whites rather than yolks, and uses more cream and sugar to create a fluffier consistency.

== Etymology ==
The origin of the word semifreddo is not clearly defined, although it is supposed to indicate that it is only partially frozen. It is supposed that semifreddo was based on gelato, and became popular around the 20th century as a simpler alternative to ice cream and gelato. The earliest recorded mention of the semifreddo is in Antonio Nebbia's Il cuoco maceratese (1779), in which he describes the semifreddo fior di latte as a "mixture of milk, sugar, and cream that is chilled until it reaches a consistency similar to frozen custard".

== Method of preparation ==
The preparation of a semifreddo incorporates elements from classic desserts such as Italian or French meringue. Traditional semifreddo is made by caramelising sugar to 248°F, whisking it into egg whites, and then folding the mixture into whipped cream. The mixture is then piped into molds and frozen until firm (typically 6–8 hours or preferably overnight). To make eight servings, two cups heavy whipping cream, one cup sugar, and six egg whites are required.

The dessert can be elevated by adding a base (of cake, nuts or fruit) and a core (of nougat, jelly or pudding). The semifreddo can also be flavoured using vanilla extract or beans, lemon curd, chocolate (called semifreddo al cioccolato) or small pieces of fruits and nuts.

Despite being a simple dessert with only three main ingredients, its preparation is considered technical because incorrect techniques can cause the dish to become too dense, split or harder than desired. The mixture must be sufficiently aerated, else it will collapse on itself in the freezer and take on the dense consistency of mousse. However, over-whipping will cause the cream to become grainy after freezing. Flavouring agents must be incorporated into the whipped eggs, not the cream lest is seize and split. Similarly, the mixture and additional elements must be cooled before being folded into the cold cream to prevent it from splitting. Lastly, the semifreddo should be lightly piped into parchment-lined or silicone molds so that it stays fluffy and can be easily removed.

== Similar desserts ==
Semifreddo differs from ice cream in that the semifreddo is frozen in molds (not churned), is lighter in texture, uses egg whites rather than yolks, and uses more cream and sugar to create a fluffier consistency. Parfait differs from semifreddo in that it contains only pâte à bombe and neither Italian meringue nor whipped cream. Biscotto ghiacciato contains, in addition to Italian meringue, semi-whipped cream, and fruit purée.

== See also ==
- List of Italian desserts and pastries
- List of custard desserts
