= Granita =

Sicilian dessert

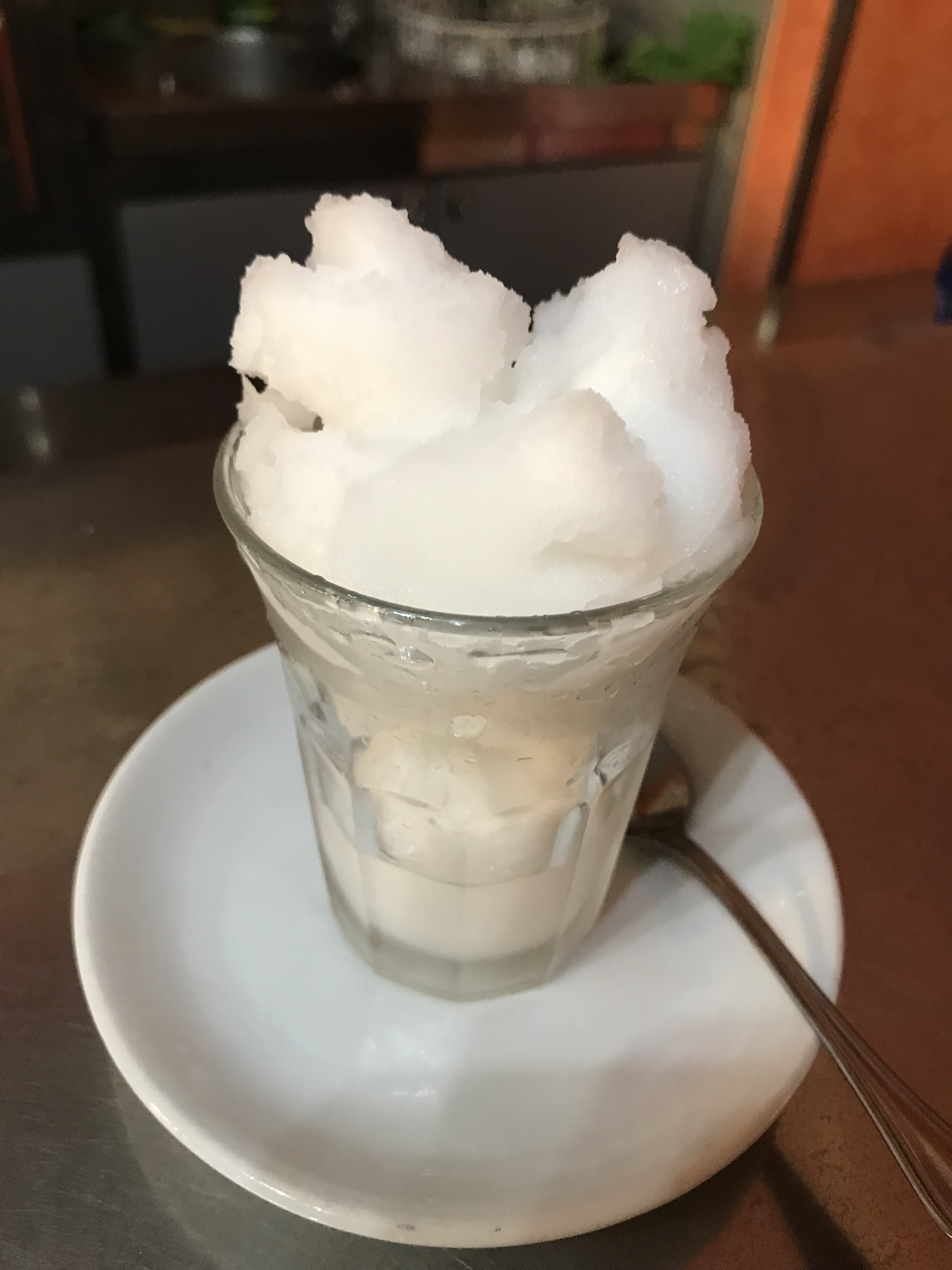
- Granita flavored with Sicilian lemon
- Alternative names: Granita siciliana
- Course: Dessert
- Place of origin: Italy
- Region or state: Sicily
- Main ingredients: Sugar, water, flavoring

Granita (Italian: [ɡraˈniːta]) or granita siciliana (Italian: [ɡraˈniːta sitʃiˈljaːna]) is a type of sorbet made from sugar solutions flavored with lemon, coffee, or fruit juices, and stirred during freezing to produce a soft mixture made up of many tiny ice crystals. Originally from Sicily, it is available throughout Italy in varying forms. Food writer Jeffrey Steingarten says that "the desired texture seems to vary from city to city" on the island; on the west coast and in Palermo, it is at its chunkiest, and in the east, it is nearly as smooth as sorbet.

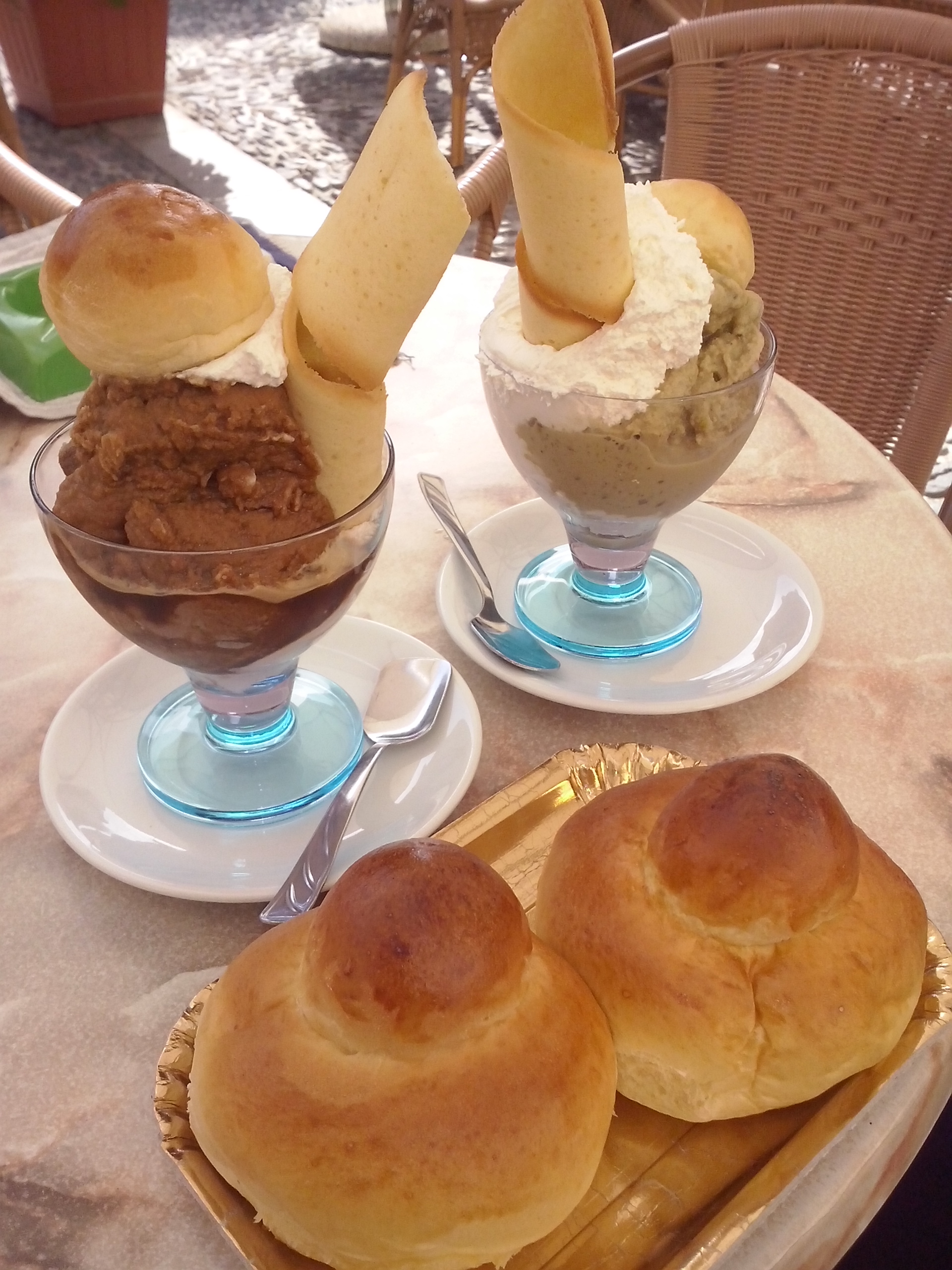
Coffee and pistachio granita served with brioche.

Messina is particularly associated with the creamy style of granita, served with a brioscia col tuppo (brioche) and traditionally eaten for breakfast. A typical preparation known as mezza con panna consists of coffee granita topped with whipped cream.

== Ingredients ==
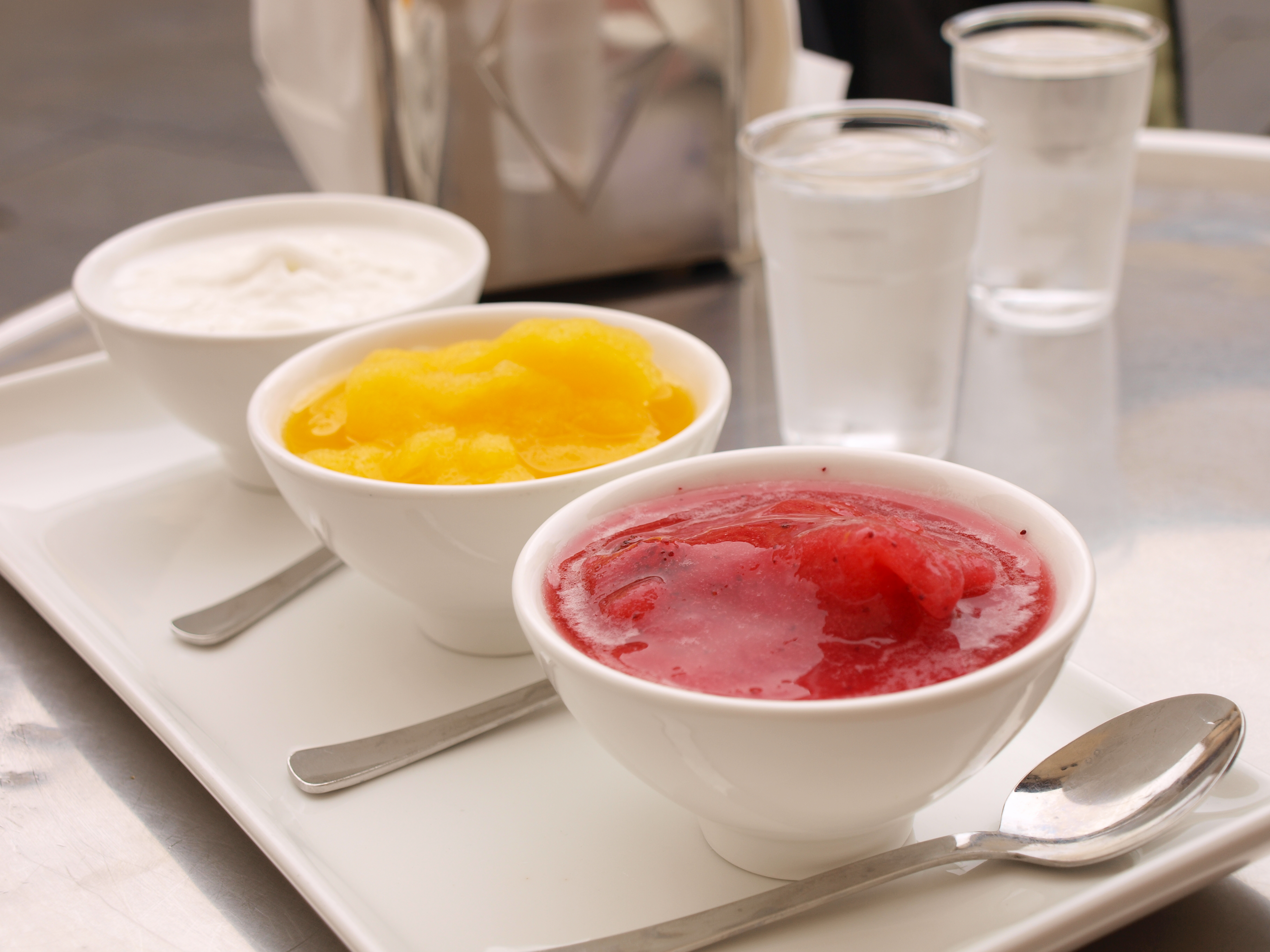
Tris di granite (lit. 'trio of granitas') with strawberry, mandarin, and almond flavors

Common and traditional flavoring ingredients include lemon juice, mandarin oranges, jasmine, coffee, almonds, mint, and when in season wild strawberries and black mulberries.

== See also ==
- List of Italian desserts and pastries
- Gelato
