= Anzola dell'Emilia =

- Comune
- Comune di Anzola dell'Emilia
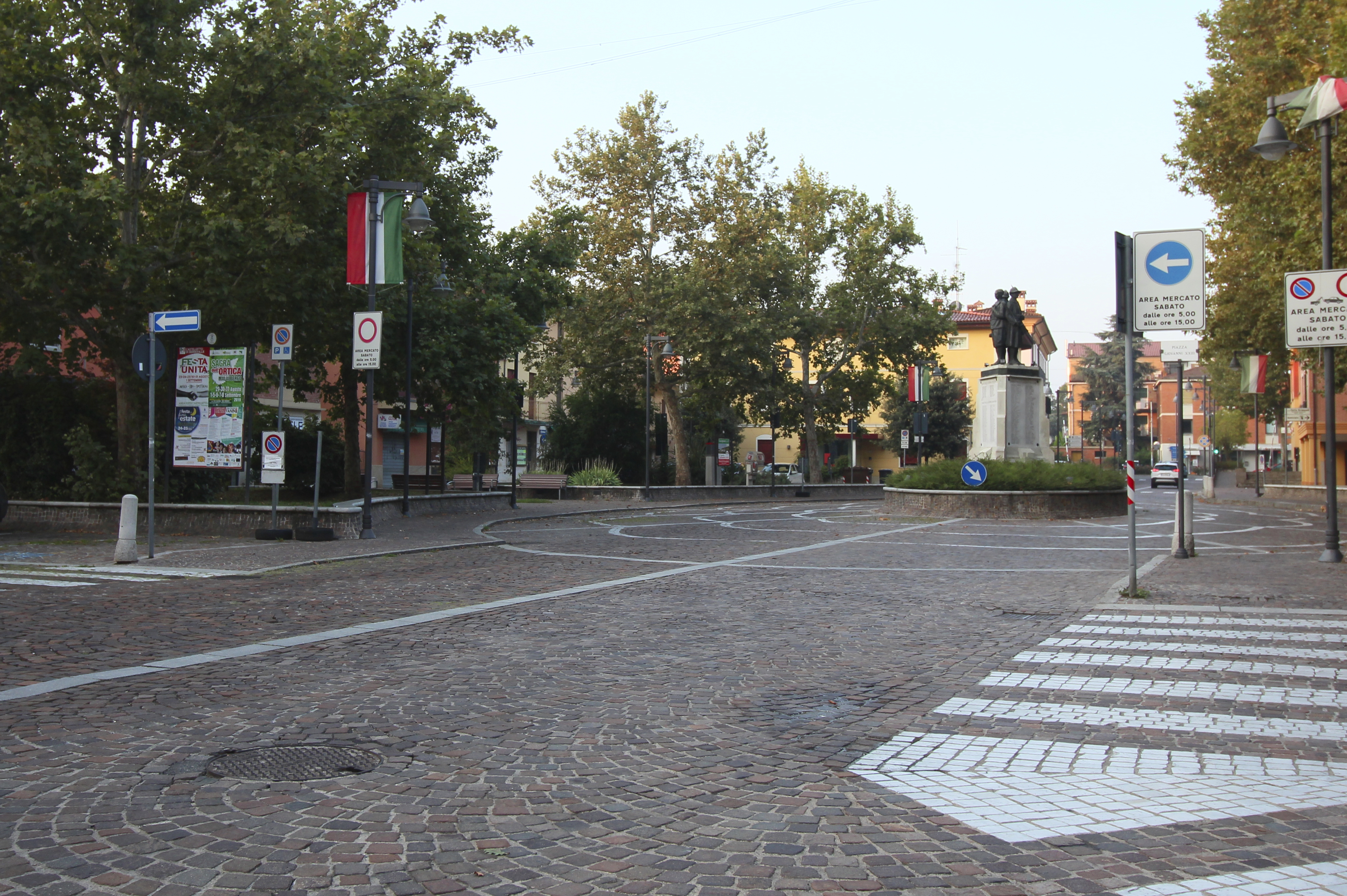

- Coat of arms

- Location of Anzola dell'Emilia in Italy Anzola dell'Emilia (Emilia-Romagna)
- Coordinates: 44°32′50″N 11°11′44″E
- Country: Italy
- Region: Emilia-Romagna
- Metropolitan city: Bologna (BO)
- Frazioni: Castelletto, Lavino di Mezzo, Ponte Samoggia, San Giacomo Del Martignone, Santa Maria in Strada

Government
  - Mayor: Giampiero Veronesi

Area
  - Total: 36.6 km^{2} (14.1 sq mi)
- Elevation: 38 m (125 ft)

Population (30 April 2017)
  - Total: 12,260
  - Density: 335/km^{2} (868/sq mi)
- Demonym: Anzolesi
- Time zone: UTC+1 (CET)
  - Summer (DST): UTC+2 (CEST)
- Postal code: 40011
- Dialing code: 051
- Patron saint: Sts. Peter and Paul
- Saint day: June 29
- Website: Official website

Anzola dell'Emilia (Western Bolognese: Anzôla) is a comune (municipality) in the Metropolitan City of Bologna in the Italian region Emilia-Romagna, located about 13 kilometres (8 mi) northwest of Bologna. It is an important area of industries and Habanero's crops near Bologna.

== Twin towns ==
Anzola dell'Emilia is twinned with:

- Polistena, Italy
