= Pâte à bombe =

Egg-based pastry base

Pâte à bombe is a base used in desserts such as mousse and parfait. It consists of a whipping of egg yolks to which a syrup of water and sugar cooked at 120 °C (248 °F) is added.
