= Sherbet (frozen dessert) =

Frozen dessert

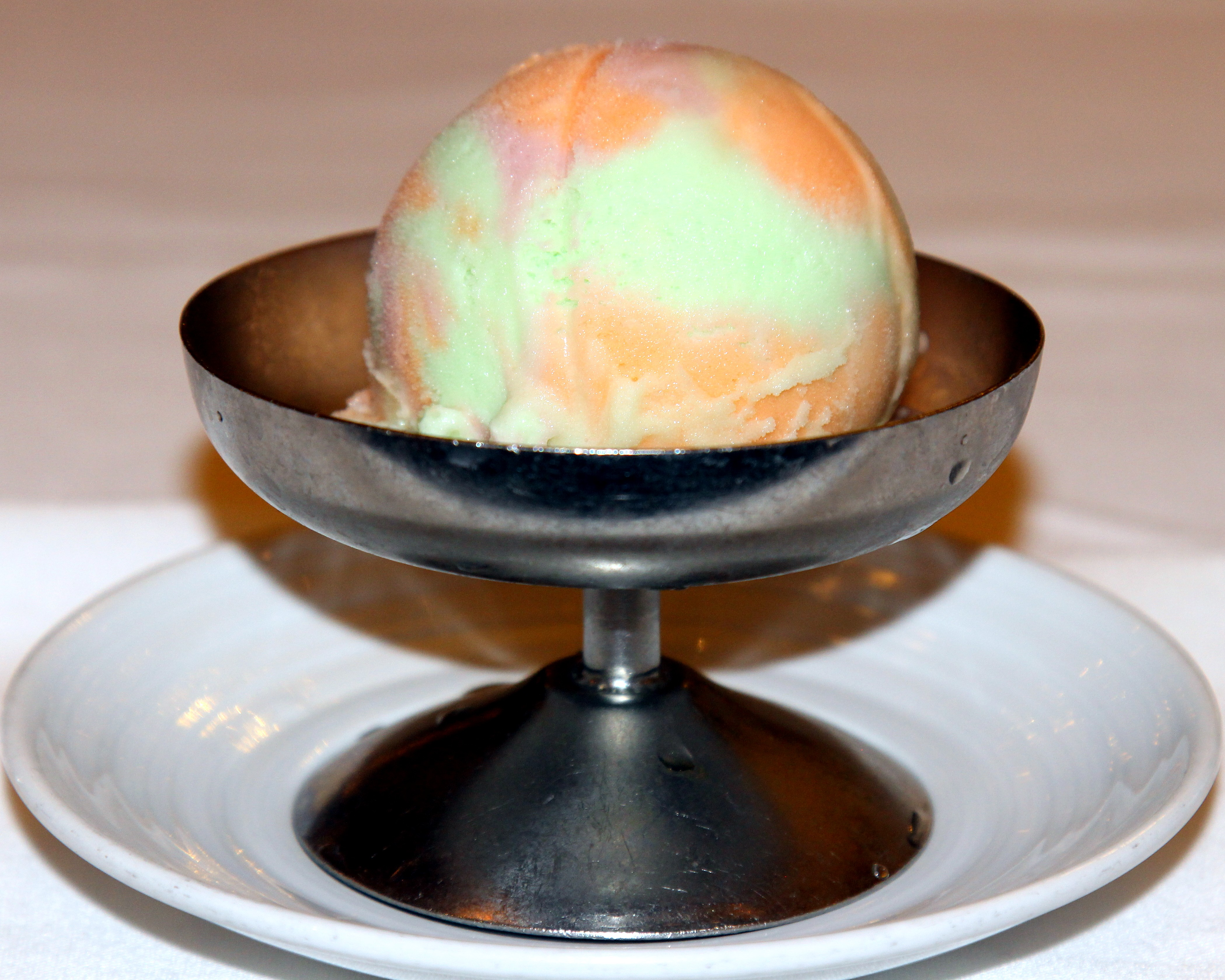
- Rainbow sherbet
- Course: Dessert
- Place of origin: North America
- Serving temperature: Frozen
- Main ingredients: Water, sugar, dairy products, flavoring (typically fruit juice, purée, wine, or liqueur, and occasionally non-fruit flavors like vanilla, chocolate, or peppermint)

Sherbet (/ˈʃɜːrbət/), sometimes referred to as sherbert (/ˈʃɜːrbərt/), is a frozen dessert made from water, sugar, a dairy product such as cream or milk, and a flavoring – typically fruit juice or purée, wine, liqueur, or occasionally non-fruit flavors such as vanilla, chocolate, or peppermint. It is similar to, but distinct from, sorbet, which lacks dairy. Sherbet has 1%–2% milkfat, much less than ice cream.

== Etymology ==
Sherbet is borrowed from the Turkish word şerbet or Persian word sharbat which in turn both derive from the Arabic word sharba. Originally, the English borrowing sherbet was used for a fruity, non-alcoholic drink.

== History ==
Sherbet is evolved from the Middle Eastern drink sherbet or sharbat. After refrigeration developed, a frozen form of the drink evolved into a dessert with mixing of ingredients. This was promoted during World War II, as it was made using milk; cream was in a shortage at the time.

Rainbow sherbet, a flavor of sherbet consisting of three different flavors of different colors, was invented in the 1950s at Sealtest Dairy in Pennsylvania, after an employee invented a nozzle that would release three different flavors simultaneously. The combination of flavors varies; Anna Hezel, writing for Bon Appétit, describes a combination of orange, lime, and raspberry, which is generally the traditional combination for rainbow sherbert, while Baskin-Robbins sells a version with pineapple instead of lime.

== Preparation ==
Commercially produced sherbet in the United States is defined in the Code of Federal Regulations as a frozen product containing one or more optional dairy products. Sorbet, on the other hand, is made with sweetened water and no dairy, similar to Italian ice.

Sherbet was originally made with real fruit, and still may be, instead of imitation flavoring.

In Canada, sherbet is defined as a "frozen food, other than ice cream or ice milk, made from a milk product". A typical Canadian sherbet may contain water, a sweetening agent, fruit or fruit juice, citric or tartaric acids, flavoring preparation, food coloring, sequestering agent(s), and lactose.

=== Historic recipes ===
Some early 20th-century American recipes for sherbet added egg white or gelatin, or substituted them for dairy, to get a creamy texture.

The American Kitchen Magazine from 1902 distinguishes "water ices” (such as what is commonly known as Italian ice) from sherbets, explaining that "sherbets are water ices frozen more rapidly, and egg white or gelatin is often added to give a creamy consistency". In one recipe for pineapple sherbet, water may be used in place of milk.

According to The American Produce Review (1913), "Sherbet is a frozen product made from water or milk, egg whites, sugar, lemon juice and flavoring material". A base was made of water, sugar, egg whites, and lemon juice.
