= Parfait =

Frozen dessert

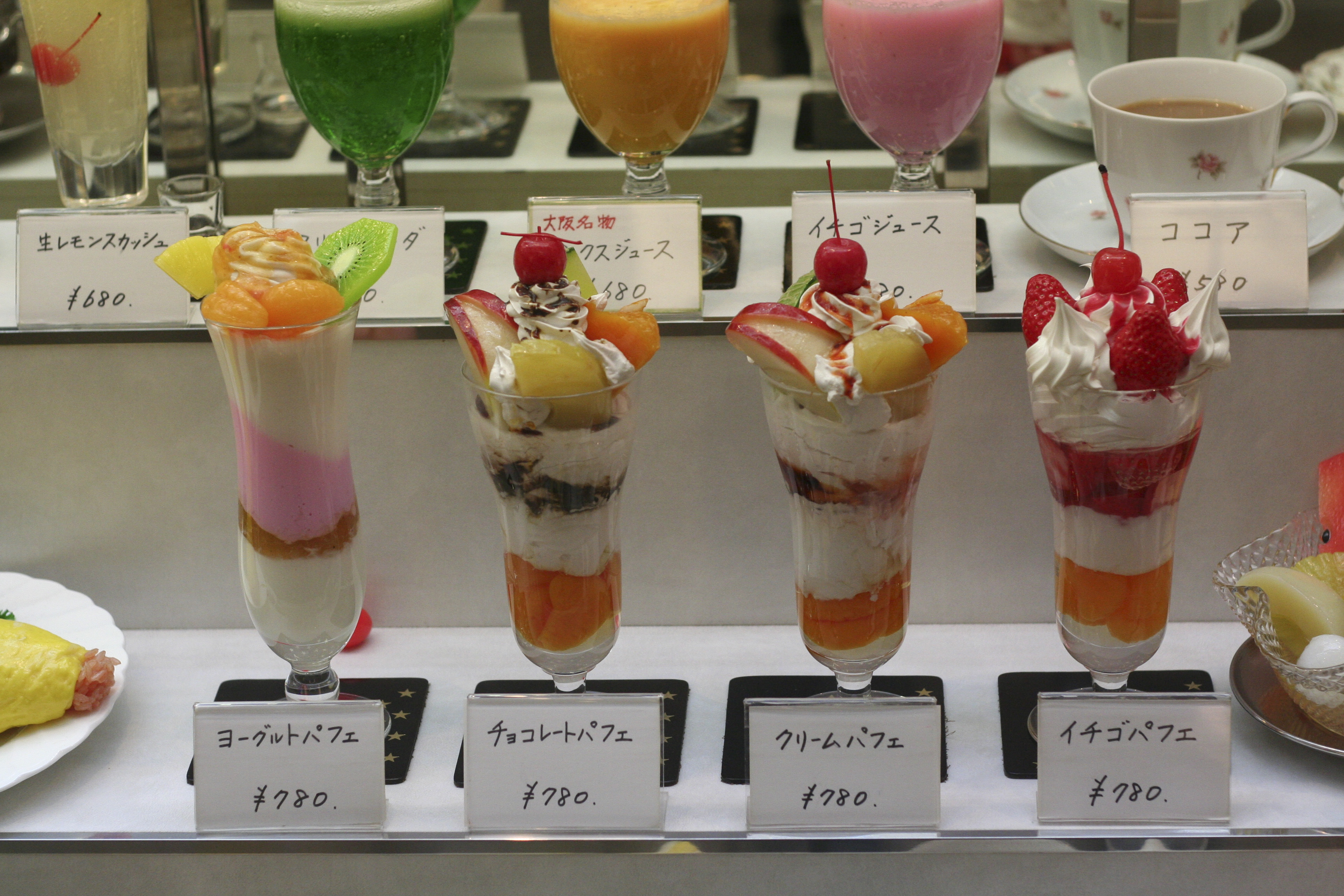
- Layered Japanese parfait models in Osaka, Japan
- Course: Dessert
- Place of origin: France
- Serving temperature: Frozen
- Main ingredients: Sugar, syrup, eggs, cream

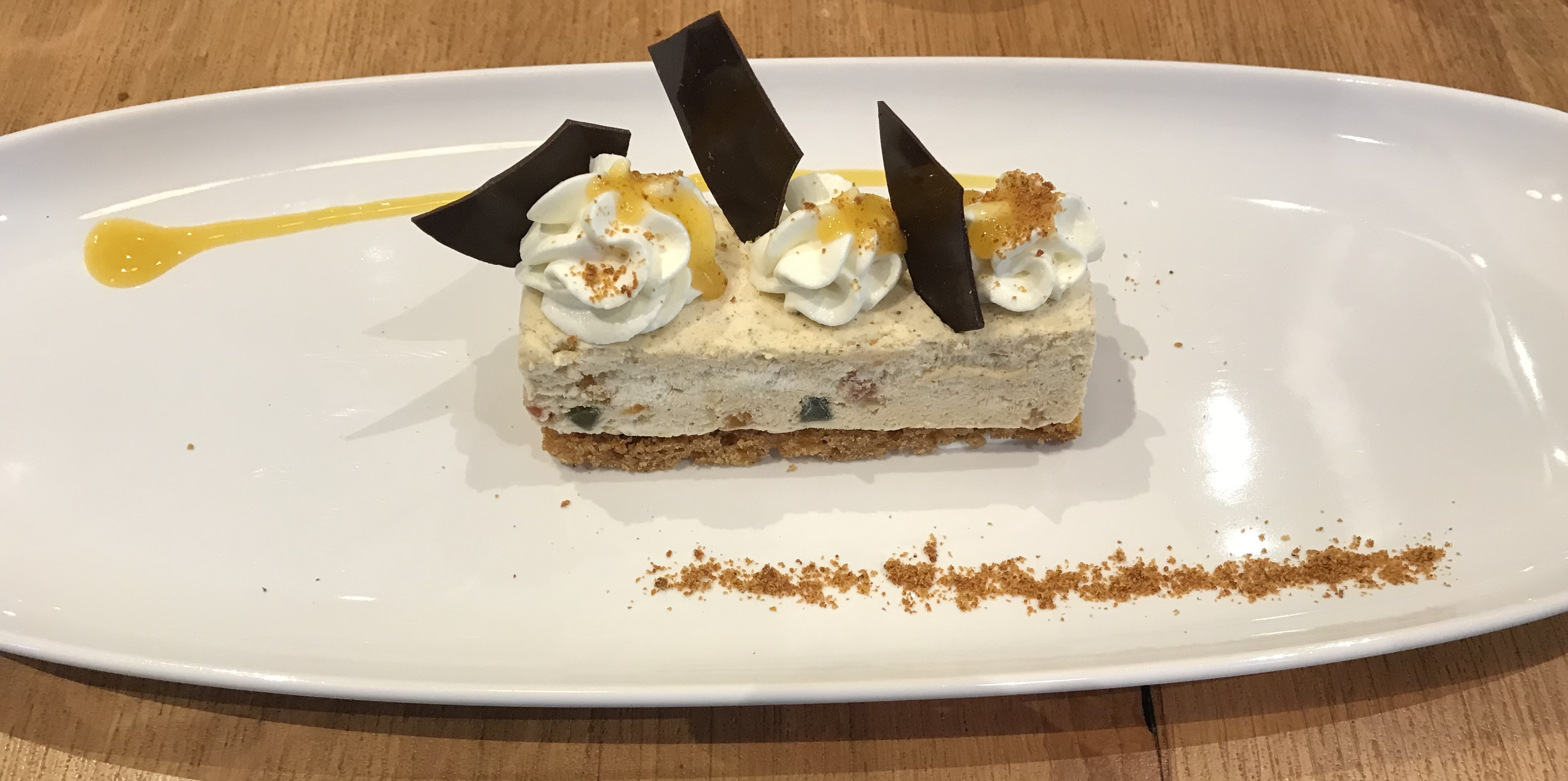
French parfait

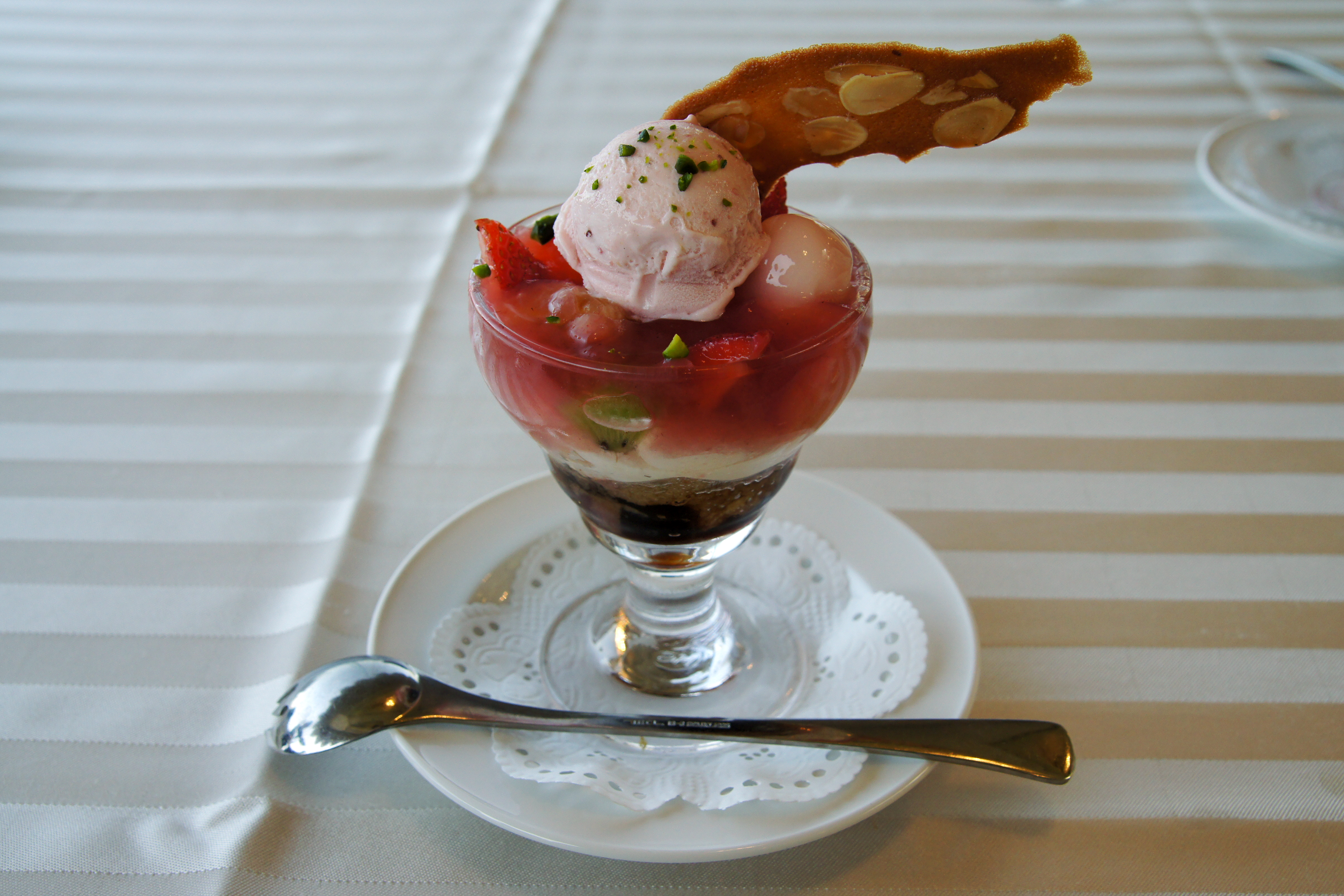
Layered American-style parfait in Tokyo, Japan

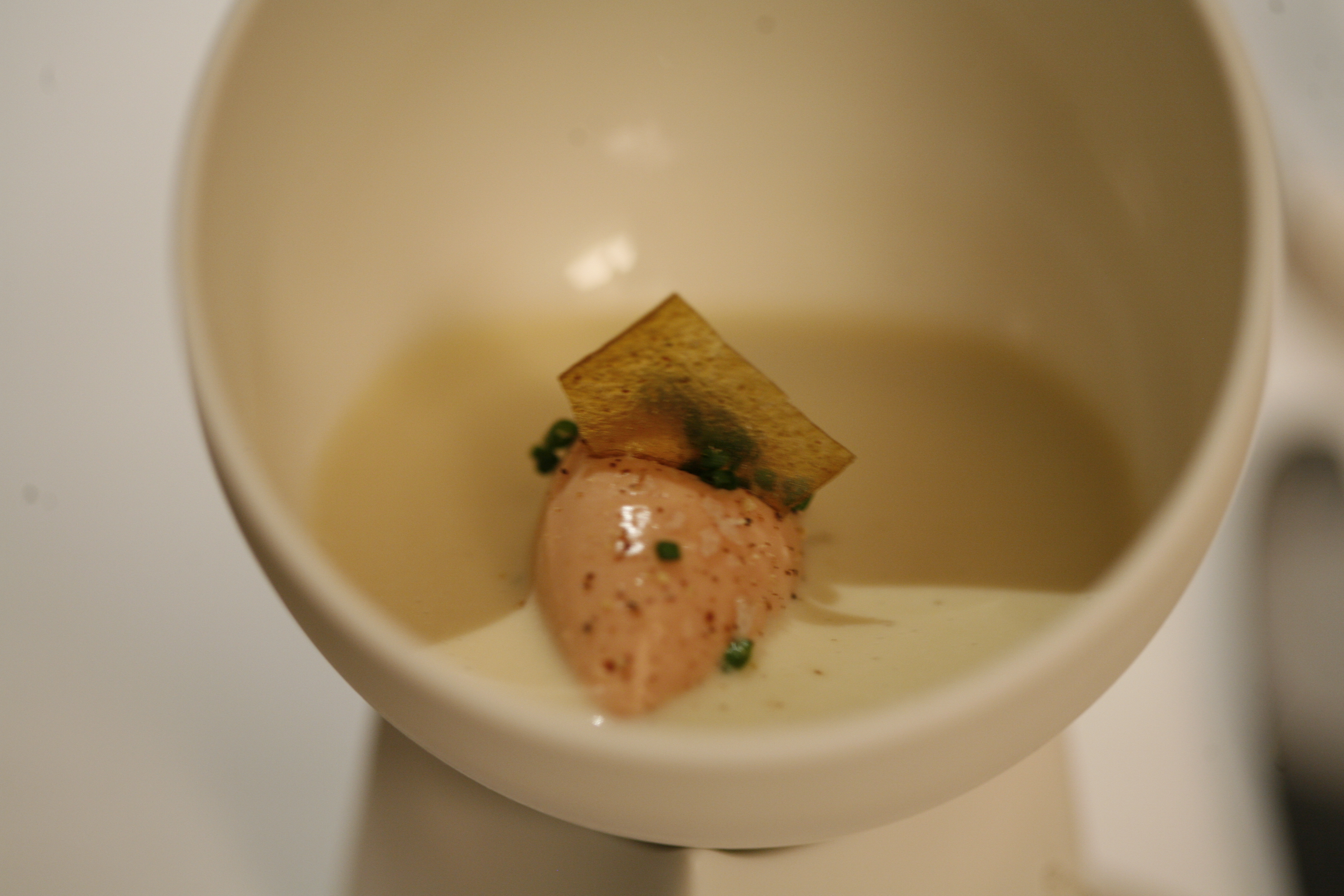
Jelly of quail, langoustine cream and parfait of foie gras at The Fat Duck

Parfait (/pɑːrˈfeɪ/ par-FAY, UK also /ˈpɑːrfeɪ/ PAR-fay, French: [paʁfɛ]; meaning "perfect") is either of two types of dessert. In France, where the dish originated, parfait is made by boiling cream, egg, sugar and syrup to create a custard-like or meringue-like puree which is then frozen. The American version consists of layers differentiated by the inclusion of such ingredients as granola, nuts, yogurt and liqueurs, topped off with fruits or whipped cream.

French parfait is usually served in thick, decorated slices on a plate. American parfait is typically served in tall glassware together with a long spoon known as a parfait spoon. The classical parfait glass is stemware, with a short stem and a tall slender bowl, often tapered towards the bottom, also used for serving milkshakes. In South Asia (particularly Bangladesh), parfaits are made in bowl containers, rather than tall glasses.

== History ==
A recipe for "parfait au café", a coffee-flavoured ice cream dessert made using a "parfait-mould" (un moule à parfait), was included in Le livre de cuisine by Jules Gouffé, first published in 1867, and translated into English as The Royal Cookery Book by his brother Alphonse Gouffé in 1869.

== Ingredients ==
In France, parfait refers to a frozen dessert made from a base of pâte à bombe (sugar syrup and egg yolk) and cream. A parfait contains enough fat, sugar, alcohol, and to a lesser extent, air, to allow it to be made by stirring infrequently while freezing, making it possible to create in a home kitchen without specialist equipment. The fat, sugar, alcohol or air interferes with the formation of water crystals, which would otherwise give the ice cream an uncomfortable texture in the mouth. The formation of ice crystals is managed in the making of regular ice cream by agitating the ice cream constantly while it freezes or chemically by adding glycerol.

== International adaptations ==
=== United Kingdom ===
In the United Kingdom, parfait can refer either to the French dessert or to a very smooth meat paste (or pâté), usually made from liver (chicken, duck or goose) and sometimes sweetened with liqueurs.

=== United States ===
In the United States, parfait refers to either the traditional French-style dessert or to a popular variant, the American parfait, made by layering whipped cream, ice cream, sometimes fruit and occasionally liqueurs. It is usually served in a tall clear glass, but can also be served in a short, stubby glass. The clear glass allows the layers of the dessert to be seen.

Parfaits can also be made by layering yogurt with granola, nuts or fresh fruits (such as peaches, strawberries, or blueberries). This version is sometimes called a yogurt parfait or fruit parfait.

Examples of American-style parfaits

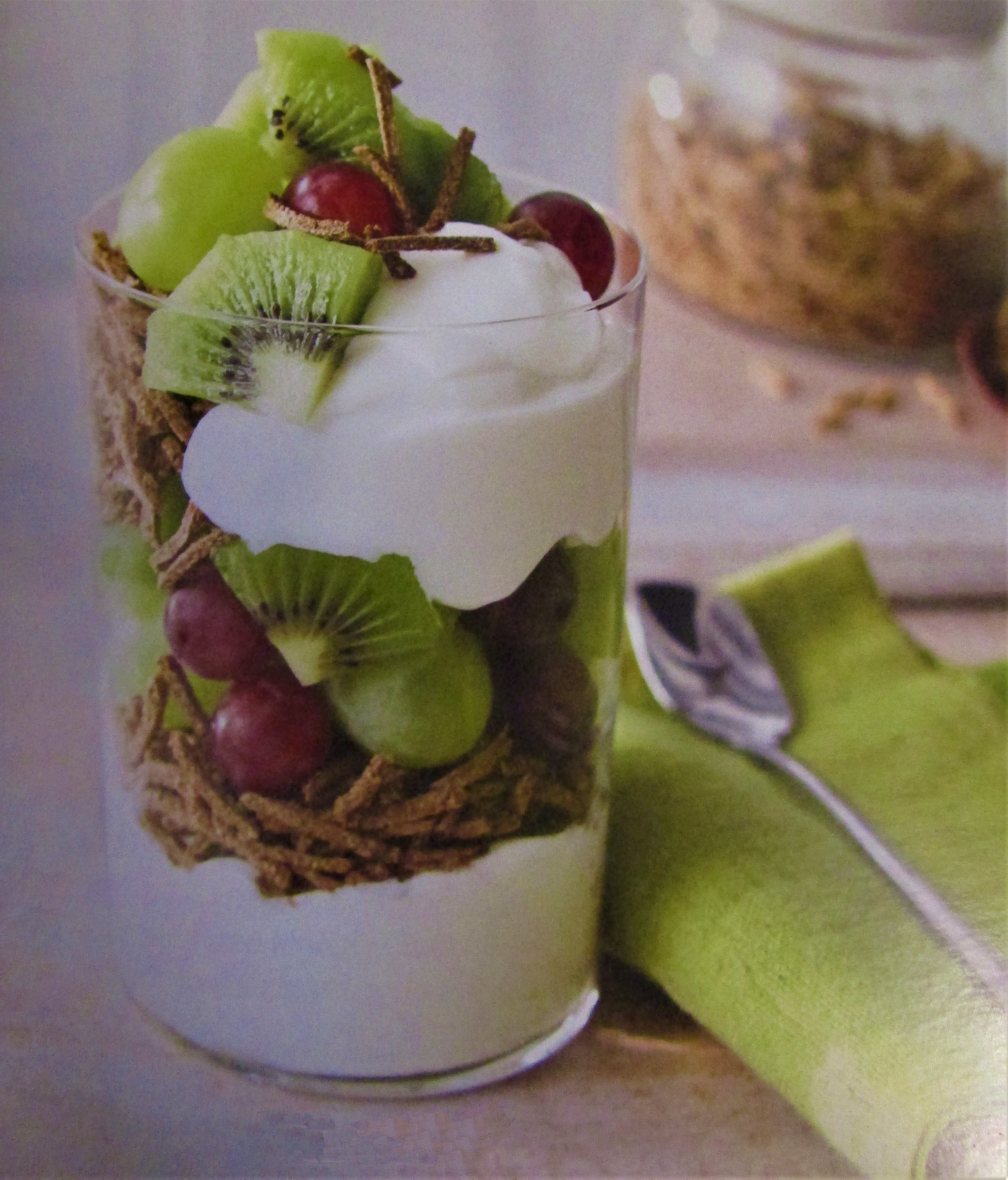
Parfait with fruit, breakfast cereal, and yogurt

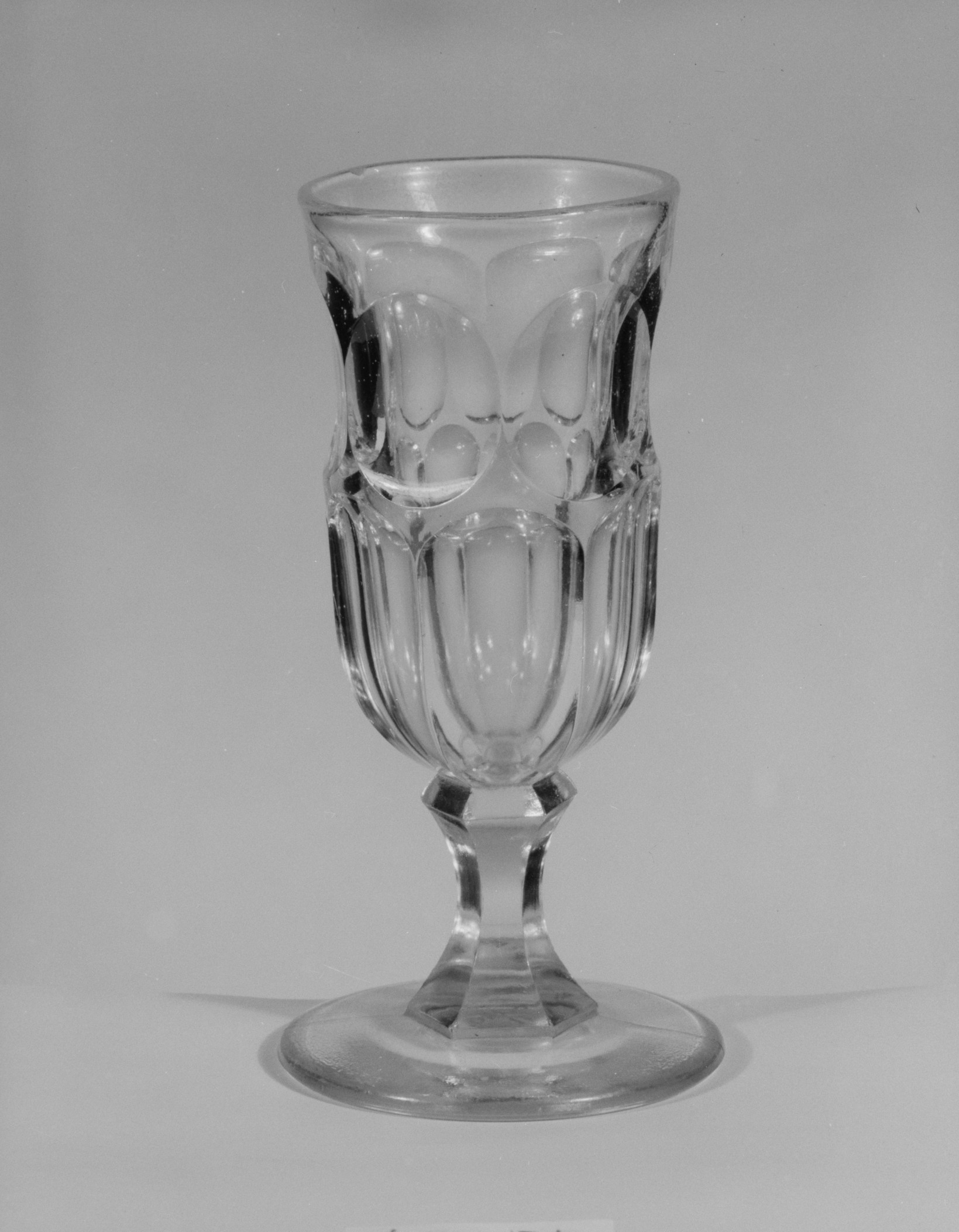
Empty parfait glass, c. 1830–1870

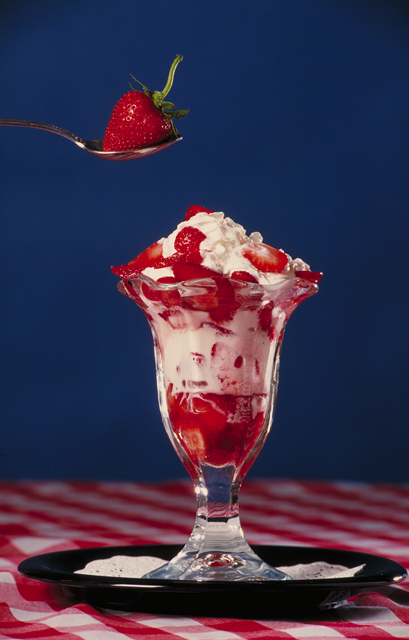
Ice cream and strawberry parfait

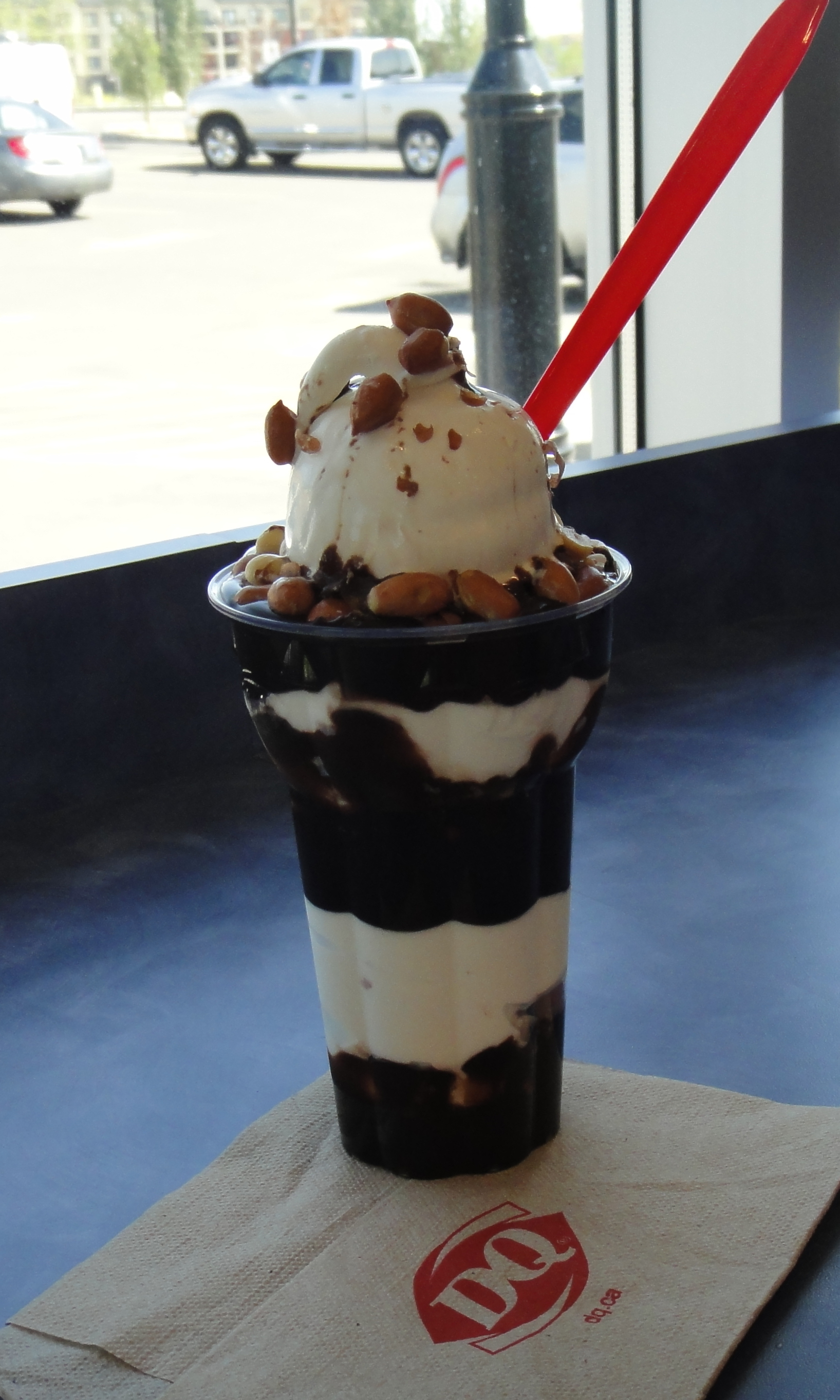
Ice cream parfait from Dairy Queen

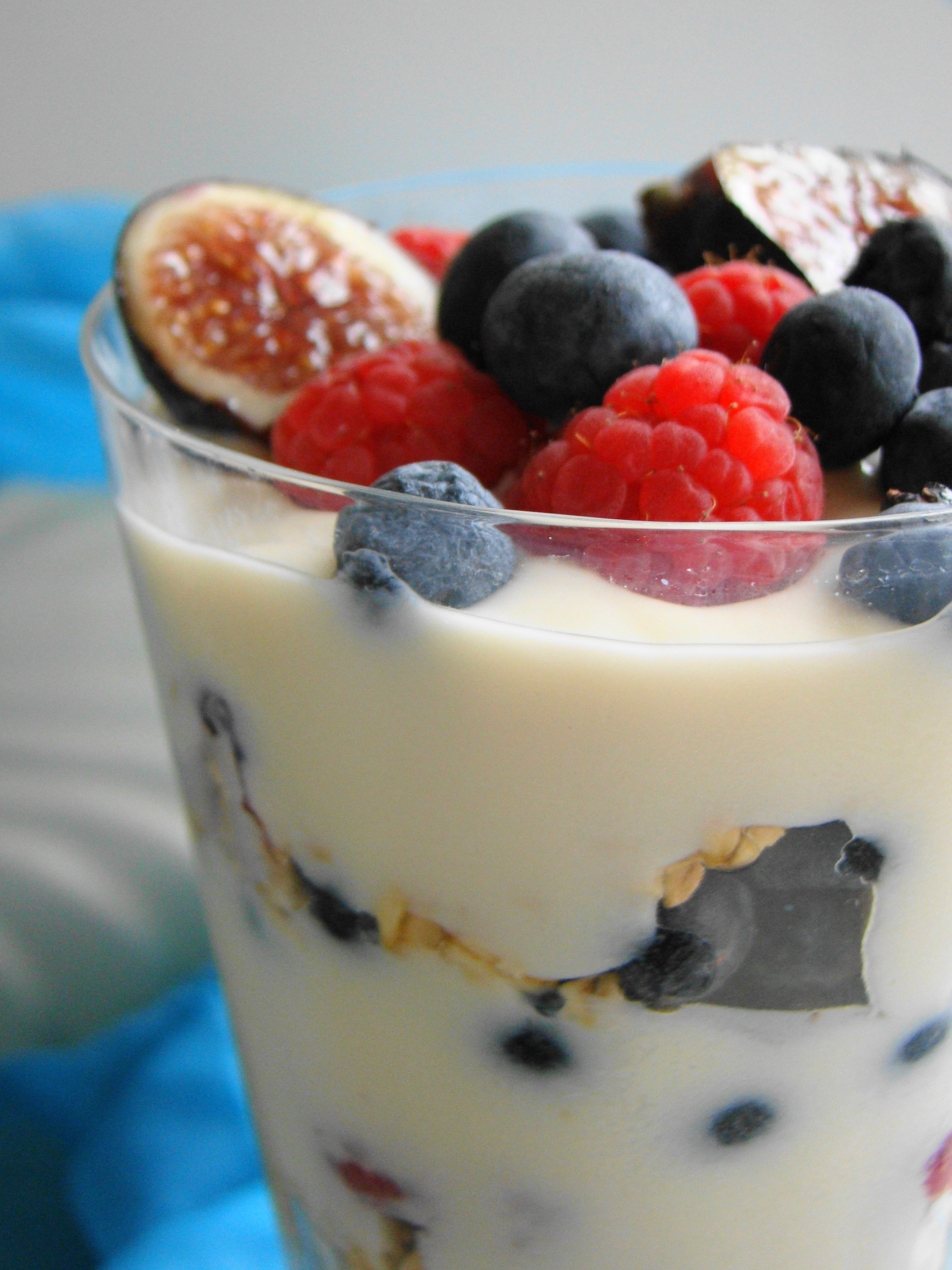
Vegan fruit parfait

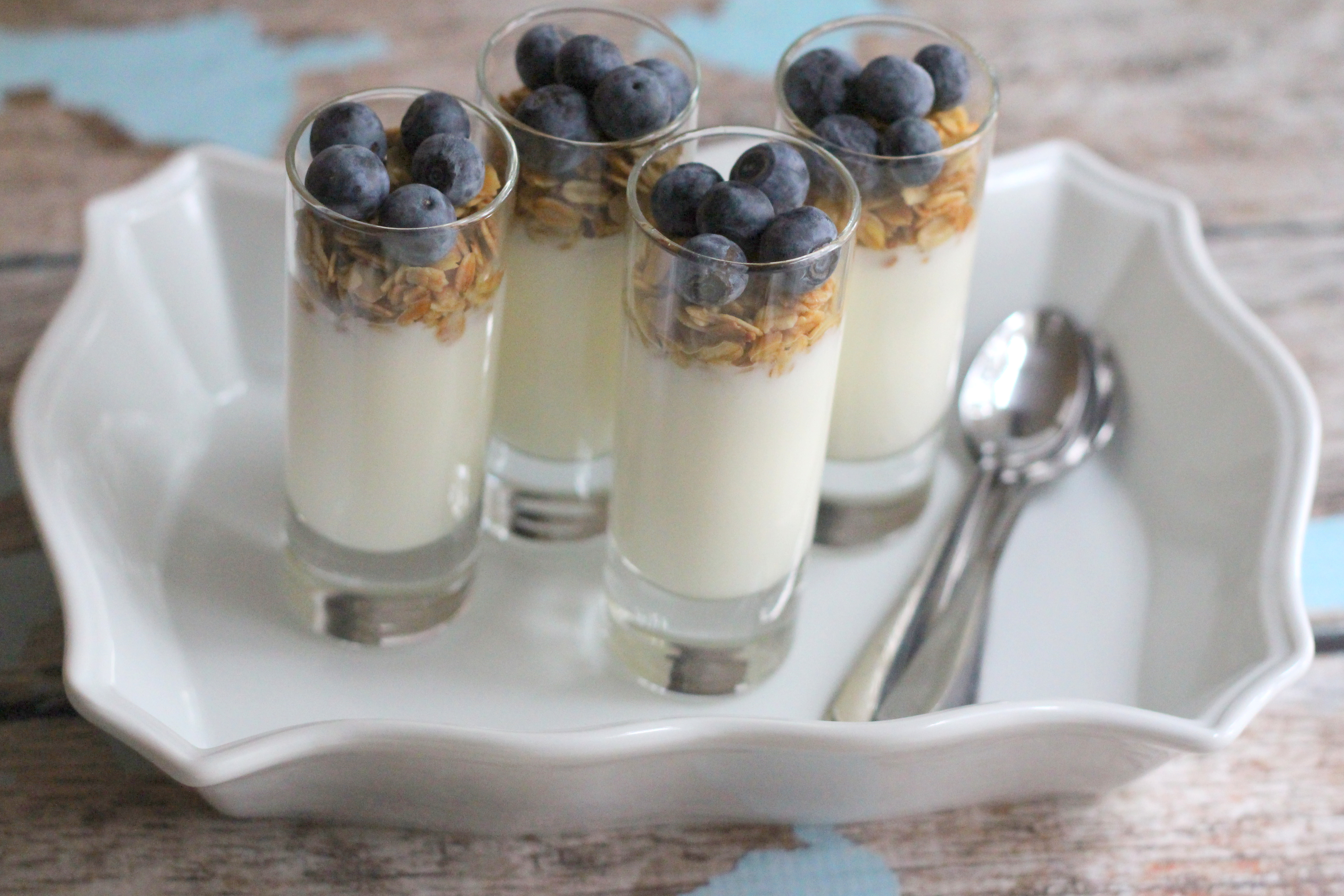
Parfait with yogurt, granola, and blueberries

== Similar dishes ==
Semifreddo is similar to parfait, except that the pâte à bombe is supplemented or entirely replaced by Italian meringue.

== See also ==
- Pâté
- Semifreddo
- Sundae
- List of custard desserts
- List of French desserts
