= Sorbet =

Frozen dessert

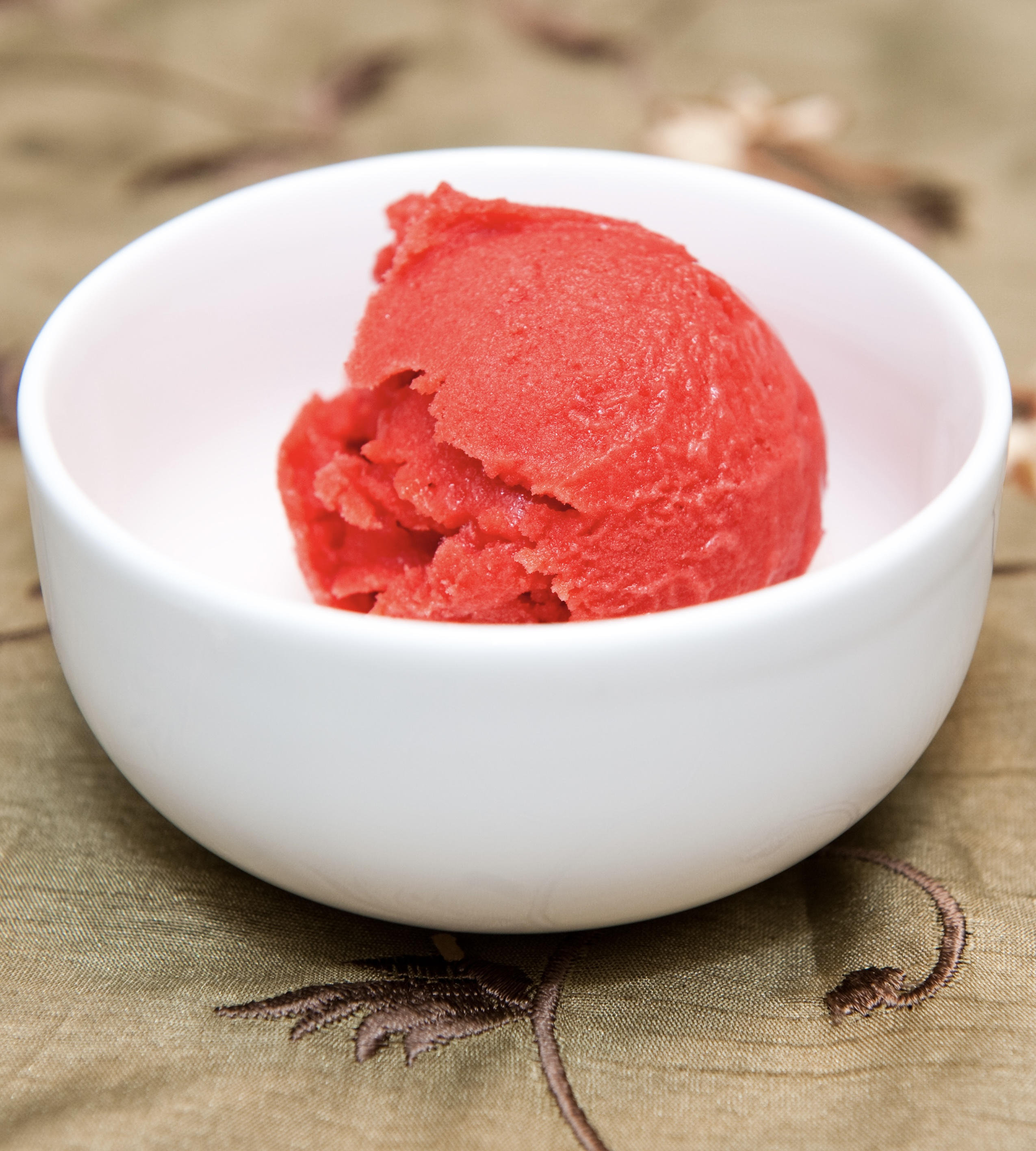
- Strawberry sorbet
- Course: Dessert
- Place of origin: Ancient Iran
- Invented: c. 550–530 BCE
- Serving temperature: Frozen
- Main ingredients: Water, sugar, fruit

Sorbet (/sɔːrˈbeɪ/, /ˈsɔːrbeɪ, ˈsɔːrbət/) is a frozen dessert made using ice combined with fruit juice, fruit purée, or other ingredients, such as wine, liqueur, or honey.

== Etymology ==
The word sorbet entered English from French, derived from Italian sorbetto, which in turn came from the Persian word sharbat, which is a beverage. The word sharbat was itself borrowed into Persian from the Arabic verb shariba, which means "to drink".

Sherbet in Europe still refers to a type of flavored drink, while North American sherbet is similar to sorbet but with dairy. August Escoffier describes sorbet as "very light and barely-congealed ices, served after the Entrées. They serve in freshening the stomach, preparing it to properly receive the roast. They are appetizers and help to aid digestion". Sorbet is sometimes referred to as "water ice".

== Definition ==
Sorbets can be made from several ingredients including water, sugar, fruits, vegetables, and alcohol. In France, fruit sorbets must compose of 25% fruit, unless the fruit is savory or acidic, in which case the requirement is 15%.

== History ==
It is believed that sorbets originated in ancient Persia as far back as 550–530 BC. There are a number of myths, unsupported by any known evidence, that attribute the origins of sorbet to historical figures like the Roman Emperor Nero, Marco Polo, and the Italian duchess and French queen Catherine de' Medici.

Romans did not add ice to their drinks because easily accessible ice along the lower slopes of mountains was not sanitary for use in food preparation. Iced drinks were thought to cause convulsions, colic and a host of other ailments. Hippocrates was known to have criticized chilled drinks for causing "fluxes of the stomach", while Seneca lambasted the extravagant costs associated with iced desserts. Despite this, ice and snow were prized ingredients in ancient cuisines including Japanese, Chinese, and Greek cuisines.

The first Western mention of sherbet is an Italian reference to something that Turks drink. The word sherbet entered the Italian language as sorbetto, which later became sorbet in French. August Escoffier describes sorbet as "very light and barely-congealed ices, served after the Entrées. They serve in freshening the stomach; preparing it to properly receive the roast. They are appetizers and help to aid digestion". He recommends that they register 15° on the saccharometer and be of drinkable consistency.

The first recipe in French for flavored ices appears in 1674, in Nicholas Lemery's Recueil de curiositéz rares et nouvelles de plus admirables effets de la nature. Recipes for sorbetti saw publication in the 1694 Italian edition of Antonio Latini's Lo Scalco alla Moderna (The Modern Steward). Recipes for flavored ices begin to appear in François Massialot's Nouvelle Instruction pour les Confitures, les Liqueurs, et les Fruits, starting with the 1692 edition. Massialot's recipes result in a coarse, pebbly texture. Latini claims that the results of his recipes should have the fine consistency of sugar and snow. When Europeans figured out how to freeze sherbet they began making sorbetto by adding fruit juices and flavorings to a frozen simple syrup base. In the US, sherbet generally meant an ice milk, but recipes from early soda fountain manuals included ingredients such as gelatin, beaten egg whites, cream, or milk.

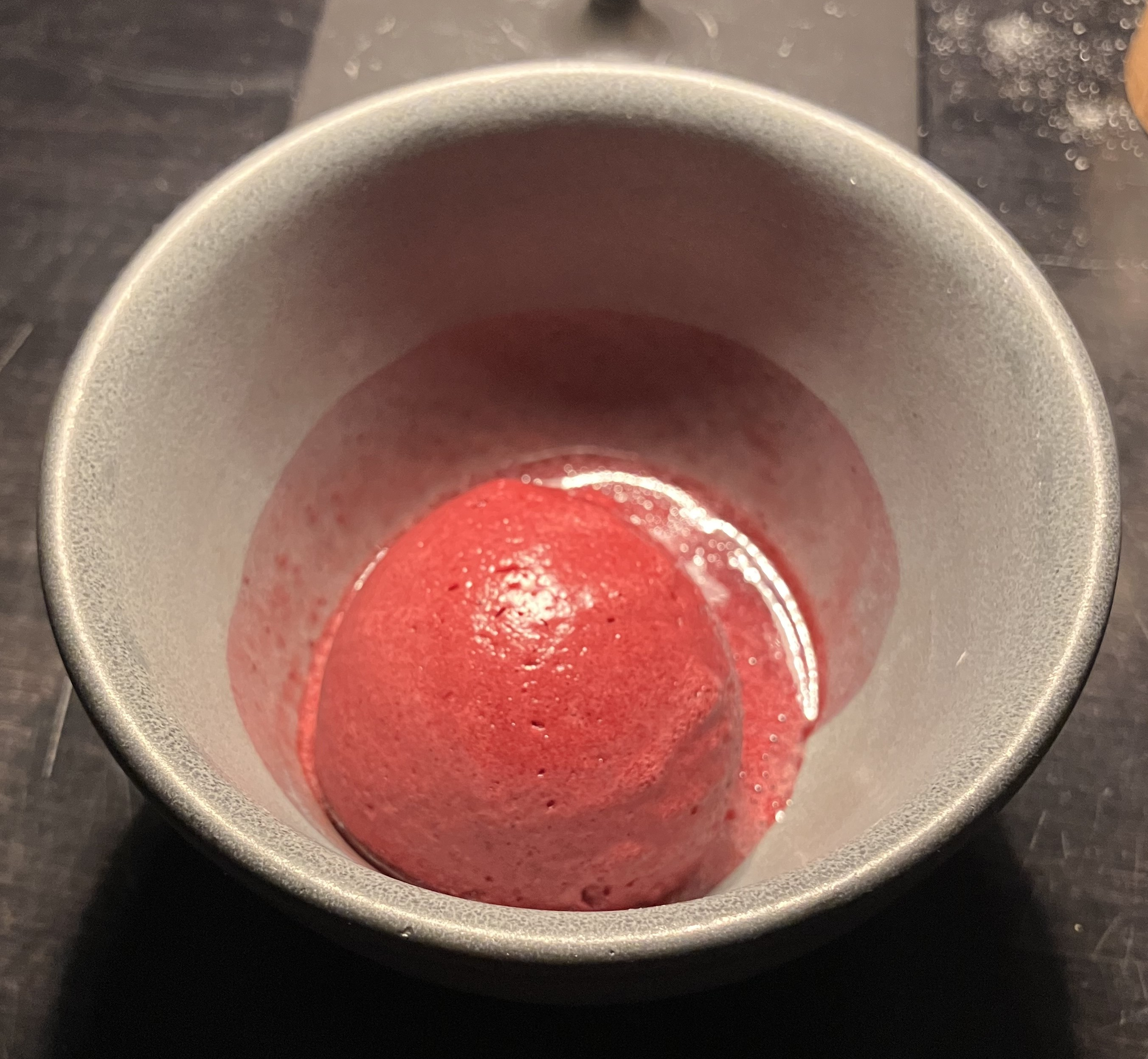
Magnolia sorbet from Canada

== Preparation ==
Like granitas and other ices, sorbet can be made without an ice cream maker. Alcohol, honey or corn syrup can be added to lower the freezing point and make softer sorbets.

Sorbet is usually made with fresh fruit and simple syrup, but other types of preparations exist. Tart sorbets are served as palate cleansers between savory courses of a meal. Mulled wine sorbet can be made with red wine, oranges, lemons, mulling spices, ruby port, and egg whites. Muscat sorbet is made with dessert wine, lemon juice, and egg whites. Coconut sorbets are shaved ice and a combination of coconut water, coconut milk, coconut cream, coconut flakes and muscovado.

Givré (French for "frosted") is the term for a sorbet served in a frozen coconut shell or hollowed-out fruit, such as a lemon. Agraz is a type of sorbet with an acidic flavor attributed by Larousse Gastronomique to the Maghreb region of North Africa. It is made from almonds, verjuice, and sugar.

== See also ==
- Italian ice
- Ice cream
- Gelato
- Iranian cuisine

== Bibliography ==
- Lang, Jenifer Harvey, ed. (1988). "Agraz". Larousse Gastronomique: The New American Edition of the World's Greatest Culinary Encyclopedia. New York: Crown Publishers. ISBN 0517570327. OCLC 777810992.
