= NASCAR O'Reilly Auto Parts Series at Texas Motor Speedway =

NASCAR Xfinity Series races at Texas Motor Speedway

NASCAR O'Reilly Auto Parts Series
- Venue: Texas Motor Speedway
- Location: Fort Worth, Texas, U.S.

Circuit information
- Surface: Asphalt
- Length: 1.5 mi (2.4 km)
- Turns: 4

Stock car racing events in the NASCAR O'Reilly Auto Parts Series have been held annually at Texas Motor Speedway in Fort Worth, Texas since 1997.

From 1997 through 2004, a single race was held each year in the spring. Following the Ferko lawsuit, a second race was added in the fall for the 2005 season, with two races a year until 2022. For the 2023 season, the spring race was removed from the schedule, and the following year the remaining race was moved from its fall date to a spring one.

== Current race ==
Andy's Frozen Custard 300
NASCAR O'Reilly Auto Parts Series
- Venue: Texas Motor Speedway
- Location: Fort Worth, Texas, U.S.
- Corporate sponsor: Andy's Frozen Custard
- First race: 2005
- Distance: 300 miles (480 km)
- Laps: 200; Stages 1/2: 45 each Final stage: 110
- Previous names: O'Reilly Challenge (2005–2009); O'Reilly Auto Parts Challenge (2010–2016); O'Reilly Auto Parts 300 (2017–2020); Andy's Frozen Custard 335 (2021); Andy's Frozen Custard 300 (2022–2025); Andy's Frozen Custard 340 (2026)
- Most wins (driver): Kevin Harvick (4)
- Most wins (team): Joe Gibbs Racing (8)
- Most wins (manufacturer): Chevrolet (9)

Circuit information
- Surface: Asphalt
- Length: 1.5 mi (2.4 km)
- Turns: 4

The Andy's Frozen Custard 300 is a NASCAR O'Reilly Auto Parts Series stock car race that takes place at Texas Motor Speedway in Fort Worth, Texas. Kyle Larson is the defending race winner.

=== History ===
The race came about from the results of the Ferko lawsuit in 2004. With Darlington Raceway forced to forfeit its Southern 500 weekend as a result of the lawsuit, TMS gained a second weekend on the schedule for the NASCAR Cup Series and Xfinity Series racing, and fifth race for the NASCAR Xfinity Series playoffs.

The 2008 race was won by Kyle Busch, breaking Kevin Harvick's string of three consecutive wins in this race.

In 2021, the race gained sponsorship from Andy's Frozen Custard and was branded the Andy's Frozen Custard 335 to celebrate the company's 35th anniversary. Despite the number that represents the distance in the name being changed from 300 to 335, the actual length remained 300 miles. It was only 335 as a promotion for their anniversary. The event from 2022-2025 would be titled the Andy's Frozen Custard 300. In 2026, the race change from 300 to 340. Similar to 2021, the race would remain 300 miles to celebrate Andy's 40th anniversary.

=== Past winners ===
Year	Date	No.	Driver	Team	Manufacturer	Race Distance		Race Time	Average Speed (mph)	Report
Year	Date	No.	Driver	Team	Manufacturer	Laps	Miles (km)	Race Time	Average Speed (mph)	Report
2005	November 5	21	Kevin Harvick	Richard Childress Racing	Chevrolet	200	300 (482.803)	2:10:25	138.019	Report
2006	November 4	21	Kevin Harvick	Richard Childress Racing	Chevrolet	200	300 (482.803)	2:03:32	145.71	Report
2007	November 3	21	Kevin Harvick	Richard Childress Racing	Chevrolet	200	300 (482.803)	2:04:49	144.212	Report
2008	November 1	18	Kyle Busch	Joe Gibbs Racing	Toyota	200	300 (482.803)	2:07:45	140.9	Report
2009	November 7	18	Kyle Busch	Joe Gibbs Racing	Toyota	200	300 (482.803)	2:21:58	126.79	Report
2010	November 6	60	Carl Edwards	Roush Fenway Racing	Ford	205*	307.5 (494.873)	2:09:41	142.27	Report
2011	November 5	16	Trevor Bayne	Roush Fenway Racing	Ford	200	300 (482.803)	2:05:28	142.464	Report
2012	November 3	33	Kevin Harvick	Richard Childress Racing	Chevrolet	200	300 (482.803)	2:06:50	141.919	Report
2013	November 2	22	Brad Keselowski	Penske Racing	Ford	200	300 (482.803)	2:04:33	144.52	Report
2014	November 1	54	Kyle Busch	Joe Gibbs Racing	Toyota	200	300 (482.803)	2:13:31	134.815	Report
2015	November 7	22	Brad Keselowski	Team Penske	Ford	200	300 (482.803)	2:08:56	139.607	Report
2016	November 5	42	Kyle Larson	Chip Ganassi Racing	Chevrolet	200	300 (482.803)	2:07:40	140.992	Report
2017	November 4	20	Erik Jones	Joe Gibbs Racing	Toyota	200	300 (482.803)	2:14:28	133.862	Report
2018	November 3	00	Cole Custer	Stewart–Haas Racing with Biagi-DenBeste	Ford	200	300 (482.803)	2:34:05	116.82	Report
2019	November 2	20	Christopher Bell	Joe Gibbs Racing	Toyota	200	300 (482.803)	2:34:27	116.543	Report
2020	October 24	20	Harrison Burton	Joe Gibbs Racing	Toyota	200	300 (482.803)	2:35:21	115.867	Report
2021	October 16	54	John Hunter Nemechek	Joe Gibbs Racing	Toyota	200	300 (482.803)	2:35:48	115.533	Report
2022	September 24	9	Noah Gragson	JR Motorsports	Chevrolet	200	300 (482.803)	2:38:21	113.672	Report
2023	September 23	20	John Hunter Nemechek	Joe Gibbs Racing	Toyota	200	300 (482.803)	2:47:59	107.153	Report
2024	April 13	1	Sam Mayer	JR Motorsports	Chevrolet	200	300 (482.803)	2:22:53	125.977	Report
2025	May 3	88	Kyle Larson	JR Motorsports	Chevrolet	208*	312 (502.115)	2:55:54	106.424	Report
2026	May 2	88	Kyle Larson	JR Motorsports	Chevrolet	200	300 (482.803)	2:25:23	149.522	Report
2027	May 1									Report

- 2010 and 2025: Races extended due to NASCAR overtime.

=== Multiple winners (drivers) ===
# Wins	Driver	Years won
4	Kevin Harvick	2005-2007, 2012
3	Kyle Busch	2008, 2009, 2014
3	Kyle Larson	2016, 2025, 2026
2	Brad Keselowski	2013, 2015
2	John Hunter Nemechek	2021, 2023

=== Multiple winners (teams) ===
# Wins	Team	Years won
8	Joe Gibbs Racing	2008, 2009, 2014, 2017, 2019-2021, 2023
4	Richard Childress Racing	2005-2007, 2012
4	JR Motorsports	2022, 2024-2026
2	Roush Fenway Racing	2010, 2011
2	Team Penske	2013, 2015

=== Manufacturer wins ===
# Wins	Make	Years won
9	(United States) Chevrolet	2005-2007, 2012, 2016, 2022, 2024-2026
8	(Japan) Toyota	2008, 2009, 2014, 2017, 2019-2021, 2023
5	(United States) Ford	2010, 2011, 2013, 2015, 2018

== Former second race ==
SRS Distribution 250
NASCAR Xfinity Series
- Venue: Texas Motor Speedway
- Location: Fort Worth, Texas, U.S.
- Corporate sponsor: SRS Distribution
- First race: 1997
- Last race: 2022
- Distance: 250.5 miles (403.1 km)
- Laps: 167; Stages 1/2: 40 each Final stage: 87
- Previous names: Coca-Cola 300 (1997–1999); Albertsons 300 (2000); Jani-King 300 (2001); O'Reilly 300 (2002–2009); O'Reilly Auto Parts 300 (2010–2016); My Bariatric Solutions 300 (2017–2020); Alsco Uniforms 250 (2021)
- Most wins (driver): Kyle Busch (7)
- Most wins (team): Joe Gibbs Racing (9)
- Most wins (manufacturer): Ford; Toyota (9)

Circuit information
- Surface: Asphalt
- Length: 1.5 mi (2.4 km)
- Turns: 4

The SRS Distribution 250 was a NASCAR Xfinity Series race that took place each spring at Texas Motor Speedway since 1997. Since 2005, this has been one of two races for the series at the track. Tyler Reddick was the last winner of the race.

=== History ===
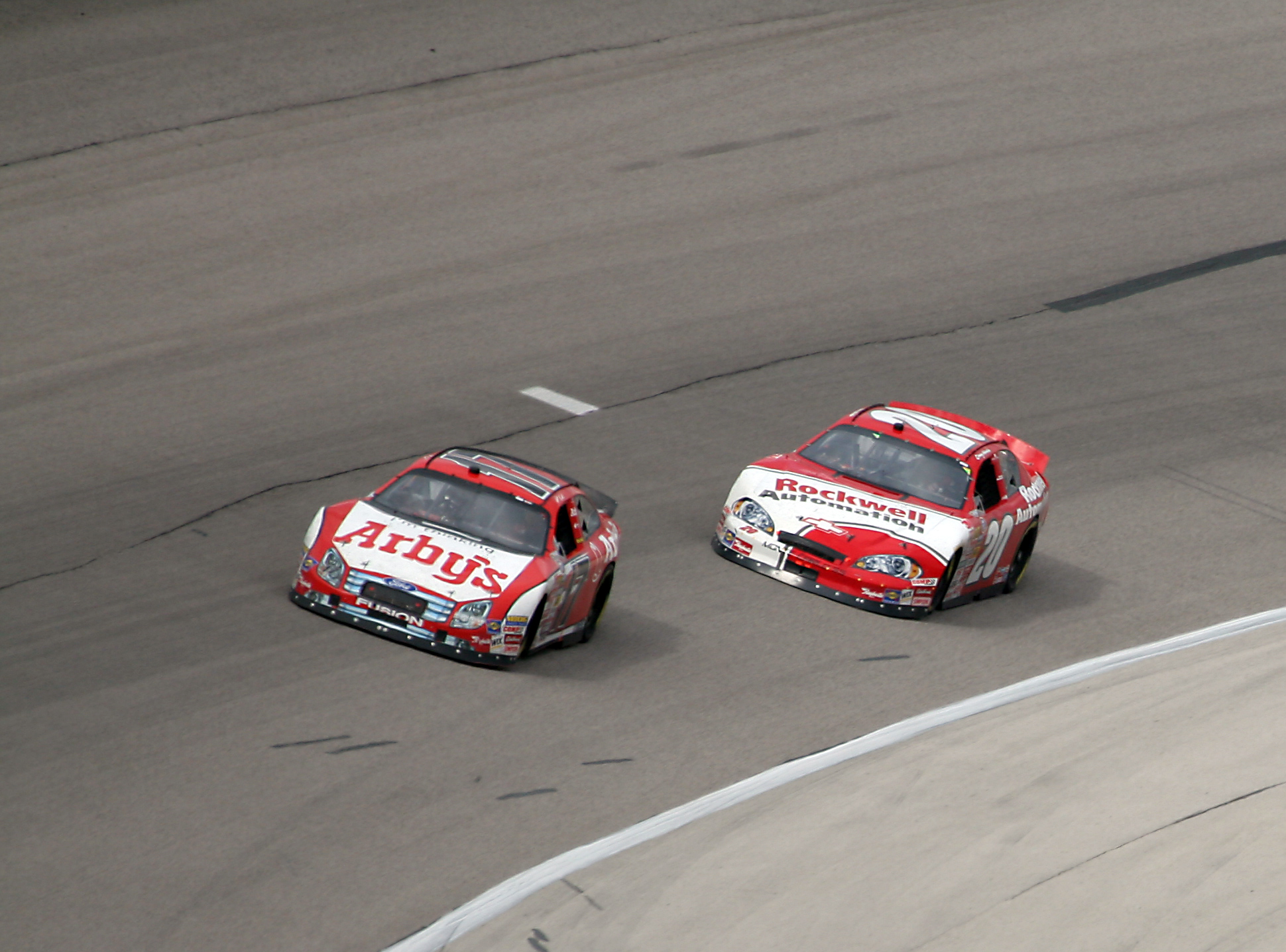
Matt Kenseth passes Denny Hamlin to win the 2007 event

In 2011, the race became a Friday night race after being held on Saturday afternoon since 1997. In 2017, the race returned to being on a Saturday afternoon and My Bariatric Solutions, a part of Wise Health System, became the title sponsor of the race. In 2021, the race was moved from April to June and paired with the track's spring Truck Series race, which had previously been held in June, and the NASCAR All-Star Race, which moved from Bristol to Texas that year. Also, the distance of the race was reduced from 300 to 250 miles and Alsco Uniforms became the title sponsor of the race that year. In 2022, the All-Star Race and the Xfinity and Truck races on the same weekend were moved from June to May. SRS Distribution was the title sponsor of the race that year.

=== Past winners ===
Year	Date	No.	Driver	Team	Manufacturer	Race Distance		Race Time	Average Speed (mph)	Report
Year	Date	No.	Driver	Team	Manufacturer	Laps	Miles (km)	Race Time	Average Speed (mph)	Report
1997	April 5	60	Mark Martin	Roush Racing	Ford	200	300 (482.803)	2:27:03	122.993	Report
1998	April 4	3	Dale Earnhardt Jr.	Dale Earnhardt, Inc.	Chevrolet	200	300 (482.803)	2:29:47	120.174	Report
1999	March 27	60	Mark Martin	Roush Racing	Ford	163*	244.5 (393.484)	1:55:08	127.417	Report
2000	April 1	60	Mark Martin	Roush Racing	Ford	200	300 (482.803)	2:46:28	108.13	Report
2001	March 31	2	Kevin Harvick	Richard Childress Racing	Chevrolet	200	300 (482.803)	2:22:37	126.212	Report
2002	April 6	37	Jeff Purvis	Brewco Motorsports	Chevrolet	116*	174 (280.025)	1:42:13	102.136	Report
2003	March 29	87	Joe Nemechek	NEMCO Motorsports	Chevrolet	200	300 (482.803)	2:32:41	117.891	Report
2004	April 3	17	Matt Kenseth	Reiser Enterprises	Ford	200	300 (482.803)	2:21:54	115.482	Report
2005	April 16	38	Kasey Kahne	Akins Motorsports	Dodge	200	300 (482.803)	2:22:01	126.746	Report
2006	April 8	39	Kurt Busch	Penske Racing	Dodge	206*	309 (497.287)	2:22:38	129.984	Report
2007	April 14	17	Matt Kenseth	Roush Fenway Racing	Ford	200	300 (482.803)	2:22:06	126.671	Report
2008	April 5	18	Kyle Busch	Joe Gibbs Racing	Toyota	200	300 (482.803)	1:58:39	151.707	Report
2009	April 4	18	Kyle Busch	Joe Gibbs Racing	Toyota	200	300 (482.803)	2:04:55	144.096	Report
2010	April 19*	18	Kyle Busch	Joe Gibbs Racing	Toyota	200	300 (482.803)	2:07:53	140.753	Report
2011*	April 8	60	Carl Edwards	Roush Fenway Racing	Ford	200	300 (482.803)	2:01:43	147.884	Report
2012	April 13	6	Ricky Stenhouse Jr.	Roush Fenway Racing	Ford	200	300 (482.803)	2:22:31	126.301	Report
2013	April 12	54	Kyle Busch	Joe Gibbs Racing	Toyota	200	300 (482.803)	2:25:20	123.853	Report
2014	April 4	9	Chase Elliott	JR Motorsports	Chevrolet	200	300 (482.803)	2:10:52	137.545	Report
2015	April 10	20	Erik Jones	Joe Gibbs Racing	Toyota	200	300 (482.803)	2:15:21	132.989	Report
2016	April 8	18	Kyle Busch	Joe Gibbs Racing	Toyota	200	300 (482.803)	2:07:33	141.121	Report
2017	April 8	20	Erik Jones	Joe Gibbs Racing	Toyota	200	300 (482.803)	2:16:49	131.563	Report
2018	April 7	22	Ryan Blaney	Team Penske	Ford	200	300 (482.803)	2:24:01	124.986	Report
2019	March 30	18	Kyle Busch	Joe Gibbs Racing	Toyota	200	300 (482.803)	2:32:05	118.56	Report
2020	July 18*	22	Austin Cindric*	Team Penske	Ford	201*	301 (485.217)	2:22:32	126.918	Report
2021	June 12	54	Kyle Busch	Joe Gibbs Racing	Toyota	171*	256.5 (412.796)	2:22:48	107.773	Report
2022	May 21	48	Tyler Reddick	Big Machine Racing	Chevrolet	167	250.5 (403.14)	2:28:05	101.497	Report

- 1999 and 2002: Races shortened due to rain.
- 2006, 2020 and 2021: Races extended due to NASCAR overtime.
- 2010: Race postponed from Saturday to Monday due to rain.
- 2020: Race postponed from March 28 due to the COVID-19 pandemic. Austin Cindric declared winner after Kyle Busch was disqualified for failing inspection.

=== Multiple winners (drivers) ===
# Wins	Driver	Years won
7	Kyle Busch	2008, 2009, 2010, 2013, 2016, 2019, 2021
3	Mark Martin	1997, 1999, 2000
2	Matt Kenseth	2004, 2007
2	Erik Jones	2015, 2017

=== Multiple winners (teams) ===
# Wins	Team	Years won
9	Joe Gibbs Racing	2008, 2009, 2010, 2013, 2015, 2016, 2017, 2019, 2021
6	Roush Fenway Racing	1997, 1999, 2000, 2007, 2011, 2012
3	Team Penske	2006, 2018, 2020

=== Manufacturer wins ===
# Wins	Make	Years won
9	(United States) Ford	1997, 1999, 2000, 2004, 2007, 2011, 2012, 2018, 2020
9	(Japan) Toyota	2008, 2009, 2010, 2013, 2015, 2016, 2017, 2019, 2021
6	(United States) Chevrolet	1998, 2001, 2002, 2003, 2014, 2022
2	(United States) Dodge	2005, 2006

Previous race: Ag-Pro 300	NASCAR O'Reilly Auto Parts Series; Andy's Frozen Custard 300	Next race: BetRivers 200
