= Whit's Frozen Custard =

Frozen custard franchise

- Company type: Private
- Industry: Restaurants; Dessert
- Founded: 2003; 23 years ago
- Founder: Chuck Whitman; Lisa Whitman
- Headquarters: Independence, Kentucky, United States
- Number of locations: 103 (2026)
- Area served: 10 U.S. states
- Key people: Bill Aseere (President)
- Products: Frozen Custard; Frozen Treats
- Parent: Space Cowboys Restaurant Group
- Website: whitsfrozencustard.com

Whit's Frozen Custard is a frozen custard franchise founded in Granville, Ohio, and based in Independence, Kentucky. The franchise has locations in Alabama, Florida, Georgia, Kentucky, North Carolina, Ohio, South Carolina, Tennessee, Texas, and West Virginia, serving a variety of frozen custard and milkshake flavors.

== History ==
Whit's was founded by Chuck and Lisa Whitman on March 3rd, 2003, in Granville, Ohio, after Chuck perfected his frozen custard recipe. Their first store was opened on Prospect Street and was moved to Broadway 9 months later. In 2012, the Granville location was sold by the Whitmans to local owners.

In 2025, the Whit’s Frozen Custard franchise system was acquired by Space Cowboys Restaurant Group, owned by Bill Aseere. After the acquisition, the Whit's HQ was moved to Independence, Kentucky. The franchise also received an updated logo and a loyalty program app.

== Locations ==
As of May 2026, there are 103 Whit's Frozen Custard locations across 10 U.S. states (Alabama, Florida, Georgia, Kentucky, North Carolina, Ohio, South Carolina, Tennessee, Texas, and West Virginia). The original Granville location is still open.

== See also ==
- List of frozen custard companies
