= Kopp's Frozen Custard =

Fast food restaurant

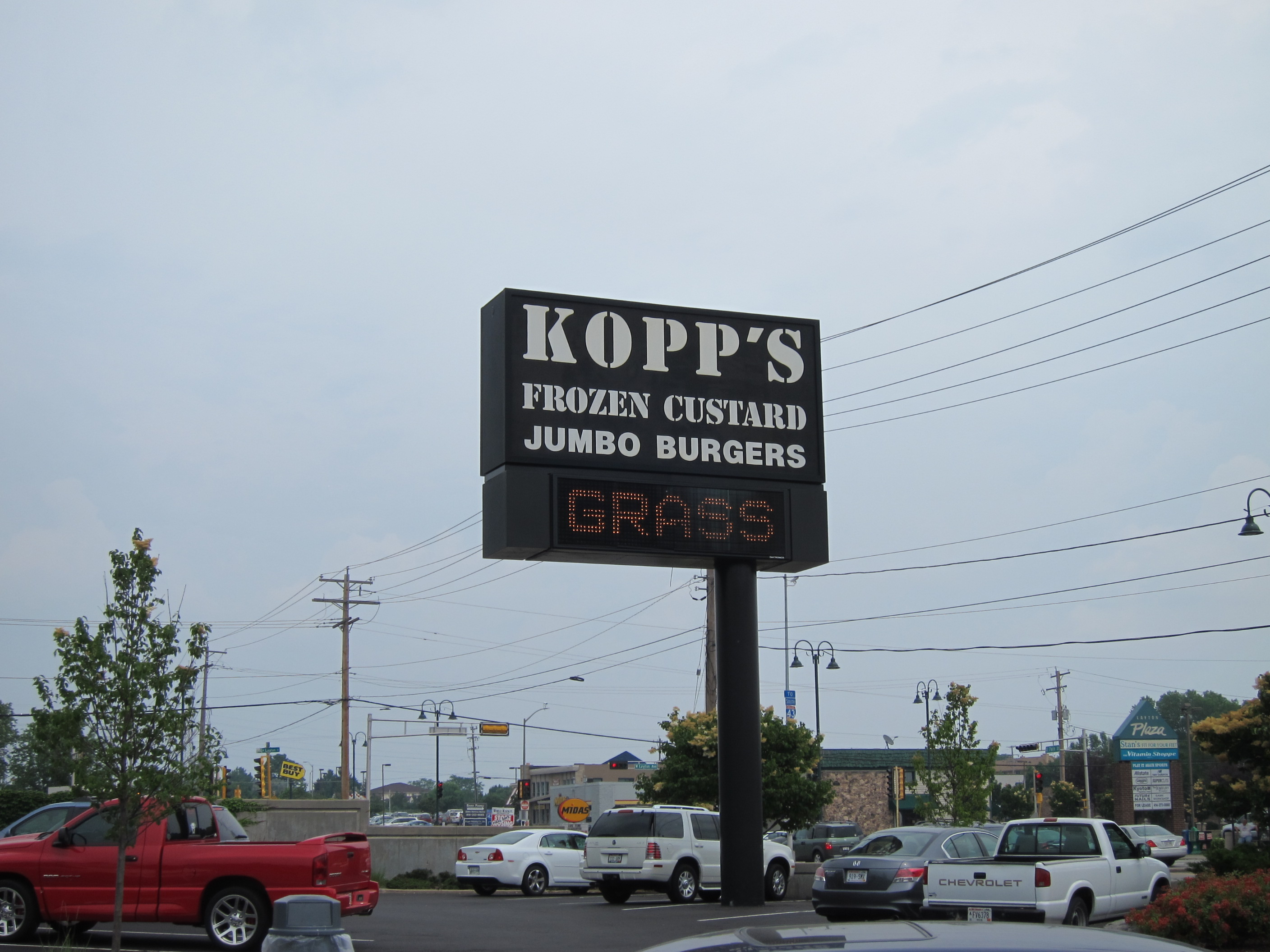
- Type: Private
- Industry: Restaurant
- Genre: fast-casual
- Founded: 1950; 76 years ago in Milwaukee, Wisconsin
- Founders: Elsa Kopp
- Headquarters: 7631 W Layton Ave; Greenfield, Wisconsin, U.S.
- Number of locations: 3 (2021)
- Area served: Milwaukee metropolitan area
- Key people: Karl Kopp (son), owner of Greenfield and Glendale stores Mac McGuire, owner of Brookfield store
- Products: fast casual restaurants specializing in frozen custard, jumbo burgers
- Owner: Kopp and McGuire family
- Website: kopps.com

Kopp's Frozen Custard is a restaurant chain located in the Milwaukee, Wisconsin area. It specializes in frozen custard and large "jumbo" hamburgers. Founded by Elsa Kopp in 1950, the restaurants continue to be heralded by local publications for their food. They have locations in three Milwaukee suburbs—Greenfield, Brookfield, and Glendale.

Kopp's was the first custard stand to offer a special "flavor of the day" in addition to the more traditional chocolate and vanilla flavors.

== History ==
=== Founding ===
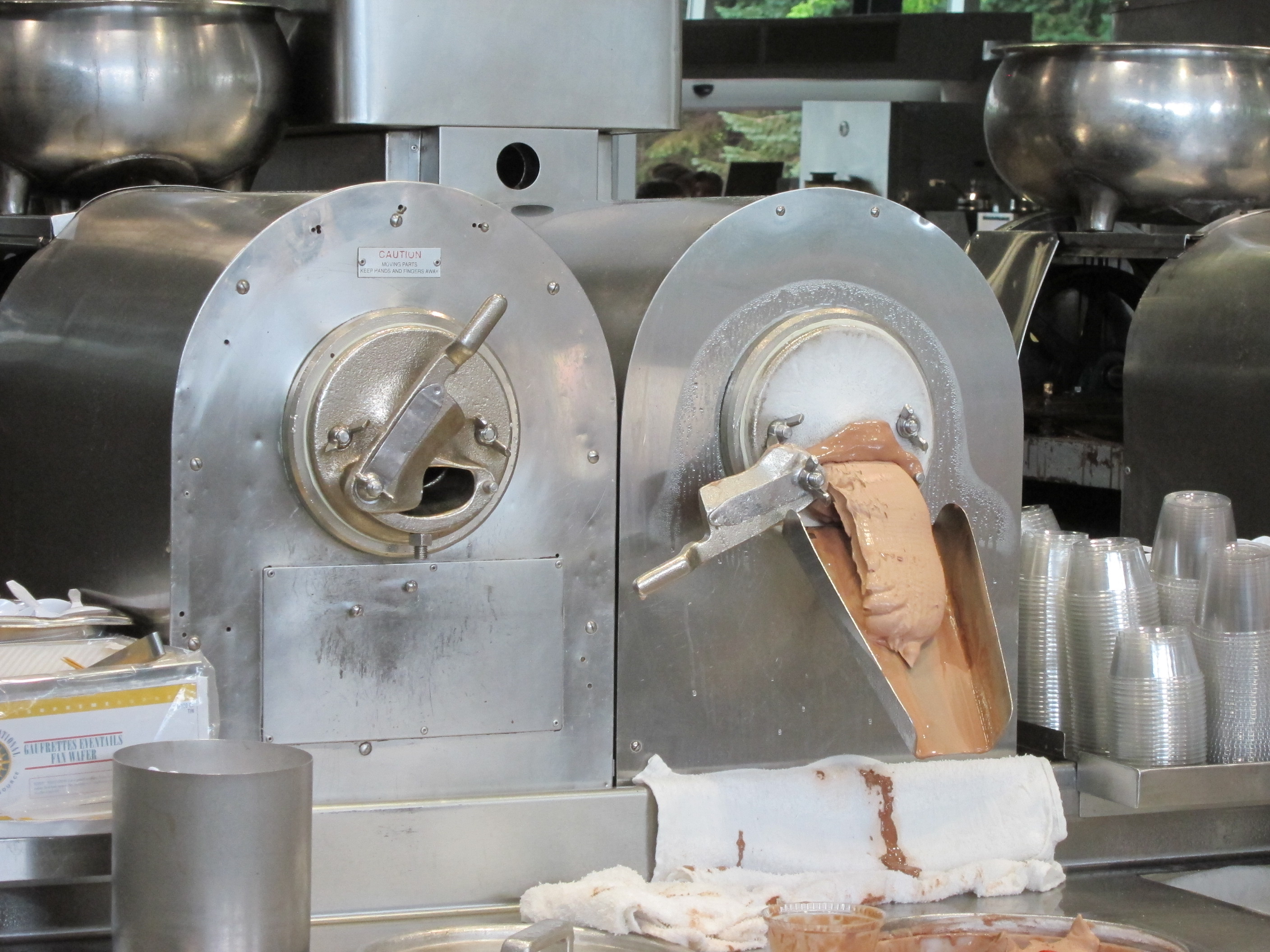
While establishing Kopp's, Elsa Kopp was supported by Leon's founder and frozen custard machine expert Leon Schneider (Kopp's custard machines pictured).

Elsa Kopp opened the first Kopp's stand at 6005 W. Appleton Ave., Milwaukee, Wisconsin (now the site of JJ Fish & Chicken) in 1950. A German immigrant with no prior business experience, Kopp started the stand after her husband, Karl Kopp, developed Parkinson's disease. Some support in starting the business came from Leon Schneider, a custard machine repairman (the founder of Leon's Frozen Custard in 1942), whom Elsa Kopp had met while working at a bakery.

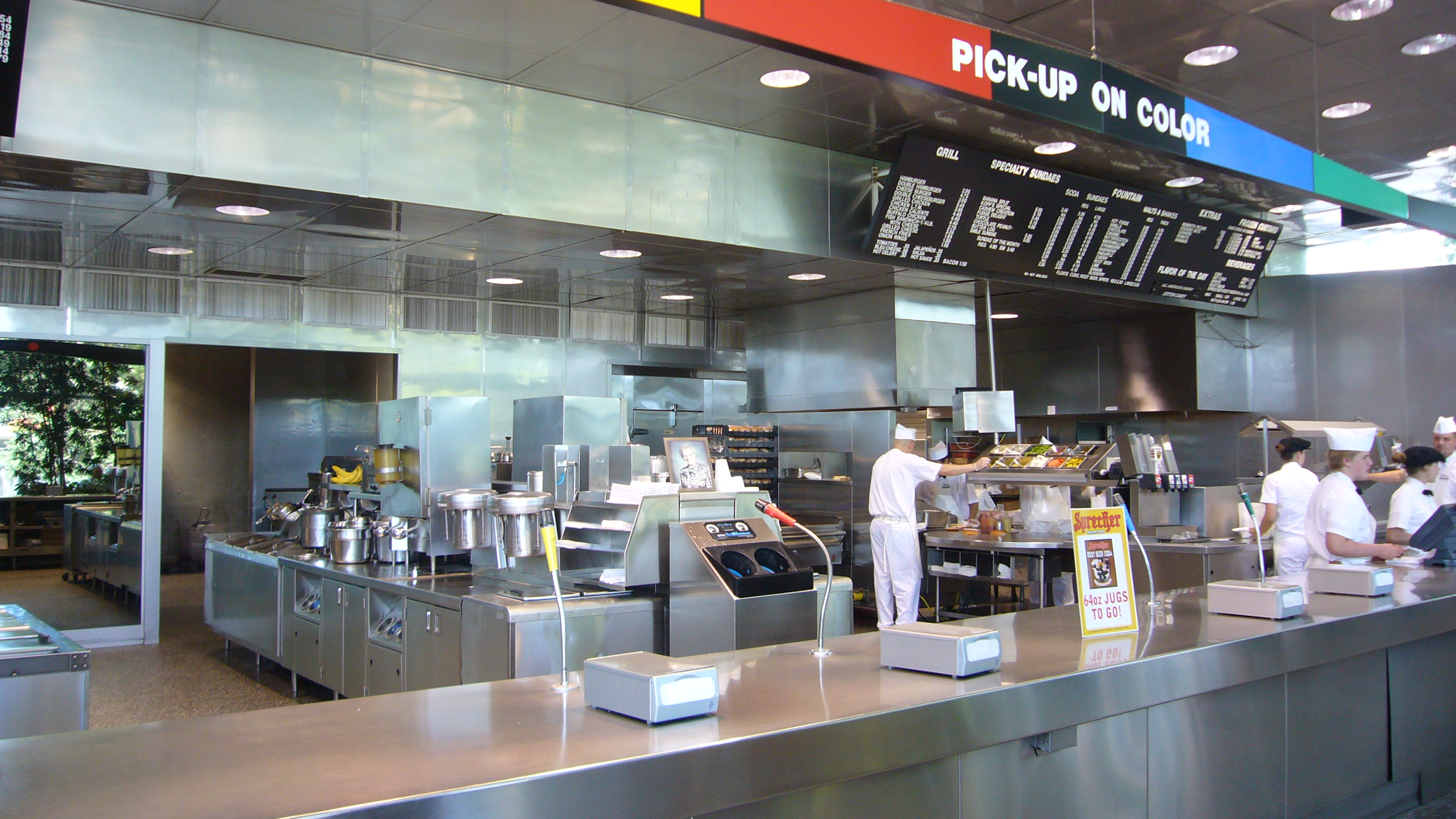
Interior of a Kopp's restaurant

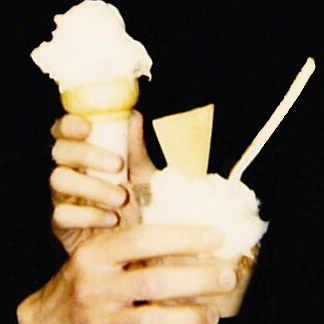
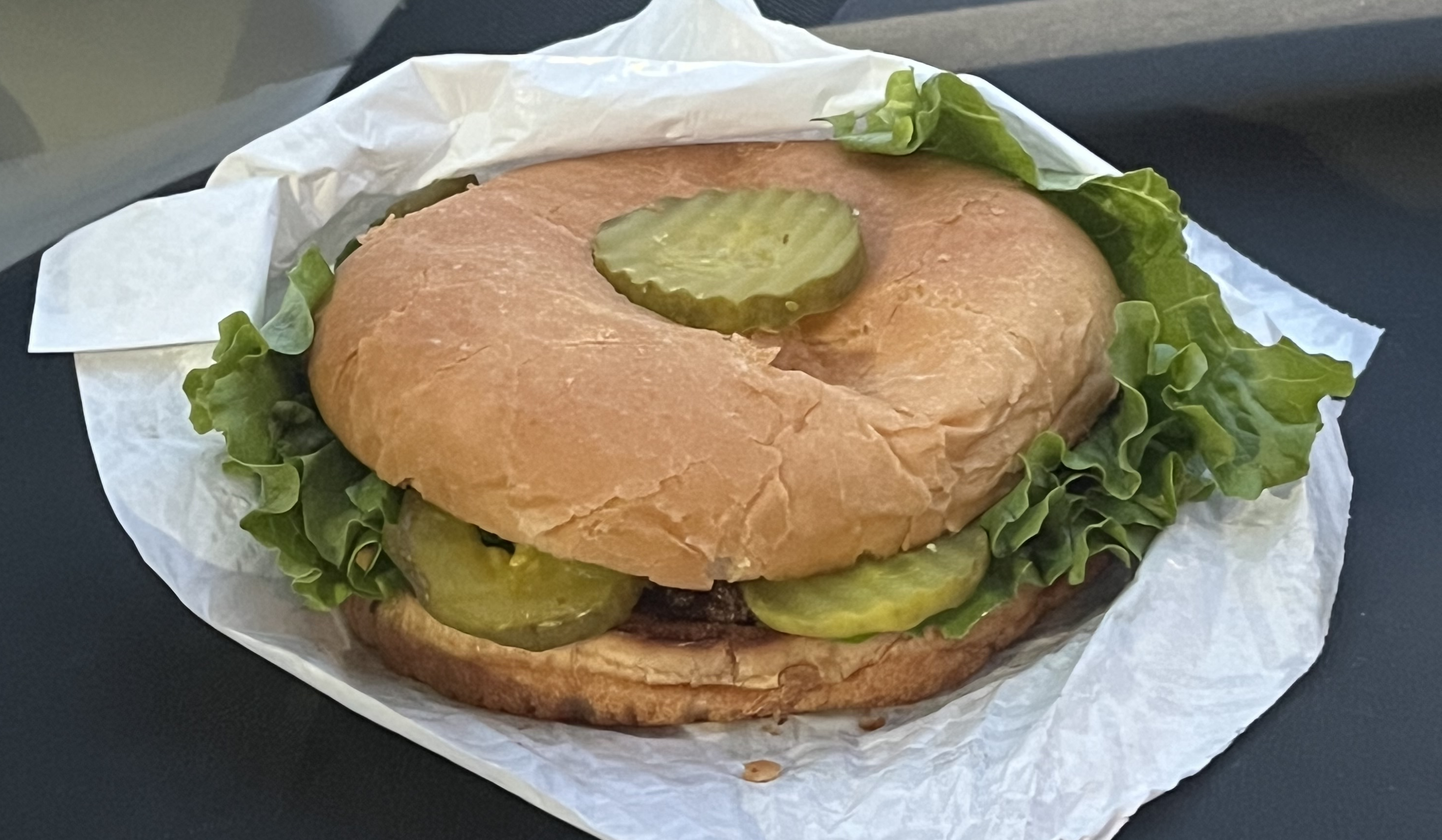
Kopp's custard and burger

The Kopp's frozen custard stand rose in popularity quickly during the 1950s and was soon seen as a Milwaukee staple. By 1960 the Kopp's stand was successful enough that Elsa felt comfortable experimenting with more exotic frozen custard recipes. Initially she mixed chocolate and vanilla, a controversial act in the early frozen custard community. After this, Kopp's began offering increasingly diverse concoctions which became their well known "flavor of the day" menu option. Kopp's offers two unique flavors every day and a featured shake and sundae of the month. The featured flavors are often related to events for that day or month.

The Glendale location (5373 N. Port Washington Ave.) is on the site of the former Milky Way drive-in restaurant, the inspiration for the external look of the Happy Days diner, Arnold's Drive-In.

Kopp's is now owned by Elsa's son, Karl Kopp, who also owns Elsa's on the Park on Jefferson Street in downtown Milwaukee, which opened New Year's Eve of 1980. He has also opened restaurants in Arizona and New York. Each location prominently displays a portrait of Elsa Kopp.

In 2024, Florida Panthers general manager and former Kopp's employee Bill Zito visited a Kopp's restaurant and used the Stanley Cup as a bowl for his custard.

=== Vice presidential visits ===
In September during his 2004 campaign for reelection, vice president Dick Cheney made an unannounced visit to a Kopp's location at the suggestion of Bart Starr. After Cheney ordered coffee, store manager Scott Borkin met him outside and additionally offered him a cup of custard, which Cheney accepted.

In June 2010, vice president Joe Biden visited a Kopp's location while campaigning for Democratic senator Russ Feingold. Biden was invited to serve Feingold's order. When Biden asked Borkin what he owed for his own custard, he said that it was on the house and suggested Biden "lower our taxes and we’ll call it even." Biden responded, "Why don’t you say something nice instead of being a smartass all the time?" He later apologized to Borkin, saying his response was meant as a joke. Borkin appeared on Fox & Friends to discuss the incident, which was covered by local and other national news agencies.

== See also ==
- List of frozen custard companies
