= Good Times Burgers & Frozen Custard =

American fast-food restaurant chain

Good Times Restaurants Inc.
- Trade name: Good Times
- Formerly: Good Times Burgers & Frozen Custard (1987–2024)
- Type: Public company
- Traded as: Nasdaq: GTIM; Russell Microcap Index component
- Industry: Restaurants Franchising
- Predecessor: Round the Corner Restaurants
- Founded: Round the Corner Restaurants : 1968; 58 years ago Boulder, Colorado, U.S. Good Times Drive-Thru Burgers: 1987; 39 years ago Boulder, Colorado, U.S.
- Founder: Good Times Drive-Thru Burgers: Boyd Hoback
- Headquarters: 651 Corporate Circle, Golden, Colorado, United States
- Number of locations: 31 (2023)
- Area served: Colorado and Wyoming
- Key people: Ryan Zink (CEO)
- Products: Hamburgers; frozen custard
- Revenue: ▲US$138.122 million (2023)
- Operating income: ▼US$0.963 million (2023)
- Net income: ▲US$11.086 million (2023)
- Total assets: ▲US$91.088 million (2023)
- Total equity: ▲US$32.746 million (2023)
- Number of employees: 2,245 (2023)
- Website: goodtimesburgers.com

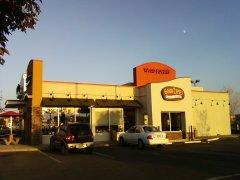
Good Times/Taco John's restaurant in Commerce City, Colorado

Good Times is a Golden, Colorado–based fast-food restaurant specializing in premium burgers and frozen custard. As of June 30, 2026, the chain comprised 28 Good Times restaurants and 37 Bad Daddy's restaurants.

== History ==
In 1968, Round the Corner Restaurants was started in Boulder, Colorado, and established a chain of gourmet, sit down hamburger restaurants. At its peak, Round the Corner had 30 restaurants in 4 states.

In 1986, Round the Corner formed a company to develop the Good Times drive-through concept. By 1987 as Good Times Drive-Thru Burgers, the company opened its first location in Boulder.

Between 1990 and 1993, Round the Corner became a subsidiary of Good Times Restaurants, Inc., and was spun off into a separate company in 1995. Round the Corner filed for bankruptcy in 1996 with Good Times as the only secured creditor. By 2000, the last remaining Round the Corner restaurant, located in Aurora, Colorado, had been sold to an independent operator.

In 2004, Good Times entered into an agreement with Taco John's to experiment with opening co-branded restaurants. This would include performing a complete remodel on the Taco John's building located on South Greeley Highway in Taco John's home city, Cheyenne, Wyoming. In 2007, Good Times introduced new Bambino Burgers, slider hamburgers similar to those sold by White Castle.

In 2013, Good Times acquired a 48-percent interest in North Carolina–based franchiser Bad Daddy's Burger Bar, described as a "full service, upscale, 'small box' restaurant concept". The agreement included development rights for franchise locations in the states of Colorado, Arizona, and Kansas. In 2015, Good Times announced it would be acquiring the remaining 52 percent of Bad Daddy's for $21 million.

As of 2023, Good Times' home offices are located in Golden, Colorado. The South Greeley Hwy/Cheyenne location has also long since shifted away from being co-branded as Good Times, and the Taco John's building has even been rebuilt. Both the existing Wyoming Good Times locations (Gillette and Sheridan) are both still co-branded as Taco John's.

On July 30, 2024, the company shortened its name from Good Times Burgers & Frozen Custard to simply Good Times.

== Frozen custard ==
=== Flavor of the month ===
Good Times has many flavors of frozen custards that rotate depending on the month as well as serving vanilla year round.

=== Pawbenders ===
Good Times also serves Pawbenders, which are frozen treats created for dogs. They contain vanilla Frozen Custard, three Milk Bones, and a Peanut Butter Drizzle. A percentage of the money made from every Pawbender sold goes to support the Dumb Friends League, Freedom Service Dogs of America, and/or the Larimer Humane Society.

== See also ==
- List of frozen custard companies
- List of hamburger restaurants
