= Shake's Frozen Custard =

Shake's Frozen Custard is a frozen custard retailer and franchise founded by Don and Debbie Osborne in Joplin, Missouri in 1991. It was originally opened as Shakey's Frozen Custard but was changed to Shake's in 2001 in order to secure trademarks. The Osborne's experimented with a variety of recipes and menu items to devise their recipe. Corey Osborne, Don's oldest son, opened the second location in Fayetteville, Arkansas in 1997. Some of their popular menu items include concretes, sundaes, shakes, floats, splits, and more.

== Franchise ==
In 1999, the company began offering franchises and incorporated in Arkansas as Shake's Frozen Custard, Inc. Currently the franchise chain has five stores in operation across four states with many future locations planned.

== See also ==
- List of frozen custard companies
