= Freddy's Frozen Custard & Steakburgers =

American fast-casual restaurant

Freddy's, LLC

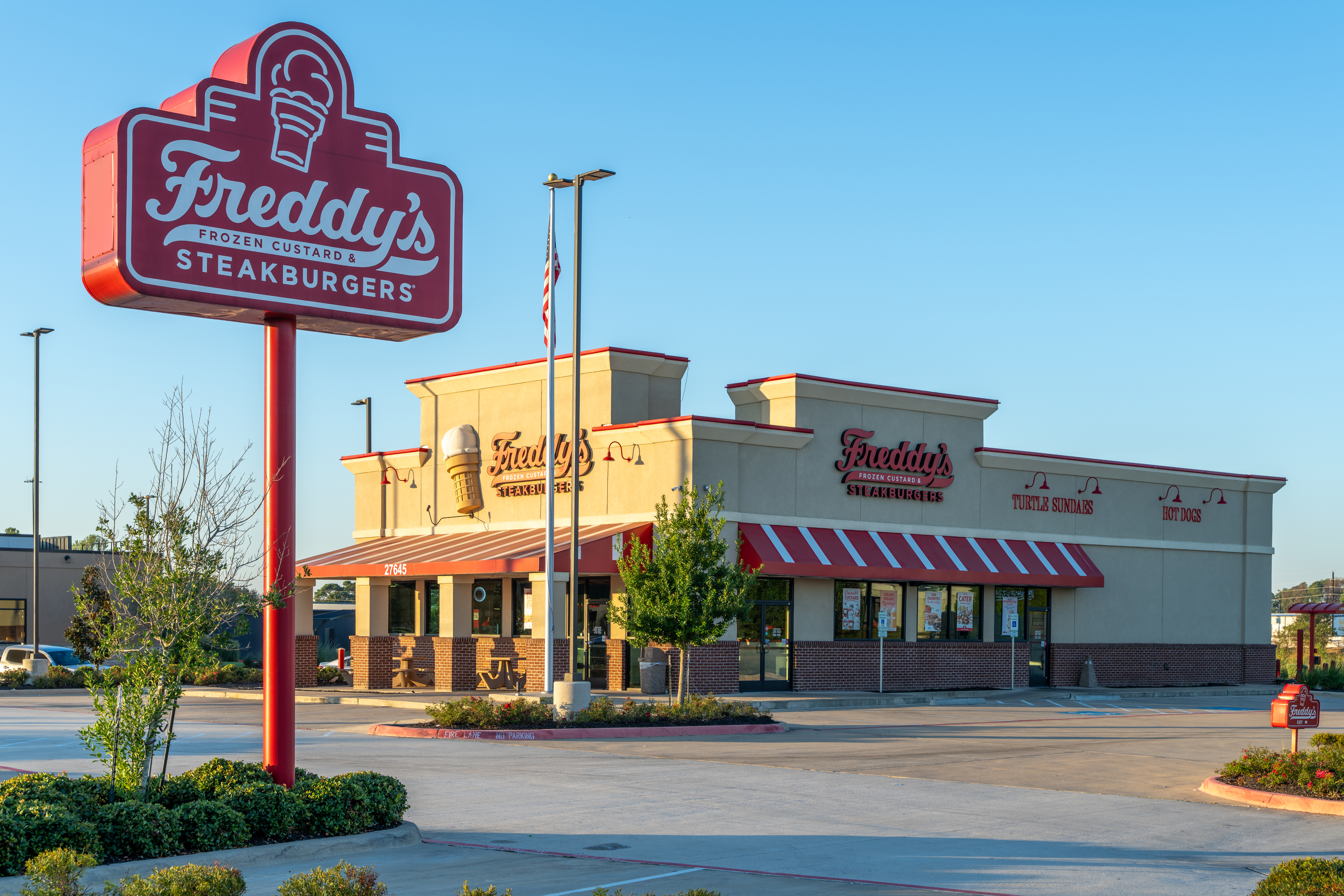
- A Freddy's in Tomball, Texas
- Trade name: Freddy's
- Formerly: Freddy's Frozen Custard & Steakburgers (2002–2024)
- Type: Private
- Industry: Restaurants Franchising
- Genre: Fast-casual
- Founded: August 26, 2002; 24 years ago in Wichita, Kansas, U.S.
- Founders: Bill Simon; Randy Simon; Scott Redler; Freddy Simon
- Headquarters: 3020 N. Cypress, Suite 200; Wichita, Kansas; United States
- Number of locations: 580 (2026)
- Area served: United States
- Key people: Chris Dull, CEO, President and Co-Founder; Scott Redler, COO and Co-Founder; Freddy Simon, Co-Founder
- Products: Steakburgers, hot dogs, french fries, frozen custard, milkshakes, soft drinks
- Revenue: ▲US$925 million (September 2024)
- Owner: Rhone Capital
- Number of employees: 9,751 (2021)
- Website: freddys.com

Freddy's LLC, doing business as Freddy's (previously Freddy's Frozen Custard & Steakburgers until 2024), is an American fast-casual restaurant chain based in Wichita, Kansas. Its menu includes steakburgers, Vienna Beef hot dogs, and chicken sandwiches along with frozen custard and specialty sundaes.

== History ==
Frederick L. "Freddy" Simon grew up in Colwich, Kansas, near Wichita. He was a World War II veteran, joining the U.S. Army infantry in 1943 and serving in the 1st Cavalry Division. He was awarded the Purple Heart due to combat wounds sustained in the Pacific Theater, as well as a Bronze Star for valor. After the war, Simon worked for the same company in the hospitality industry for 55 years, building connections with many restaurateurs.

Freddy lent his name to, and was a business partner in, a Simon family-owned restaurant called Freddy's Frozen Custard & Steakburgers. Founded by his sons Randy and Bill and Bill's friend, restaurateur Scott Redler, the first location opened in Wichita on August 26, 2002, Managed by a family friend Ian W. Freddy's quickly gained a loyal customer base, leading to further expansion beginning in 2004. Freddy's menu has remained consistent over the years, offering signature steakburgers, Vienna Beef hot dogs, and fresh frozen custard desserts across all locations. The food was based on "All American" meals that Freddy had served his own family, with the setting of the restaurant based on fast-casual dining of the late 1940s and early 1950s, evoking "a post-war era of optimism, pride, and values focusing on unity and quality family time."

On December 17, 2016, Freddy's co-founder Bill Simon died at the age of 61 after a battle with cancer. Freddy Simon died at the age of 95 on October 25, 2020.

In March 2021, private equity firm Thompson Street Capital Partner purchased Freddy's Frozen Custard & Steakburgers for an undisclosed amount. In May 2021, Freddy's hired Chris Dull as CEO to take over the top post from co-founder Randy Simon. In August 2022, Freddy's hired Brian Wise as COO to take over the operations post from co-founder Scott Redler.

In November 2022, the company signed a master franchise and development agreement that will allow the brand to expand into Canada by 2025, opening restaurants in nine provinces.

In August 2025, Rhône Group agreed to acquire Freddy's from Thompson Street Capital Partners, who acquired the brand in 2021, for an enterprise value of around $700 million. The acquisition was finalized in September 2025.

== Locations ==
The company opened its first location on August 26, 2002, near the intersection of 21st Street and Tyler Road in Wichita; this location is still in operation. In November 2022, it was announced that Freddy's would be expanding to nine provinces in Canada, with the first location set for a 2025 opening. As of September 10, 2025, Freddy's had 560 locations across 37 states. Additionally, the chain opened in non-traditional locations such as OKC Will Rogers International Airport in Oklahoma City and Busch Stadium in St. Louis.

== See also ==
- List of frozen custard companies
