= Rita's Italian Ice =

American quick service dessert restaurant chain

Rita's Franchise Company, LLC
- Type: Private
- Industry: Dessert shop
- Genre: Quick Service
- Founded: May 4, 1984; 42 years ago
- Founder: Bob Tumolo
- Headquarters: Trevose, Pennsylvania, U.S.
- Number of locations: 594
- Area served: 30 U.S. states
- Key people: Kirk Griswold, Chairman; Linda Chadwick, President & CEO
- Products: Italian ice frozen custard frozen treats
- Revenue: ▲US$51 million (2019)
- Owner: Argosy Private Equity (50%); MTN Capital (50%)
- Number of employees: 5,000 (2021)
- Website: ritasice.com

Rita’s Italian Ice & Frozen Custard (originally and now informally known as Rita's Water Ice) is a privately owned and operated American quick service restaurant chain originating in the Philadelphia metropolitan area that expanded into 30 states, mostly in the Mid-Atlantic region. The chain is known for its Italian ice, or water ice, and frozen custard but also offers multiple other types of frozen treats and specialty creations.

Rita's opened its first restaurant in 1984 in Bensalem Township, Pennsylvania, a township outside of Philadelphia, and the company gradually expanded throughout the Philadelphia metropolitan area before eventually opening locations outside the region. The company is currently headquartered in Trevose, Pennsylvania. As of June 13, 2025, the chain has 594 restaurants in 30 states.

== History ==
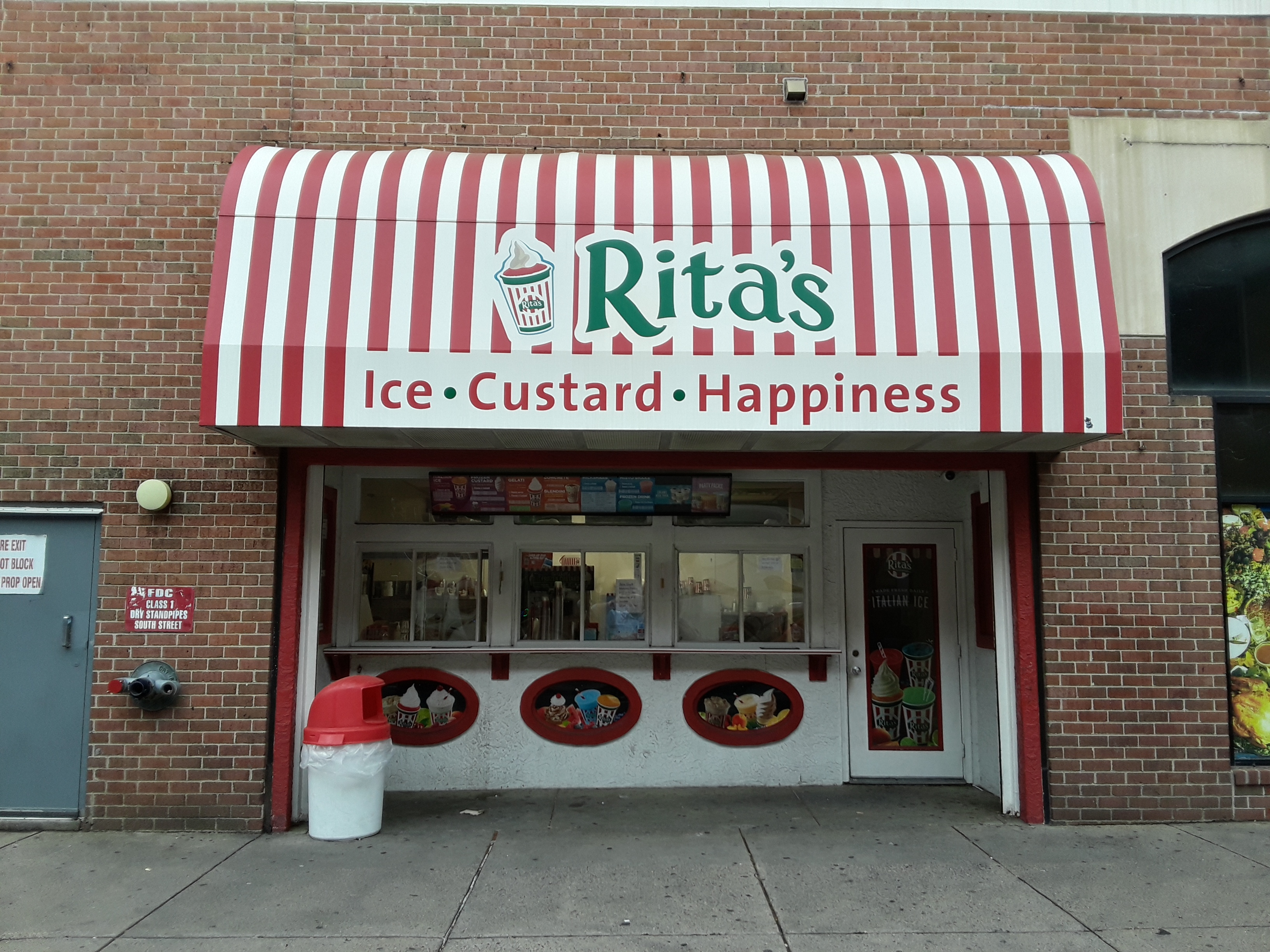
A Rita's outpost in Philadelphia, seen in September 2023

Rita's was founded in May 1984 by former Philadelphia firefighter Bob Tumolo with a recipe that his mother made that he then adjusted to enhance the flavors and include real fruit. Tumolo named the restaurant after his wife, Rita Tumolo. Rita's originally advertised its product as water ice, using the Philadelphia regional term for what is sometimes called Italian ice in other areas of the country. By the summer of 1984 Bob had opened his second store on the opposite side of Pennsylvania, Lake Erie. In 1989 the family decided to franchise their business and expand into other territories.

In May 2005 the company was sold to McKnight Capital Partners, a private equity group with extensive franchise experience. McKnight Capital Partners recognized the organization's growth potential and set into place plans to expand the company.

In April 2007 Rita's moved its Bensalem Township, Pennsylvania headquarters to Trevose, Pennsylvania.

In 2011 Falconhead Capital purchased a controlling interest in the company from an investment group led by Jim Rudolph. Falconhead named their operating partner Thomas Christopoul as the new chairman and interim chief executive.

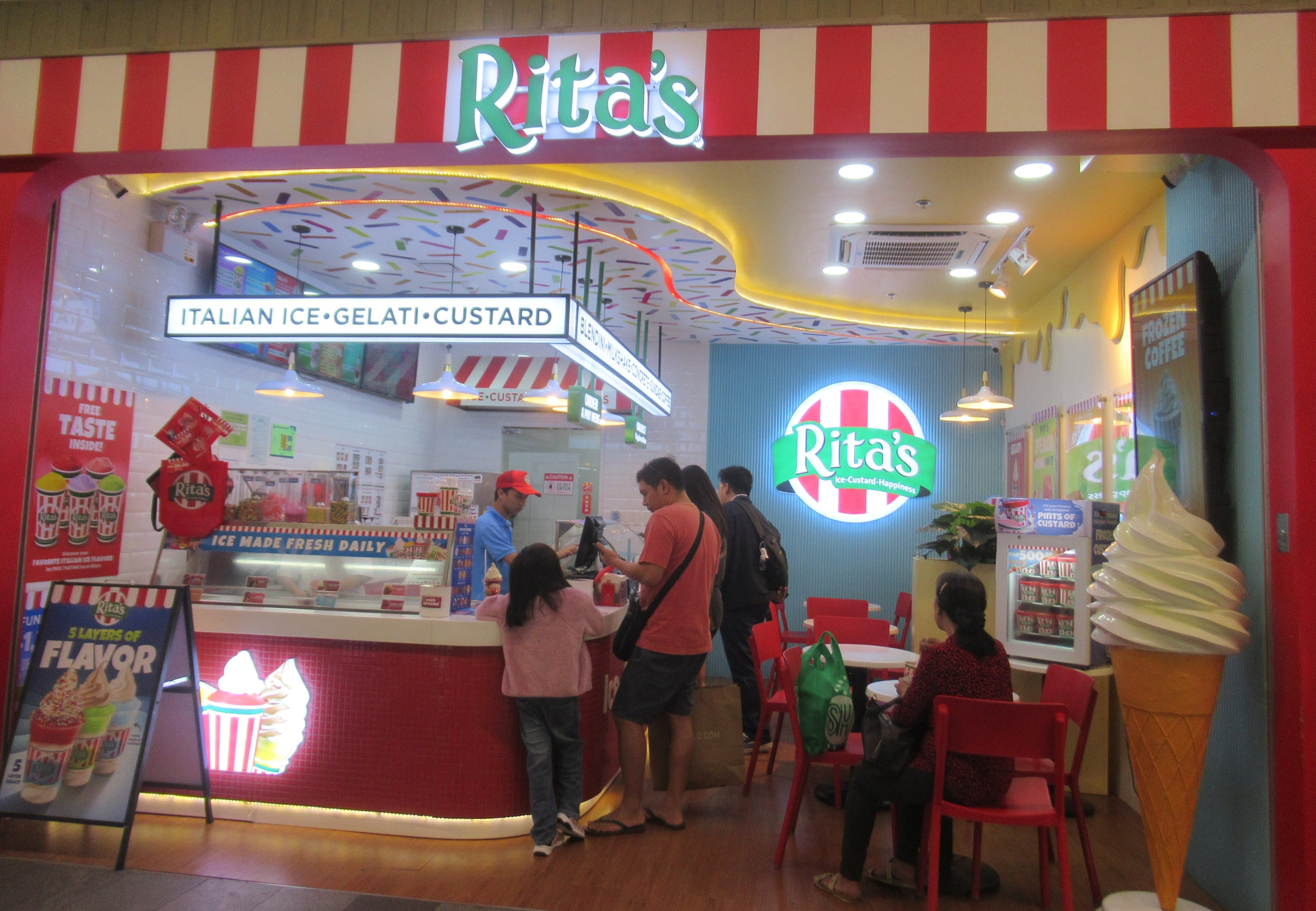
Rita's Water Ice (Philippines)

In 2013, Rita's opened its first location outside of the United States, in Shenzhen, China.

Rita's has traditionally given out a free regular-sized Italian ice, or water ice, on the first day of Spring from 1984 to 2019, and since 2022. Rita's did not host a free water ice day on the first day of Spring in 2020–21, due to the COVID-19 pandemic.

In January 2017 Argosy Private Equity and MTN Capital acquired controlling stake in Rita's from Falconhead Capital.

In January 2022, an episode of Undercover Boss aired featuring CEO and President Linda Chadwich.

In June 2025 a Florida-based franchisee of Rita's Italian Ice filed for Chapter 11 bankruptcy, citing debts up to $1 million.

In July 2025 another franchisee, Armellino Italian Ices Corp., operating a Rita's Italian Ice franchise in Tuscaloosa, Alabama, also filed for Chapter 11 bankruptcy to reorganize its business operations.

Despite these franchisee difficulties, the corporate entity and the brand as a whole maintained a positive trajectory. In August 2025 Rita's Italian Ice & Frozen Custard announced significant mid-year momentum, confirming plans to open nearly 40 new locations throughout 2025. The company stated it was well-positioned for a strong finish to the year.

The brand also continued its promotional and product innovation efforts through the summer of 2025, introducing new seasonal offerings, such as the Rocket Pop Italian Ice and the return of its popular Gummy Bear Italian Ice flavor.

== Partnerships ==
In 2010, Rita's Italian Ice began a partnership with Just Born to offer a seasonal Peeps Brand Marshmallow Candy flavored ice. The Peeps flavor was discontinued in 2011, but was offered in some stores in spring 2017.

Rita's partnered with Cadbury in July 2009 to introduce its Swedish Fish Italian ice flavor. On June 29, 2012, Rita's partnered with Cadbury again to release its Sour Patch Kids Red water ice flavor.

Other companies involved in Rita's water ice flavors include Alex's Lemonade Stand ("Alex's Lemonade" water ice) and Nabisco ("Oreo Cookies and Cream" cream ice and "Mint Oreo" cream ice).

== See also ==
- List of frozen custard companies
