= Schoep's Ice Cream =

American ice cream brand

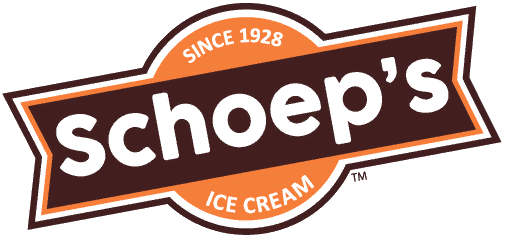
- Type: Private
- Founded: 1928; 98 years ago
- Headquarters: 2070 Helena Street, Madison, Wisconsin 53704
- Products: Ice Cream
- Revenue: $60 Million (as of 2016)
- Number of employees: 150
- Website: schoepsicecream.com

Schoep's Ice Cream is an ice cream manufacturing company based in Madison, Wisconsin. It is the largest independent ice cream manufacturer in Wisconsin.

== History ==
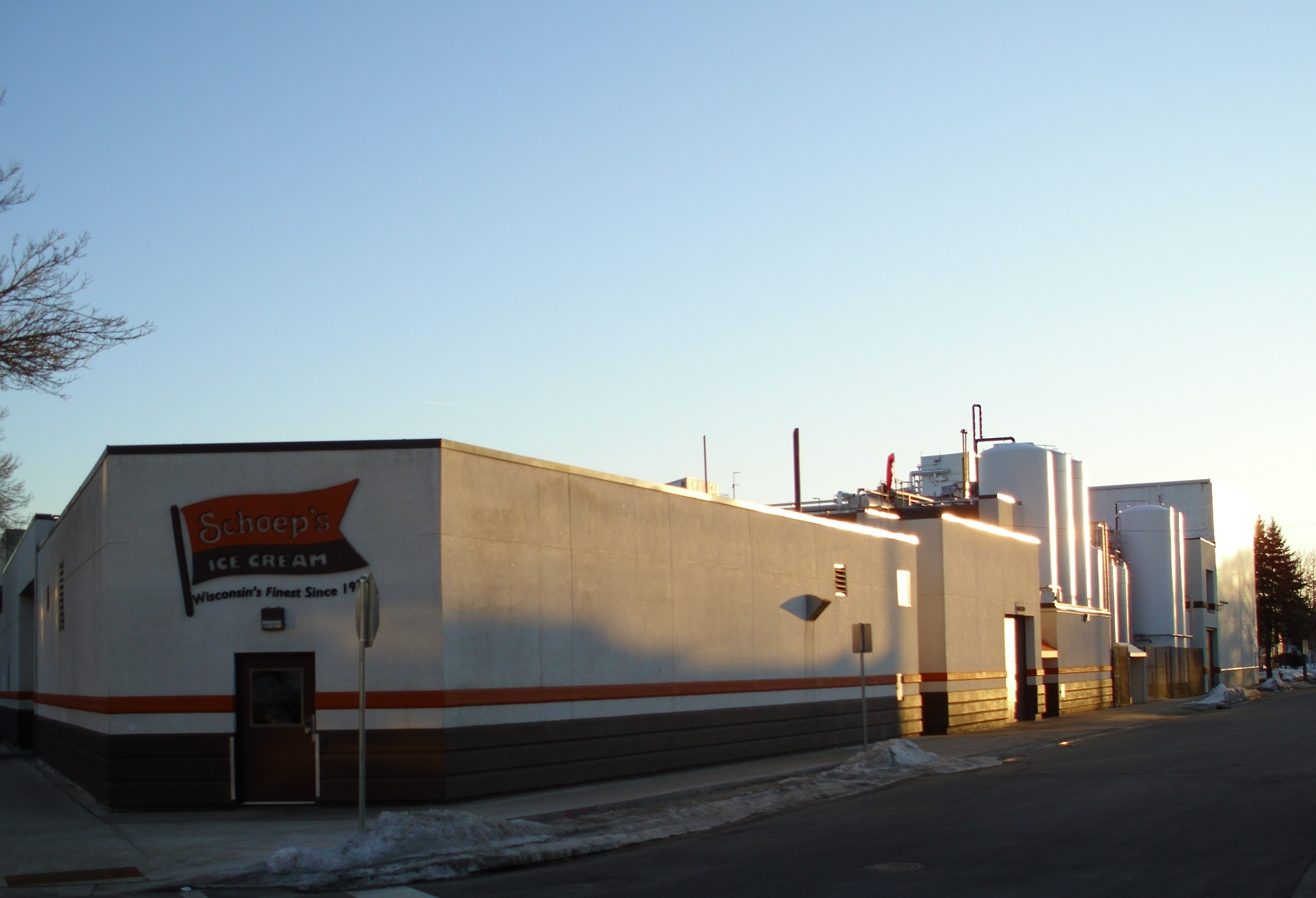
The factory located on Division Street in Madison, Wisconsin

Schoep's Ice Cream was founded by E.J. Schoephoester in 1928. Schoephoester made and sold the ice cream in his grocery store. By 1937 Schoep's Ice Cream had grown in local popularity, and E.B. Schoephoester sold his company in 1940 to Peter B. Thomsen, a butter maker. The company has been kept in the Thomsen family, and as of 2008, it was owned in part by nineteen members of the Thomsen family. As of 2018, four third-generation Thomsens work at the Madison headquarters. Third-generation management includes Alan Thomsen, CEO; Eric Thomsen, VP of innovation and technology; Richard Thomsen, operations manager; and John Thomsen, food service sales and special events.

=== Receivership ===
On October 14, 2019, Schoep's Ice Cream announced that the company had filed for receivership. Schoep's was sold to California-based company Brothers International Desserts on February 27, 2020.

== Operation ==
All of Schoep's Ice Cream is currently produced from a single factory located on Division Street in Madison, Wisconsin. By 2008, Schoeps was producing 6,000 gallons of ice cream an hour and 2.5 million gallons a year. With this high production rate, Schoeps has been recognized as the top producer of ice cream in the state of Wisconsin. Its growth led it, in 2005, Schoep's to open a $7 million, 46,000-square-foot (4,300 m^{2}) distribution center on Manufacturers Drive, near the Dane County Regional Airport. This new facility featured space for 3,600 pallets and 14 loading-dock doors. Before this facility was built, Schoeps had shipped all of their ice cream from two loading docks at their factory.

In 2016, Schoep's produced 10 million gallons of ice cream, and topped $60 million in sales, shipping its product to all 50 states and Puerto Rico. In 2017, Schoep's made more than 12 million gallons of ice cream. Schoep's also makes frozen yogurt, frozen custard, lite ice cream, sherbert, and ice cream novelties.

== Contracts ==
=== Walgreens ===
Schoep's Ice Cream under the Schoep's brand is not generally distributed outside of the Midwest United States, but instead as Walgreens brand Ice Cream and other private pack names. Since 1993, Schoep's has been the sole producer of ice cream sold under the Walgreens label. This contract accounts for more than 25 percent of Schoep's business.

=== Other ===
Schoep's is a licensed manufacturer and distributor of ice cream novelties such as Eskimo Pie, Popsicle, Heath and Nestlé Crunch Ice Cream Bars. Currently, the supermarket version of Gilles Frozen Custard is manufactured and distributed by Schoep's.

== See also ==
- Gilles Frozen Custard
