= Andy's Frozen Custard =

Frozen custard chain

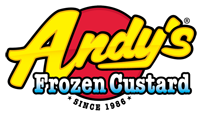

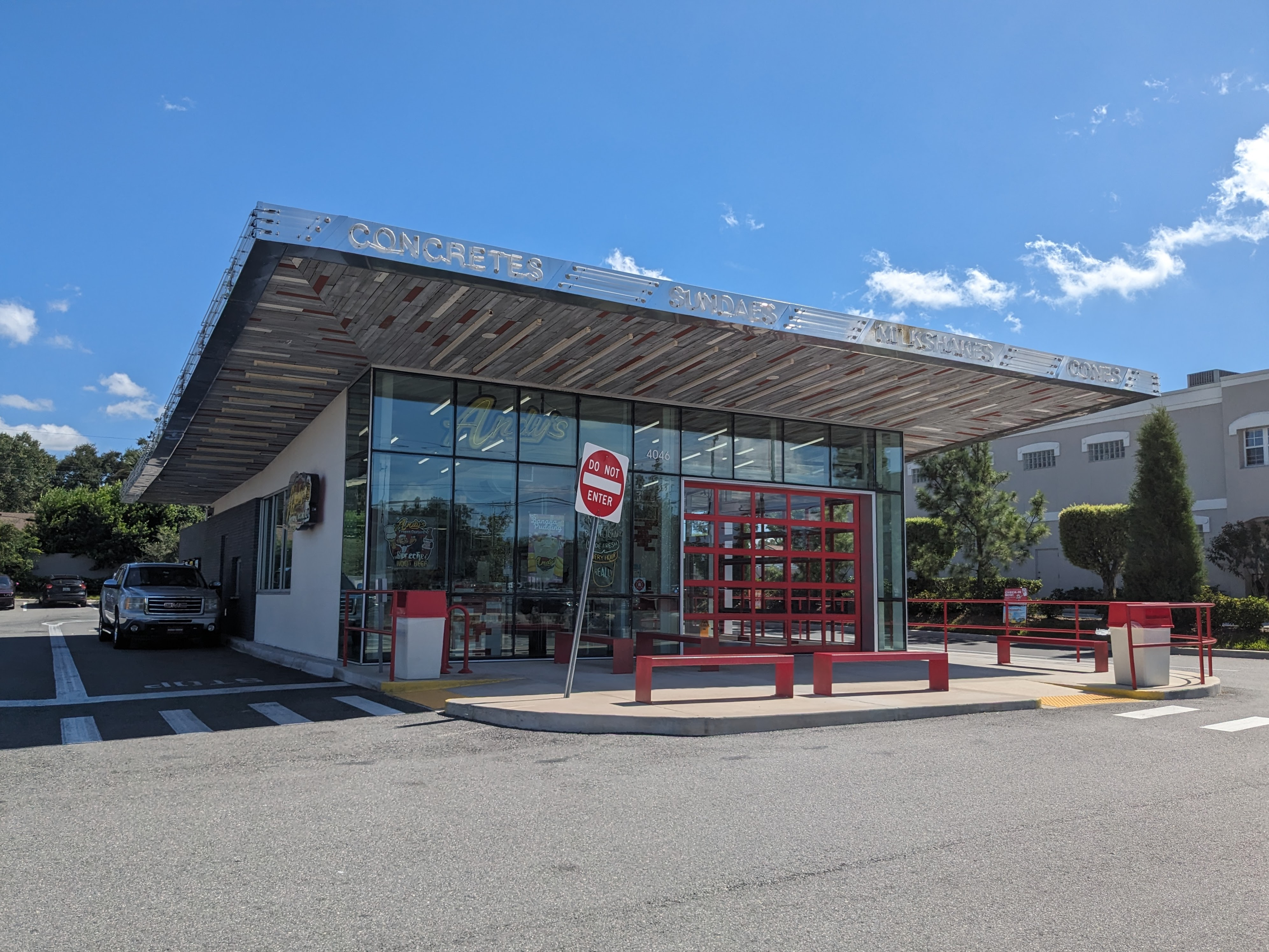
- Andy's Frozen Custard in Lakeland, Florida (2023)
- Type: Private
- Industry: Restaurants; Franchising
- Genre: Quick Service
- Founded: March 19, 1986; 40 years ago in Osage Beach, Missouri, United States
- Founders: John Kuntz; Carol Kuntz
- Headquarters: Springfield, Missouri, United States
- Number of locations: 192 (2026)
- Area served: 15 U.S. states
- Key people: Andy Kuntz (CEO)
- Products: Frozen custard
- Revenue: US$124.39 million (US, 2020)
- Owner: Kuntz family
- Website: eatandys.com

Andy's Frozen Custard is the largest frozen custard-only chain in the United States, with more than 189 company-owned and franchised stores across 15 states.

The company is headquartered in Springfield, Missouri, where the company is run by its namesake, Andy Kuntz. The company specializes in frozen custard-based desserts. In 2009, readers of 417 Magazine voted Andy's as the best thing about area code 417.

== History ==
Andy's was founded by John and Carol Kuntz in 1986 in Osage Beach, Missouri, after the couple first tasted frozen custard in Wisconsin. They sought the mentorship of Leon and Doris Schneider, who had owned Leon's Frozen Custard in Milwaukee since 1942; Leon provided much of the knowledge and guidance the Kuntzes needed to open their own store. The shop was named after their son Andy.

Soon after, the operation expanded to Springfield, Missouri, where Andy, with his wife Dana, learned the frozen custard business. In 2008, John died, and Andy, Dana, and Carol continue to run the business.

Andy and his wife Dana maintain a second residence in Kansas City, Missouri, where the chain now has 13 stores. Andy grew up in the Kansas City suburb of Raytown, Missouri, before moving with his parents to the Ozarks at age 14.

== Locations ==
As of May 2026, Andy's has 192 locations in fifteen states: Arizona, Arkansas, Colorado, Florida, Georgia, Illinois, Kansas, Kentucky, Louisiana, Missouri, North Carolina, Oklahoma, South Carolina, Tennessee, and Texas. More locations are currently planned and coming soon. Currently, they have franchise development agreements in place for Phoenix, Arizona, as well as parts of North Carolina and Florida.

In 2012, Andy's announced the flavor of the Boomer Bear Concrete, a dessert created to support Missouri State University's athletics program and named after the school's mascot. It is available in Andy's Springfield, Missouri, locations.

In 2015, Andy's signed a multi-franchise agreement and the largest in its 29-year history. This will result in 20 new stores found in Tulsa and Oklahoma City, Oklahoma; Dallas, Texas; Nashville, Tennessee, and various markets in Central Florida.

In 2023, Andy's signed a 6 store franchise agreement with 3 Peaks Custard serving the East Tennessee market, with the first store opening in Sevierville in 2024.

== See also ==
- List of frozen custard companies
