= List of frozen custard companies =

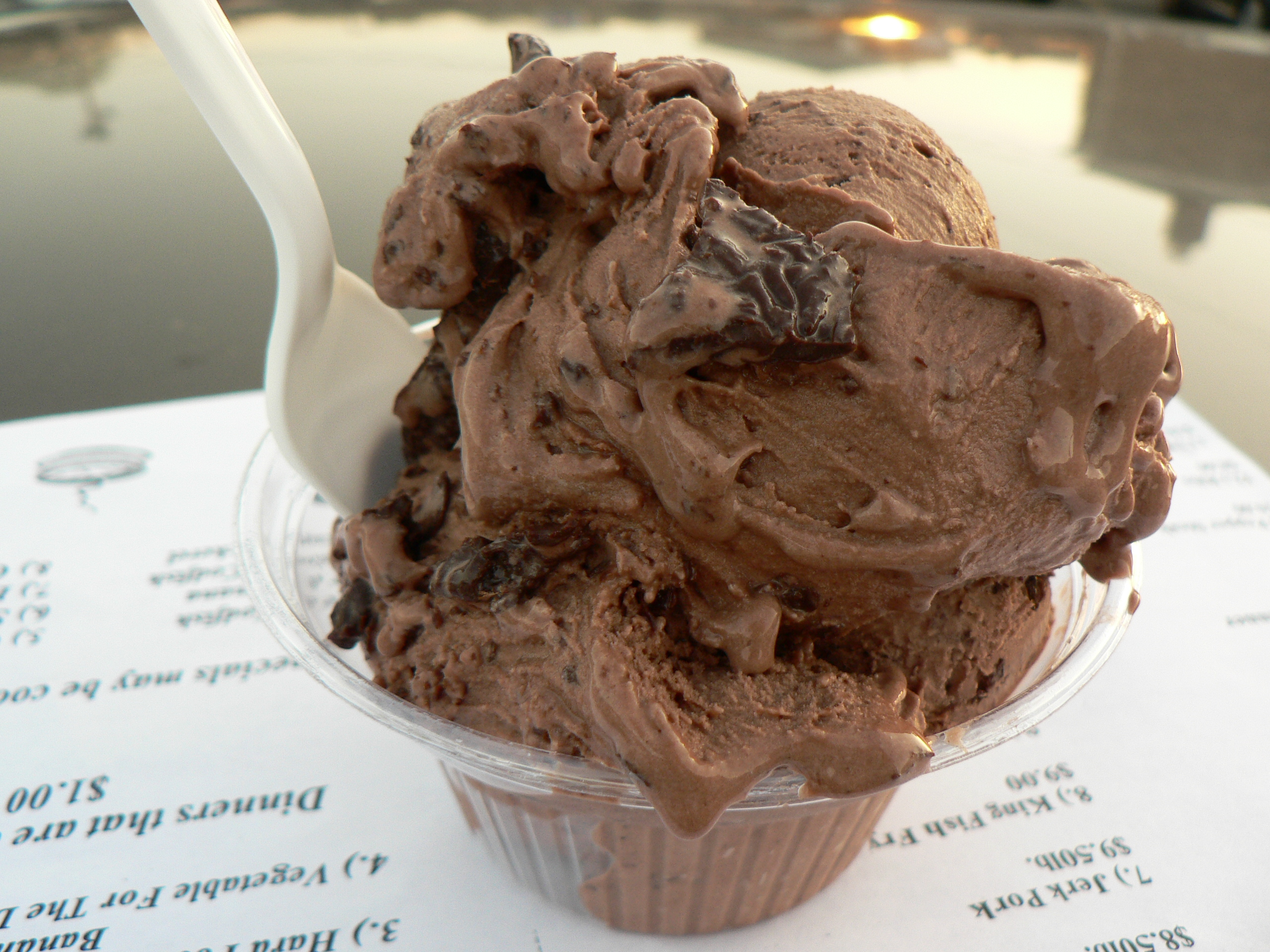
Chocolate frozen custard

This is a list of notable frozen custard companies that manufacture or purvey frozen custard. Frozen custard is a cold dessert similar to ice cream, but includes a significant amount of eggs, and typically has a denser consistency.

== Frozen custard companies ==
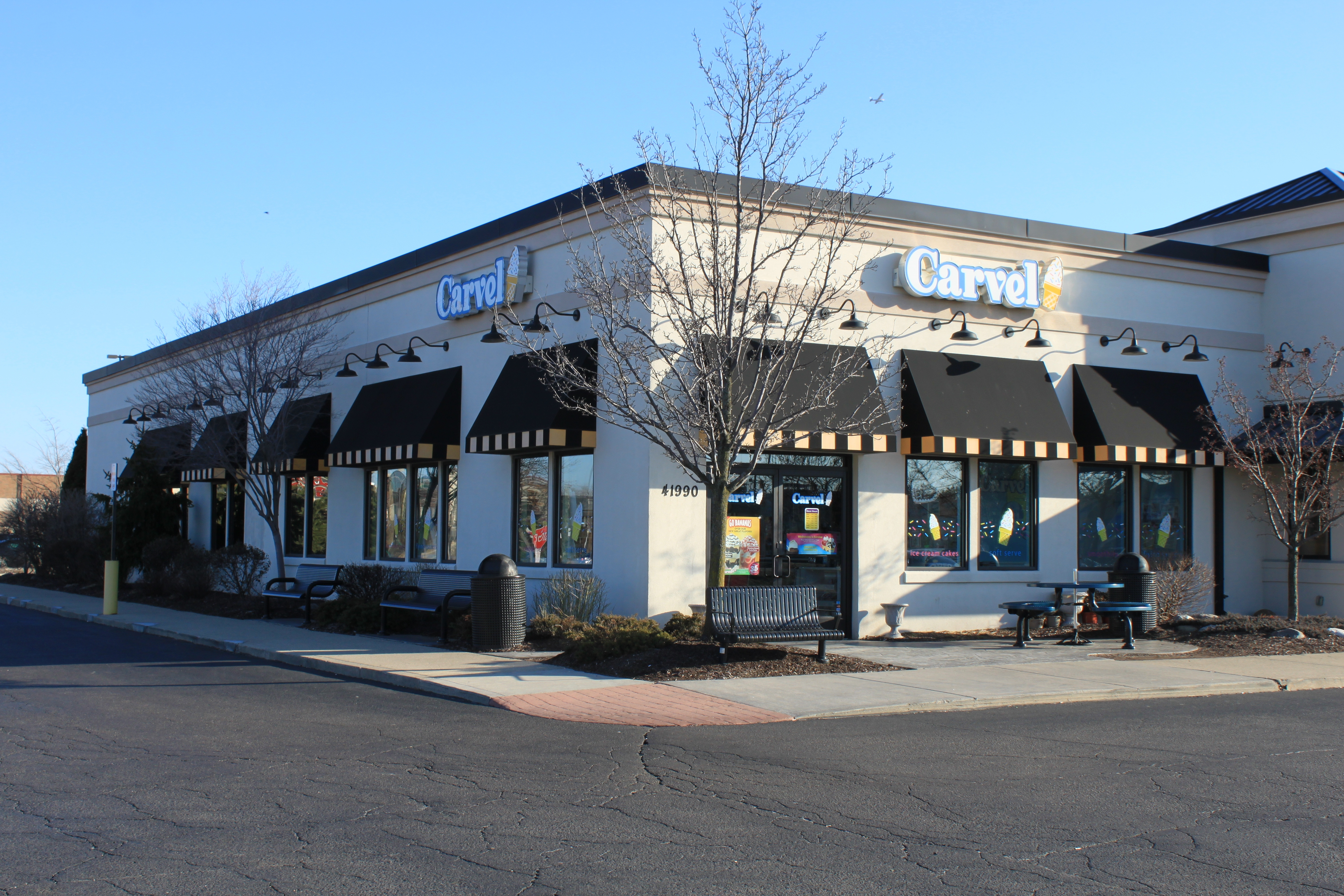
A Carvel franchise store in Canton, Michigan, 2012

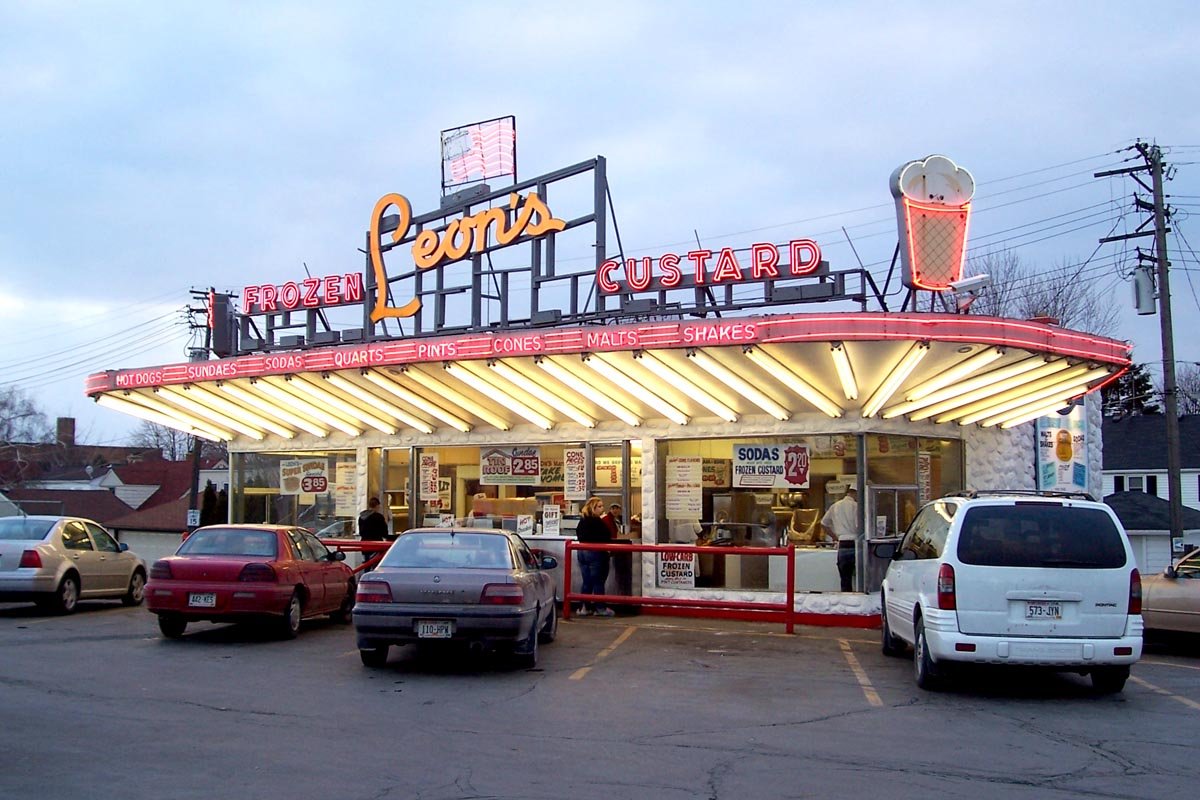
Leon's Frozen Custard in Milwaukee, Wisconsin, 2006

- Abbott's Frozen Custard – a franchise founded and based in Rochester, New York
- Andy's Frozen Custard – a restaurant chain with locations in fourteen U.S. states, based in Springfield, Missouri
- Carvel – an ice cream franchise owned by Focus Brands, founded in Hartsdale, New York
- Culver's – a casual fast food restaurant chain that operates primarily in the Midwestern United States, based in Prairie du Sac, Wisconsin
- Freddy's Frozen Custard & Steakburgers – an American fast-casual restaurant chain based in Wichita, Kansas.
- Gilles Frozen Custard – a brand of frozen custard that originated at the Gilles Frozen Custard Stand established in 1938; the oldest frozen custard stand in Milwaukee, Wisconsin
- Good Times Burgers & Frozen Custard – chain based in Golden, Colorado with locations in Colorado and Wyoming
- Goodberry's Frozen Custard - a chain based in Raleigh, North Carolina with locations in North Carolina and Australia.
- Kohr's Frozen Custard -- considered the originator of Frozen Custard. The original family currently runs locations on the New Jersey shore.
- Kopp's Frozen Custard – a restaurant chain located in the Milwaukee, Wisconsin area that specializes in frozen custard and large "jumbo" hamburgers
- Leon's Frozen Custard – a family-owned drive-in established in 1942 and located in Milwaukee, Wisconsin
- Meadows Frozen Custard – franchise based in Duncansville, Pennsylvania, most locations in the Mid-Atlantic United States, with one location in Canberra, Australia
- Rita's Italian Ice – Italian ice chain located in the Mid-Atlantic United States which also serves frozen custard, based in Bucks County, Pennsylvania
- Shake Shack – an American fast casual restaurant chain based in New York City
- Shake's Frozen Custard – franchise founded in Joplin, Missouri and based in Fayetteville, Arkansas
- Ted Drewes – a family-owned frozen custard company in St. Louis, Missouri
- Tom Wahl's – several locations near Rochester, New York
- Whit's Frozen Custard - a chain founded in Granville, Ohio in March 2003, with locations in 10 different states
- Zesto Drive-In – sublicensed trademark used by several U.S. restaurants and franchises, founded in Jefferson City, Missouri

== See also ==
- Lists of companies
- List of dairy product companies in the United States
