= Meadows Frozen Custard =

American dessert restaurant franchise

The Meadows Frozen Custard
- Type: Private
- Industry: Franchising
- Founded: July 4, 1950; 76 years ago
- Founder: Delbert Meadows
- Headquarters: Duncansville, Pennsylvania
- Number of locations: 27 (2024)
- Area served: Pennsylvania, Maryland, Virginia, North Carolina, Texas, Georgia
- Products: Frozen custard, milkshakes, Italian ice, smoothies
- Owner: Todd Gelbaugh
- Website: meadowsfrozencustard.com

The Meadows Frozen Custard is a franchise founded on July 4, 1950, that specializes in frozen custard.

== History ==
Delbert Meadows opened a small custard stand in Duncansville, Pennsylvania. After decades of business, the Meadows brothers decided to add batting cages, mini golf, and go-karts to their location. Now considered a landmark in western Pennsylvania, the Duncansville location is still in operation and owned by Dick, Jay and Joel Meadows, sons of Delbert Meadows.

The Original Meadows Frozen Custard stand located in Duncansville, PA.

== Original Frozen Custard ==
The frozen custard is an original recipe that has been in the Meadows family for decades. On July 4, 1950, the Meadows brothers, J.V., Richard and Delbert, worked with Rush A. Turner, mix-master and ice cream department supervisor, of Sealtest located in Altoona, Pennsylvania to come up with a unique frozen custard recipe that is still used today. When Seal-Test dairy went out of business the recipe was then transferred to Galliker's Dairy who is now in charge of the production. The Meadows menu includes shakes, sundaes, arctic swirls, banana splits, root beer floats, strawberry shortcakes, smoothies, and cones.

== Current ==
In 2003, the Meadows brothers (Dick, Jay, and Joe) sold the Meadows franchise to Gardner Meadows Inc. Since the purchase of the Meadows franchise, Gardner Meadows Inc. has opened 12 franchises and have 9 in current development. These franchises are located across Pennsylvania and Maryland. Demand has caused more franchises to form, each individually owned and operated. Over fifty years later each Meadows location still serves the same recipe that got its start in 1950. Locations include: Bedford, Pennsylvania, Bethlehem, Pennsylvania, Carlisle, Pennsylvania, Chambersburg, Pennsylvania, Clarion, Pennsylvania, Clearfield, Pennsylvania, Columbia, Maryland, Cranberry Township, Pennsylvania, DuBois, Pennsylvania, Ebensburg, Pennsylvania, Enola, Pennsylvania, Frederick, Maryland, Greensburg, Pennsylvania, Greenwood (Altoona), Pennsylvania, Hagerstown, Maryland, Harrisburg, Pennsylvania, Hollidaysburg (Duncansville), Pennsylvania, Huntingdon, Pennsylvania, Indiana, Pennsylvania, Johnstown, Pennsylvania, Monroeville, Pennsylvania, Oak Ridge, North Carolina, Waynesboro, Pennsylvania, York, Pennsylvania, Ashburn, Virginia, Williamsburg, Virginia.The original location in Hollidaysburg is currently being rebuilt, opening April 18, 2014.

Australia's first store opened in Franklin (Canberra) in 2016.

In 2008, Travel Channel program "Taste of America" visited the Meadows to film a segment on the frozen custard stand. The episode was broadcast Wednesday, May 7, 2008, at 11:00 p.m. EST on The Travel Channel. Show host Mark DeCarlo and crew visited The Meadows to get a taste of The Meadows' frozen custard. DeCarlo visited with the Meadows family and many of the firm's customers. DeCarlo and his crew also got an inside peek into the manufacturing of the product, product preparation, and customer service.

== See also ==
- List of frozen custard companies
