= Ted Drewes =

American frozen custard company

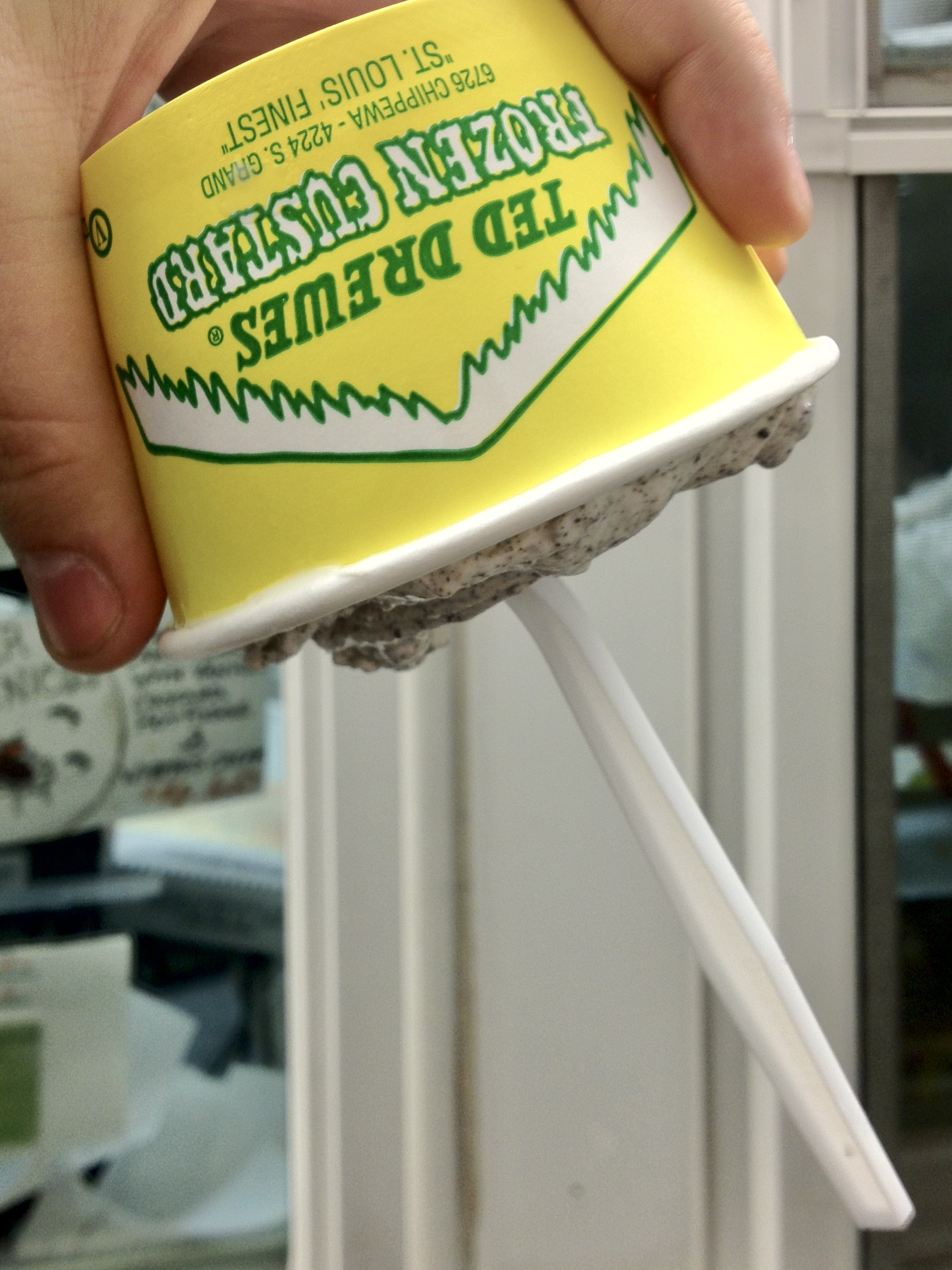
- A Ted Drewes frozen custard concrete, turned upside-down
- Founded: 1930; 96 years ago in St. Louis, Missouri
- Founder: Ted Drewes, Sr.
- Number of locations: 2
- Area served: St. Louis, Missouri
- Number of employees: 65 (2018)
- Website: teddrewes.com

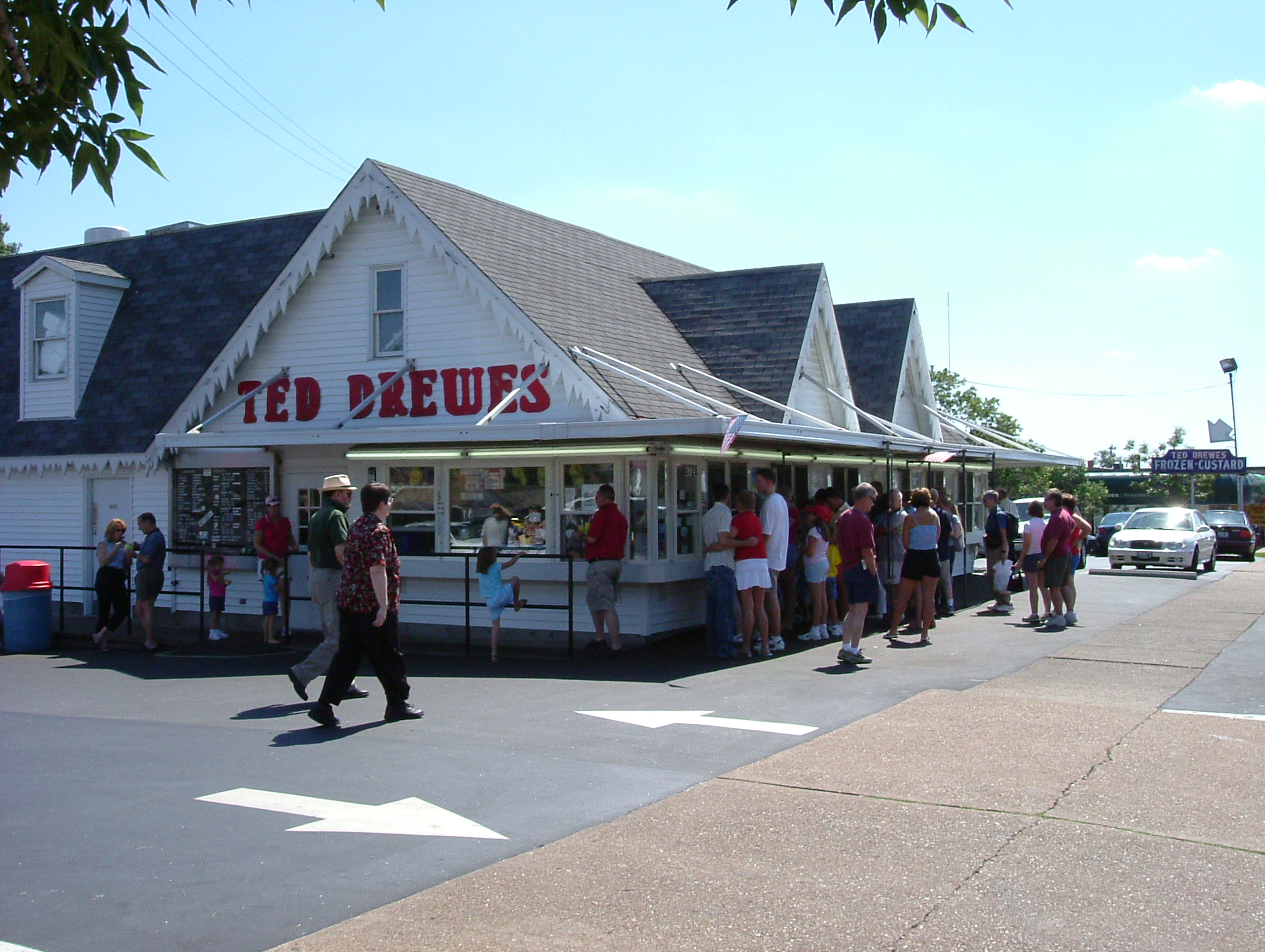
Ted Drewes Frozen Custard in St. Louis, Missouri, Route 66 location

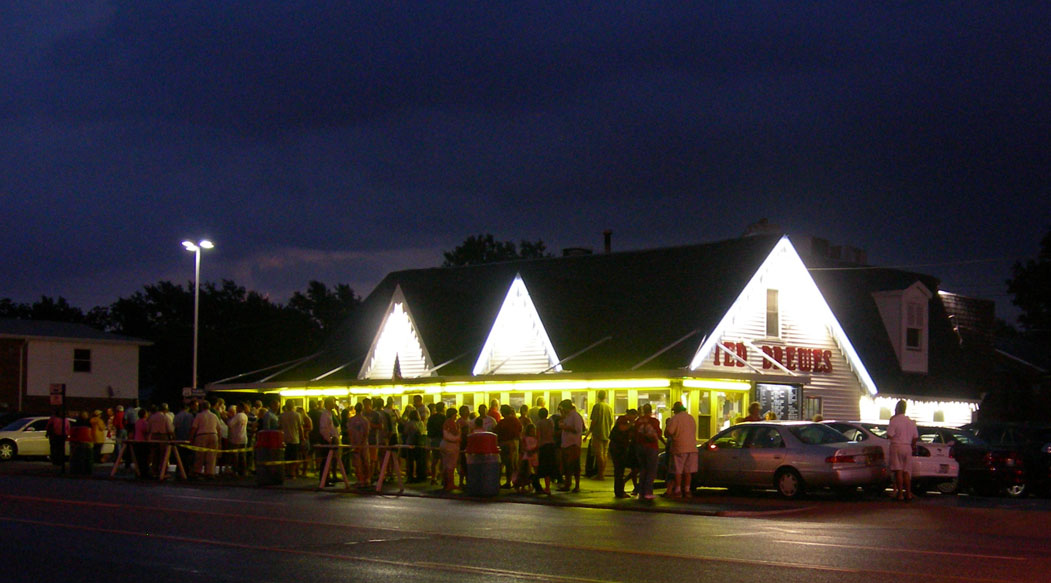
Another view of the Route 66 location that illustrates the crowd typically found on a summer evening

Ted Drewes is a family-owned frozen custard company in St. Louis, Missouri, founded by Ted Drewes, Sr. in 1929. There are two locations, one on Chippewa Street (part of U.S. Route 66), with the other on South Grand Boulevard.

Its signature item is the "concrete", a serving of frozen custard so thick that it is customarily presented to the customer upside down.

== History ==
A noted local athlete who starred for his high school basketball team and later dominated municipal tennis tournaments for more than a decade, Ted Drewes started making frozen custard while working for a carnival and opened his first fixed location near St. Petersburg, Florida, in 1929. The first St. Louis shop began serving in 1930 on Natural Bridge Avenue near Goodfellow Blvd. Less than a year later, it was moved westward along the avenue. A second location was opened at 4224 South Grand Blvd. in 1931. In 1941, a third location opened at 6726 Chippewa Street, on one of the alignments of U.S. Route 66 through St. Louis. The Natural Bridge and Florida locations had closed by 1958, but the Chippewa and South Grand locations remain open. When Ted Drewes, Sr. died in 1968, the St. Louis Post-Dispatch noted his passing in an obituary that focused on his tennis.

For decades, the Grand Avenue location was the flagship store, serving what was then a densely populated urban area in the neighborhood of Dutchtown and near the neighborhoods of Tower Grove South, Gravois Park, Bevo Mill, Holly Hills, and Carondelet. Each year, it would open in April and close on October 31. The Chippewa location served as an outpost near the city limits for travelers heading to or returning from an Ozark weekend getaway. In those days, it was open from Memorial Day to Labor Day.

Between the population shifting west in the city and Route 66 drawing more crowds, the Chippewa store became the flagship location. Its season extended to more of the year, while the shop on Grand shortened its seasonal operation. In the weeks leading up to Christmas, Ted Drewes began selling live Christmas trees. In the wake of the transition, the Chippewa store expanded its building and bought a neighboring property to accommodate parking. By 2006, the company was making more than 150,000 gallons of custard every year.

The Chippewa store is closed only during the month of January. In 2013, it closed briefly after a minor electrical fire. The South Grand location now operates only seasonally during summer months.

In 2013, Ted Drewes Jr. said he has declined numerous requests to franchise nationally.

Due to effects from the COVID-19 pandemic, the South Grand location closed temporarily prior to the summer of 2020. It reopened for the summer of 2023.

On August 26, 2024, Ted Drewes Jr. died at the age of 96.

== In the press ==
Ted Drewes' shops and frozen custard have drawn the attention of The New York Times several times over the years, including in 1986, 1997, and 1999. In 2004, reporter R.W. Apple Jr. extolled the custard in an article on Midwestern sweets.

In 1986, The New York Times revealed that the origin of the Blizzard from Dairy Queen was an attempt by a franchisee to mimic the Ted Drewes concrete.

In 2006, Alton Brown featured the Route 66 location on the Food Network show Feasting on Asphalt.

In 2010, Bobby Flay recommended Ted Drewes on the "Sweet Tooth" episode of The Best Thing I Ever Ate.

In 2011, Ted Drewes was featured in a "Route 66" episode of Man v. Food Nation, hosted by Adam Richman.

In 2014, the Riverfront Times 2014 award for "Best Frozen Custard in St. Louis" went to Ted Drewes.

In 2017, Ted Drewes was named "Best Ice Cream Shop in the World" by SoolNua, an Irish marketing firm that publishes a world ice cream index every year.

In 2024, Ted Drewes was featured in History Channel's The Food That Built America. During the episode entitled "Ice Cream Revolution", it is stated that the concept of the Blizzard from Dairy Queen was copied from the Ted Drewes concrete.

== See also ==
- List of frozen custard companies
