= Gilles Frozen Custard =

Frozen custard brand

Gilles Frozen Custard Stand Logo

Gilles Frozen Custard (/ˈɡɪləs/, commonly pronounced as /ˈɡɪliːz/) is a brand of frozen custard that originated at the Gilles Frozen Custard Stand, the oldest frozen custard stand in Milwaukee, Wisconsin (and one of the first in the country), dating back to 1938. The company and custard stand (still at its original location) was founded by Paul Gilles.

In 1972, after selling limited quantities of the custard at a local supermarket, Paul Gilles sold the rights to manufacture and distribute the custard to an outside company. Thus, Gilles Frozen Custard can be found pre-packaged in supermarkets throughout the Midwest; however, because of the differences in the manufacturing process, the frozen custard sold in stores deviates from Gilles's original recipe, which is still used at the custard stand. The naming rights to the pre-packaged custard have changed hands several times since 1972; currently, the supermarket version of Gilles is manufactured and distributed by Schoep's Ice Cream of Madison, Wisconsin.

== See also ==
- List of frozen custard companies
