= Leon's Frozen Custard =

Coordinates: 42°59′16″N 87°56′55″W

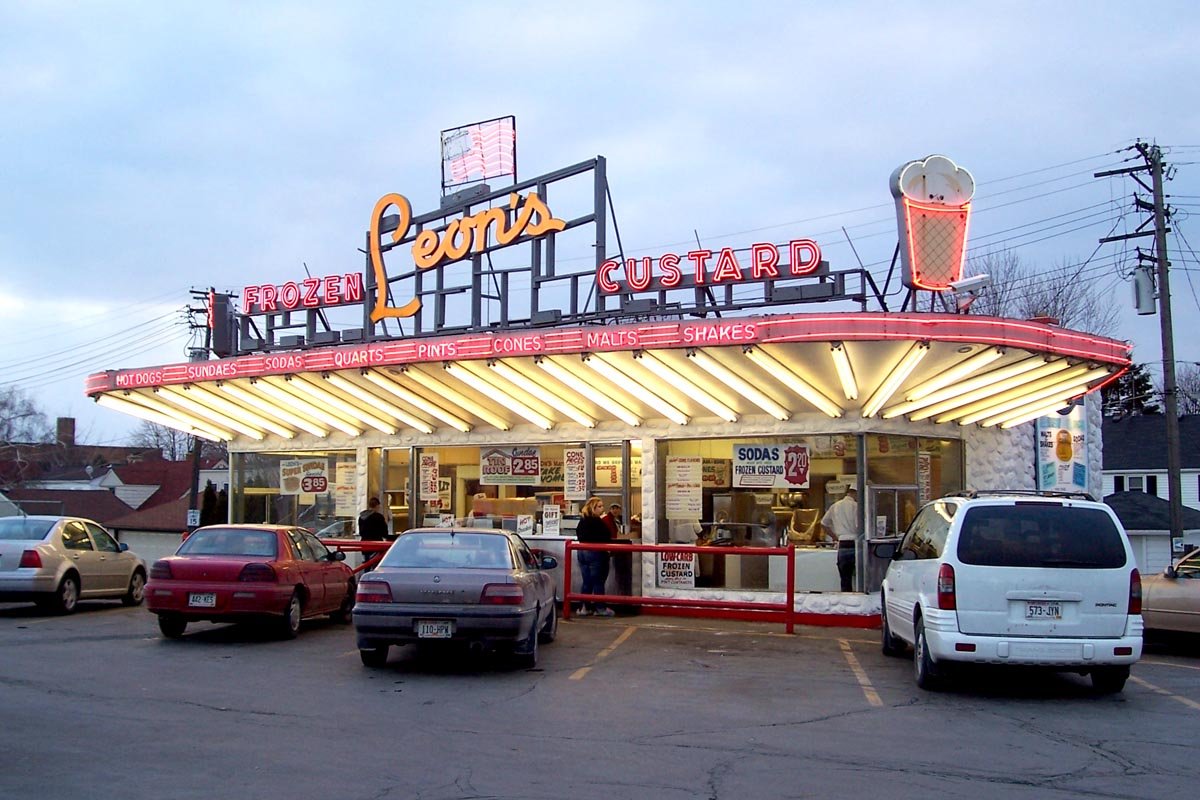
- Interactive map of Leon's Frozen Custard

Restaurant information
- Established: 1942; 84 years ago
- Food type: Frozen custard
- Dress code: Casual
- Location: Milwaukee, Wisconsin, United States
- Website: leonsfrozencustardmke.com

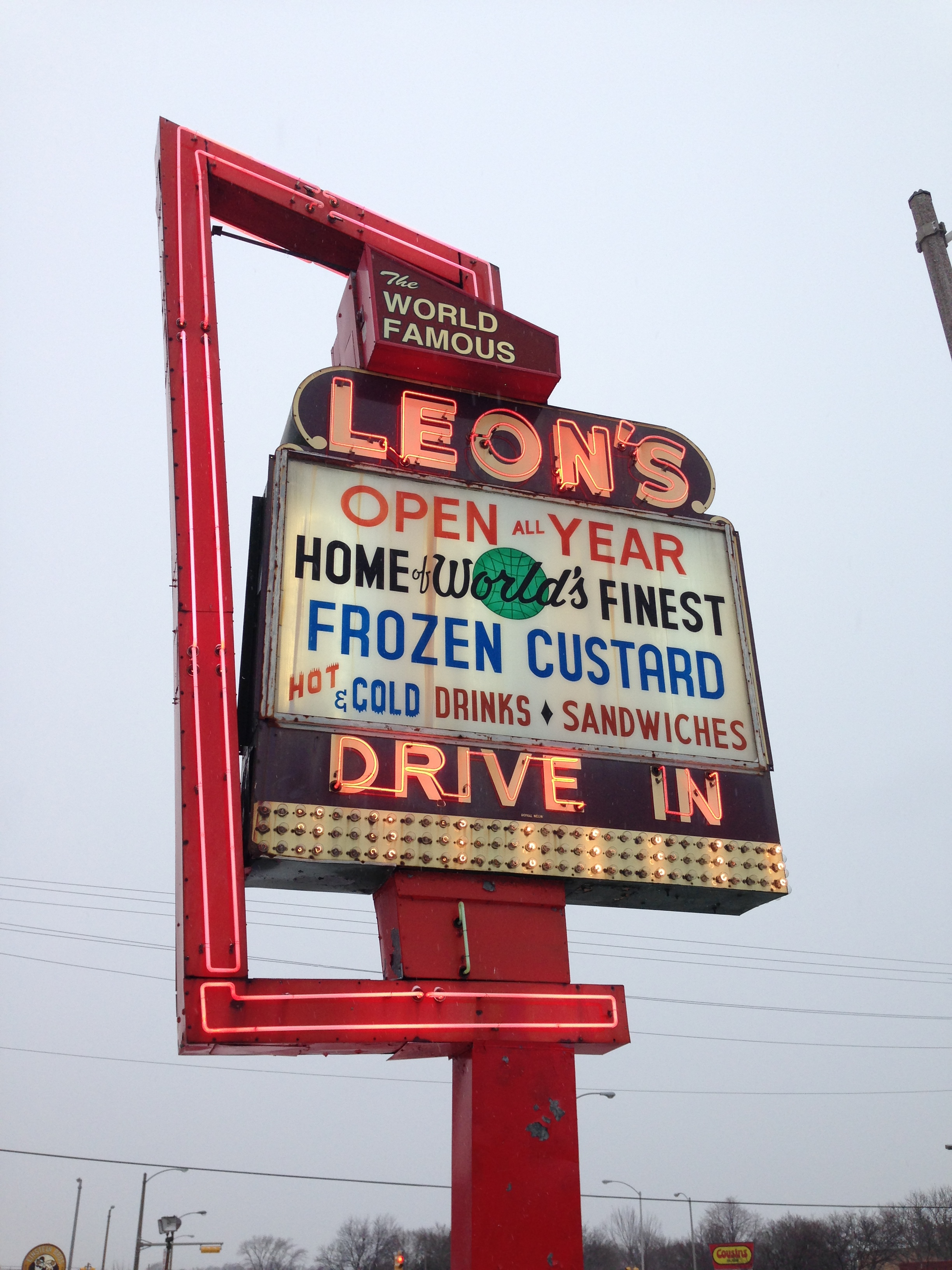
Leon's Frozen Custard sign

Leon's Frozen Custard is a family-owned drive-in restaurant specializing in frozen custard, located in Milwaukee, Wisconsin. Opened in 1942, its current appearance as a "drive-in restaurant" comes from an early 1950s remodel.

Leon's Frozen Custard claims to be the "Home of the World's Finest Frozen Custard," as noted boldly on its signage. Leon's offers the three "regular" flavors of vanilla and chocolate and butter pecan. Butter pecan was added on a regular basis because it was so popular. On weekends, Leon's adds a fourth flavor.

== See also ==
- List of frozen custard companies
