= Frozen custard =

Frozen dessert

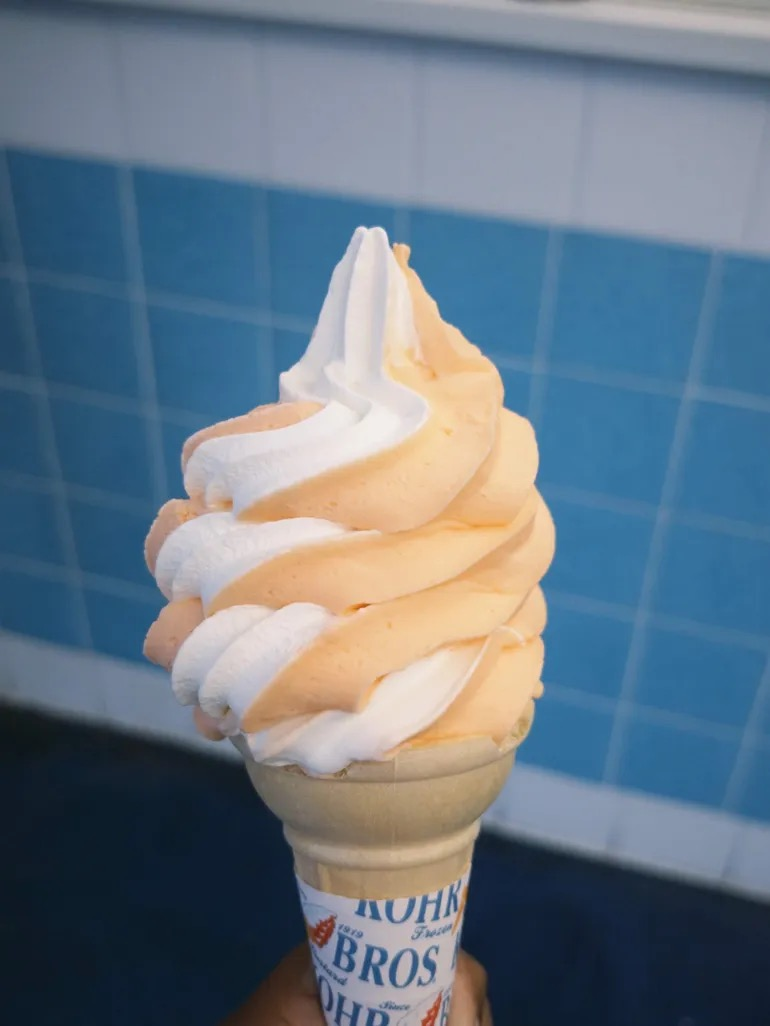
- Creamsicle flavored frozen custard
- Type: Frozen dessert
- Main ingredients: Egg yolks, cream, sweetener

Frozen custard is a frozen dessert that is a type of ice cream made with egg yolks in addition to cream and sweetener (either sugar or an alternative), and an additional flavoring such as cocoa, vanilla, or fruit such as strawberries or peaches. It is usually kept at a warmer temperature compared to ice cream, and typically has a denser and thicker consistency.

== History ==
Egg yolks have been integrated into ice creams since at least the 1690s, though there are several notable invention stories that are associated with modern commercializations of this practice.

One early commercialization of frozen custard was in Coney Island, New York, in 1919, when ice cream vendors Archie and Elton Kohr found that adding egg yolks to ice cream created a smoother texture and helped the ice cream stay cold longer. In their first weekend on the boardwalk, they sold 18,460 cones.

Throughout the 1920s, the popularity of frozen custard spread from Coney Island to traveling carnivals. That is where tennis player Theodore R. Drewes Sr. was introduced to the treat when he began selling it in Florida to earn extra money during the winter off-season, first with the traveling carnival in the 1920s and then at his own custard stand in 1929. He brought the business back to his hometown of St. Louis, Missouri, where he opened Ted Drewes in 1930 and expanded to a second location in 1931 and three stores in that city by 1941. Ted Drewes is often credited as the birthplace of the concrete, which is a thick custard churned with mix-ins. Ted Drewes custard shop in the Dutchtown neighborhood is the oldest frozen custard stand in the world that is still in operation.

A frozen custard stand at the 1933 World's Fair in Chicago introduced the dessert to a wider audience. Following the fair, the dessert's popularity spread throughout the Midwest; Milwaukee, Wisconsin, in particular, became known as the "unofficial frozen custard capital of the world".

Per capita, Milwaukee has the highest concentration of frozen custard shops in the world and the city supports a long-standing four-way competition between Kopp's Frozen Custard, Gilles Frozen Custard, Oscar's Frozen Custard, and Leon's Frozen Custard.

Major frozen custard chains in the United States include Culver's, headquartered in Prairie du Sac, Wisconsin, with outlets in 26 states; Freddy's Frozen Custard & Steakburgers, based in Wichita, Kansas, with more than 300 locations nationwide; and Andy's Frozen Custard, based in Springfield, Missouri, with over 140 locations in 15 states. Other chains serving frozen custard include Ted Drewes (based in Saint Louis, Missouri), Rita's Italian Ice (a suburb of Philadelphia, Pennsylvania), The Meadows, and Abbott's (Rochester, New York).

== Characteristics ==
In the U.S., the Food and Drug Administration requires any product marketed as frozen custard to contain at least 10 percent milkfat and 1.4 percent egg yolk solids. The FDA also allows the names "french ice cream" or "french custard ice cream" to be used. If it has a smaller percentage of egg yolk solids, it is considered ice cream and legally classified as such by the FDA.

Actual frozen custard is a dense dessert. Soft serve ice creams may have an overrun as large as 100%, meaning half of the final product is composed of air. Frozen custard, when made in a continuous freezer, has an overrun of 15–30% depending on the machine manufacturer (an overrun percentage similar to gelato). Air is not pumped into the mix, nor is it added as an "ingredient" but gets into the frozen state by the agitation of liquid similar to whisking a meringue. The high percentage of butterfat and egg yolk gives the frozen custard a thick, creamy texture and a smoother consistency than ice cream. Frozen custard can be served at −8 °C (18 °F), warmer than the −12 °C (10 °F) at which ice cream is served, to make a soft serve product.

Another difference between commercially produced frozen custard and commercial ice cream is the way the custard is frozen. The mix enters a refrigerated tube and, as it freezes, blades scrape the product cream off the barrel walls. The now frozen custard is discharged directly into containers from which it can be served. The speed with which the product leaves the barrel minimizes the amount of air in the product but, more importantly, ensures that the ice crystals formed are small.

== See also ==
- Custard, the basic egg and dairy preparations
- Frozen yogurt, the cultured and frozen milk product
- Gelato, the Italian style of ice cream
- Ice cream
- List of custard desserts
- List of frozen custard companies
- Semifreddo, the partially frozen type of dessert, sometimes a custard mixed with whipped cream
- Soft serve, a soft form of ice cream
