= Ice cream =

Frozen dessert

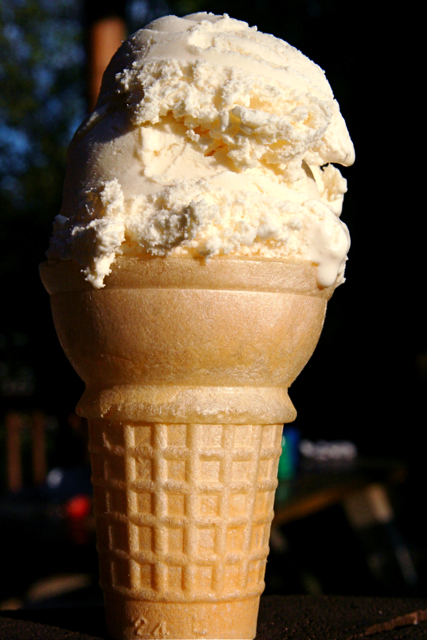
- Vanilla ice cream served on a cone
- Type: Frozen dessert
- Main ingredients: Milk, cream, sweetener, flavouring
- Variations: Gelato, frozen custard, Kulfi, Bastani, Dondurma, Booza

Ice cream is a frozen dessert typically made from milk or cream that has been flavoured with a sweetener, either sugar or an alternative, and a spice, such as cocoa or vanilla, or with fruit, such as strawberries or peaches. Food colouring is sometimes added in addition to stabilizers. The mixture is cooled below the freezing point of water and stirred to incorporate air spaces and prevent detectable ice crystals from forming. It can also be made by whisking a flavoured cream base and liquid nitrogen together. The result is a smooth, semi-solid foam that is solid at very low temperatures (below 2 °C or 35 °F). It becomes more malleable as its temperature increases.

Ice cream may be served in dishes, eaten with a spoon, or licked from edible wafer hand-held ice cream cones as finger food. Ice cream may be served with other desserts such as cake or pie, used as an ingredient in cold dishes such as ice cream floats, sundaes, milkshakes, and ice cream cakes, or in baked items such as Baked Alaska. It is often sold in dedicated ice cream parlors, carts, stands or vans.

The Italian word for ice cream, gelato ("frozen"), is often used in English. Frozen custard is a type of rich ice cream. Soft serve is softer and is often served at amusement parks and fast-food restaurants in the United States. Ice creams made from cow's milk alternatives, such as goat's or sheep's milk, or milk substitutes (e.g., soy, oat, cashew, coconut, almond milk, or tofu), are available for those who are lactose intolerant, allergic to dairy protein, or vegan. Banana "nice cream" (Note: There is also a small-batch ice cream business called Nice Cream.) is a 100% fruit-based vegan alternative. Frozen yoghurt, or "froyo", is similar to ice cream but uses yoghurt, and is usually lower in fat. Fruity sorbets or sherbets without dairy content are usually also sold in ice cream shops.

The legal definition of the name ice cream varies from country to country. In some countries, such as the United States and the United Kingdom, the term ice cream applies only to products meeting a defined specification; most governments regulate the commercial use of the various terms according to the relative quantities of the main ingredients, notably the amount of butterfat from cream. In the UK "dairy ice cream" is more restrictive than "ice cream" alone. Products containing milk or cream that do not meet the criteria to be called ice cream, usually due to being reduced fat (often to reduce cost), are sometimes labelled frozen dairy dessert instead. In some other countries the name of the dessert makes no mention of cream, and is applicable to non-dairy desserts.

== History ==
=== Origins ===
==== Persian, Chinese, and Roman cuisines ====
The origins of frozen desserts are obscure, but several accounts exist about their history. The history of ice cream likely began in ancient Persia around 550 BC, and Persian engineering techniques for storing and using ice led to the creation of the forerunner of all frozen desserts. A Roman cookbook dating back to the 1st century includes recipes for sweet desserts sprinkled with snow, and there are Persian records from the 2nd century for sweetened drinks chilled with ice.

In his poem Zhao Hun (Summoning of the Soul), Qu Yuan, a poet from the late Warring States period of China, recorded frozen treats(Or iced drinks).

Sushan depicted in the murals of Crown Prince Zhanghuai's tomb from the Tang dynasty

The Tang dynasty work Youyang Zazu records methods for making cold drinks. These include liquid-based laoyin (fermented milk drinks) and tanglao (sweetened fermented milk), with the former consumed as a beverage and the latter used as a condiment for fruit rather than a main ingredient. Additionally, there was sushan, a butter-like frozen dessert solidified at low temperatures and shaped like a mini-mountain, as well as binglao, a cold drink made by combining cow or goat milk with fruit juice. The Song dynasty poet Yang Wanli once wrote a poem titled Yong Binglao ('Ode to Ice Cheese'), though its correct title was later determined to be Yong Su ('Ode to Butter').

==== Earliest written documentation ====
The earliest known written process to artificially make ice is known not from culinary texts, but the 13th-century writings of Syrian historian Ibn Abi Usaybi'a in his book "Kitab Uyun al-anba fi tabaqat-al-atibba" (Book of Sources of Information on the Classes of Physicians) concerning medicine in which Ibn Abi Usaybi'a attributes the process to an even older author, Ibn Bakhtawayhi, of whom nothing is known.

Ice cream production became easier with the discovery of the endothermic effect. Prior to this, cream could be chilled easily but not frozen. The addition of salt lowered the melting point of ice, drawing heat from the cream and allowing it to freeze.

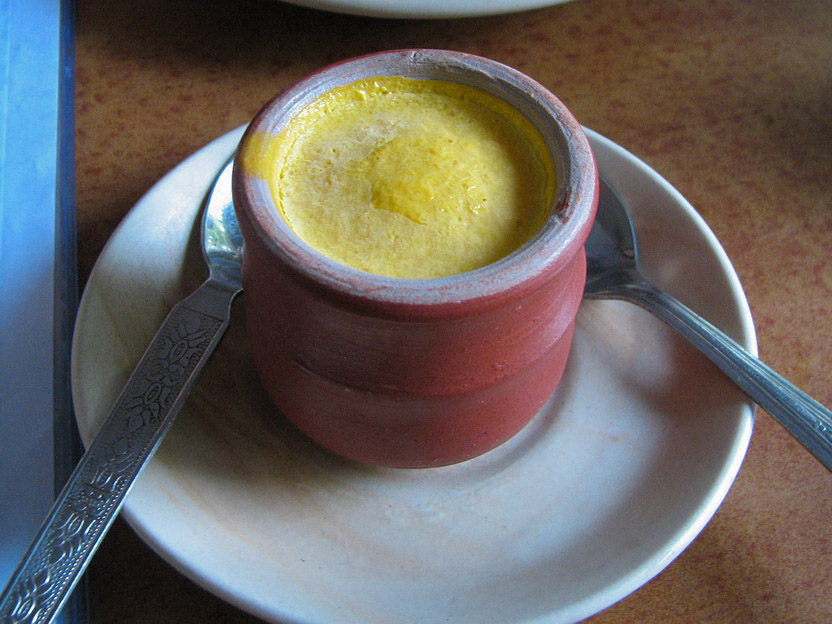
Kulfi in a matka pot from India

In the 16th century, the Mughal Empire used relays of horsemen to bring ice from the Hindu Kush to its capital, Delhi, used to create kulfi, a popular frozen dairy dessert from the Indian subcontinent often described as traditional Indian ice cream. Although Delhi has been described as the birthplace of kulfi, Australian food historian Charmaine O'Brien suggests:

"...it is likely that [kulfi] originally evolved in the cooler climates of Persia or Samarkand and that the Mughals appropriated the concept and elaborated on it to create the creamy, perfumed dessert that it now is."

=== Europe ===
The technique of freezing was not known from any European sources prior to the 16th century. During the 16th century, authors made reference to the refrigerant effect that happened when salt was added to ice. By the latter part of the 17th century sorbets and ice creams were made using this process.

Ice cream's spread throughout Europe is sometimes attributed to Moorish traders, but more often Marco Polo. Though it is not mentioned in any of his writings, Polo is often credited with introducing sorbet-style desserts to Italy after learning of them during his travels to China. According to a legend, the Italian duchess Catherine de' Medici introduced flavoured sorbet ices to France when she brought Italian chefs with her to France upon marrying the Duke of Orléans (Henry II of France) in 1533. However, no Italian chefs were present in France during the Medici period, and ice cream already existed in France before de Medici was born. One hundred years later, Charles I of England was reportedly so impressed by the "frozen snow" that he offered his own ice cream maker a lifetime pension in return for keeping the formula secret, so that ice cream could be a royal prerogative. There is no evidence to support these legends.

==== France ====
In 1665, the Catalogue des Marchandises rares..., edited in Montpellier by Jean Fargeon, listed a type of frozen sorbet. While the composition of this sorbet is not provided, Fargeon specified that it was consumed frozen using a container that was plunged into a mixture of ice and saltpetre. These sorbets were transported in pots made of clay and sold for three livres per pound.

According to L'Isle des Hermaphrodites, the practice of cooling drinks with ice and snow had already emerged in Paris, particularly in the court, during the 16th century. The narrator notes that his hosts stored ice and snow, which they later added to their wine. This practice slowly progressed during the reign of Louis XIII and was likely a necessary step towards the creation of ice cream. In 1682, Le Nouveau confiturier françois provided a recipe for a specific type of ice cream, called "neige de fleur d'orange".

In 1686, the italian Francesco Procopio dei Coltelli, born in Palermo (Sicily), opened an ice cream café in Paris, leading to another 250 Paris cafés serving ice cream over the next 50 years.

The first recipe in French for flavoured ices appears in 1674, in Nicholas Lemery's Recueil de curiositéz rares et nouvelles de plus admirables effets de la nature. Recipes for sorbetti saw publication in the 1694 edition of Antonio Latini's Lo Scalco alla Moderna (The Modern Steward). Recipes for flavoured ices begin to appear in François Massialot's Nouvelle Instruction pour les Confitures, les Liqueurs, et les Fruits, starting with the 1692 edition. Massialot's recipes result in a coarse, pebbly texture. Latini claims that the results of his recipes should have the fine consistency of sugar and snow.

==== England ====
The first recorded mention of ice cream in England was in 1671. Elias Ashmole described the dishes served at the Feast of St George at Windsor for Charles II in 1671 and included "one plate of ice cream". The only table at the banquet with ice cream on it was that of the King. The first recipe for ice cream in English was published in Mrs. Mary Eales's Receipts, in London in 1718:

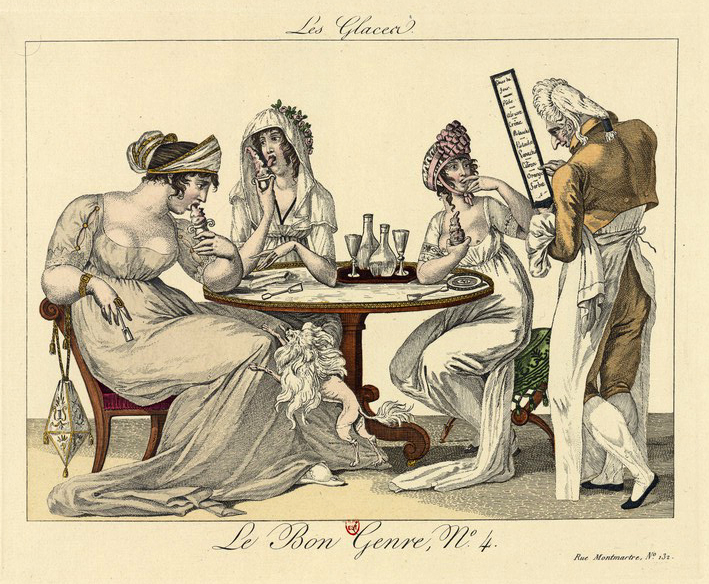
Noblewomen eating ice cream in a French caricature, 1801

To ice cream. Take Tin Ice-Pots, fill them with any Sort of Cream you like, either plain or sweeten'd, or Fruit in it; shut your Pots very close; to six Pots you must allow eighteen or twenty Pound of Ice, breaking the Ice very small; there will be some great Pieces, which lay at the Bottom and Top: You must have a Pail, and lay some Straw at the Bottom; then lay in your Ice, and put in amongst it a Pound of Bay-Salt; set in your Pots of Cream, and lay Ice and Salt between every Pot, that they may not touch; but the Ice must lie round them on every Side; lay a good deal of Ice on the Top, cover the Pail with Straw, set it in a Cellar where no Sun or Light comes, it will be froze in four Hours, but it may stand longer; then take it out just as you use it; hold it in your Hand and it will slip out. When you wou'd freeze any Sort of Fruit, either Cherries, Raspberries, Currants, or Strawberries, fill your Tin-Pots with the Fruit, but as hollow as you can; put to them Lemmonade, made with Spring-Water and Lemmon-Juice sweeten'd; put enough in the Pots to make the Fruit hang together, and put them in Ice as you do Cream.

— Mrs. Mary Eale's Receipts (1718)

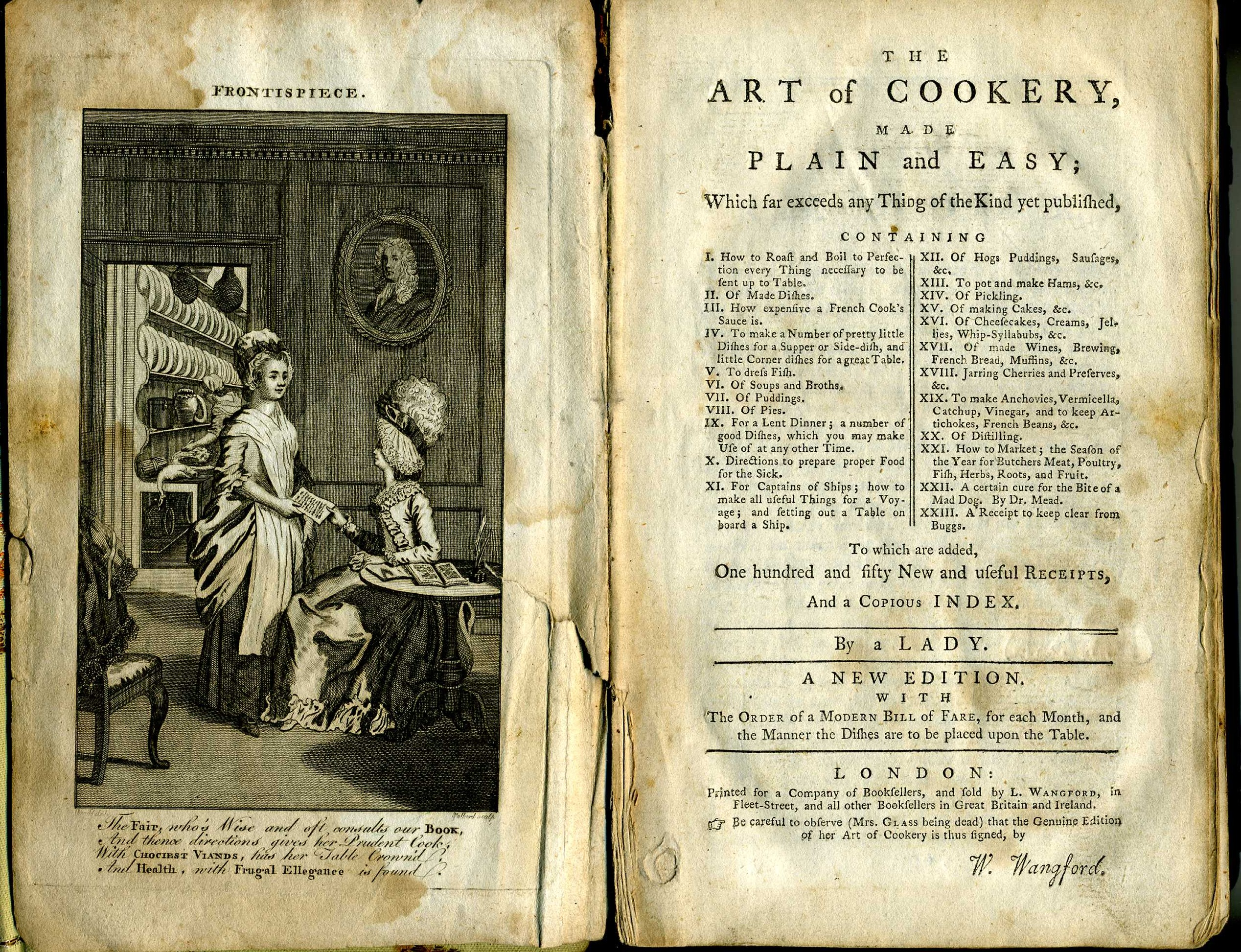
Title page to The Art of Cookery by Hannah Glasse

The 1751 edition of The Art of Cookery made Plain and Easy by Hannah Glasse includes a recipe for ice cream: "H. GLASSE Art of Cookery (ed. 4) 333 (heading) To make Ice Cream...set it [the cream] into the larger Bason. Fill it with Ice, and a Handful of Salt." L'Art de Bien Faire les Glaces d'Office by M. Emy, in 1768, was a cookbook devoted to recipes for flavoured ices and ice cream.

In 1769 Domenico Negri, an Italian confectioner, founded a business in Berkeley Square London which would become famous for its ice creams. His shop was at the Sign of the Pineapple (an emblem used by confectioners) and his trade card said he sold "All Sorts of English, French and Italian wet and dry'd Sweet Meats, Cedrati and Bergamot Chips, Naples Diavoloni, All sorts of Baskets & Cakes, fine and Common Sugar plums", but most importantly, "all Sorts of Ice, Fruits and creams in the best Italian manner."

In 1789, Frederick Nutt, who served an apprenticeship at Negri's establishment, first published The Complete Confectioner. The book had 31 recipes for ice creams, some with fresh fruit, others with jams, and some using fruit syrups. Flavours included ginger, chocolate, brown breadcrumbs, and Parmesan cheese.

=== Asia ===
==== Japan ====
Kakigōri is a Japanese dessert made with ice and flavoured syrup. The origins of kakigōri date back to the Heian period in Japanese history, when blocks of ice saved during the colder months would be shaved and served with sweet syrup to the Japanese aristocracy during the summer. Kakigōri's origin is referred to in The Pillow Book, a book of observations written by Sei Shōnagon, who served the Imperial Court during the Heian period.

=== North America ===
An early North American reference to ice cream is from an account in 1744 of a dinner held by governor Thomas Bladen and his wife: "...after which came a Dessert no less Curious. Among the Rarities of which it was Compos'd, was some fine Ice Cream, which, with the Strawberries and Milk, eat most Deliciously."

Who brought ice cream to the United States first is unknown. Confectioners sold ice cream at their shops in New York and other cities during the colonial era. Benjamin Franklin, George Washington, and Thomas Jefferson were known to have regularly eaten and served ice cream. Records, kept by a merchant from Chatham street, New York, show George Washington spending approximately $200 on ice cream in the summer of 1790. The same records show president Thomas Jefferson having an 18-step recipe for ice cream. Although it is incorrect that Jefferson introduced ice cream to America, as is popularly believed, he did help to introduce vanilla ice cream. First Lady Dolley Madison, wife of U.S. President James Madison, served ice cream at her husband's Inaugural Ball in 1813.

Small-scale hand-cranked ice cream freezers were invented in England by Agnes Marshall and in America by Nancy Johnson in the 1840s.

=== Expansion in popularity ===
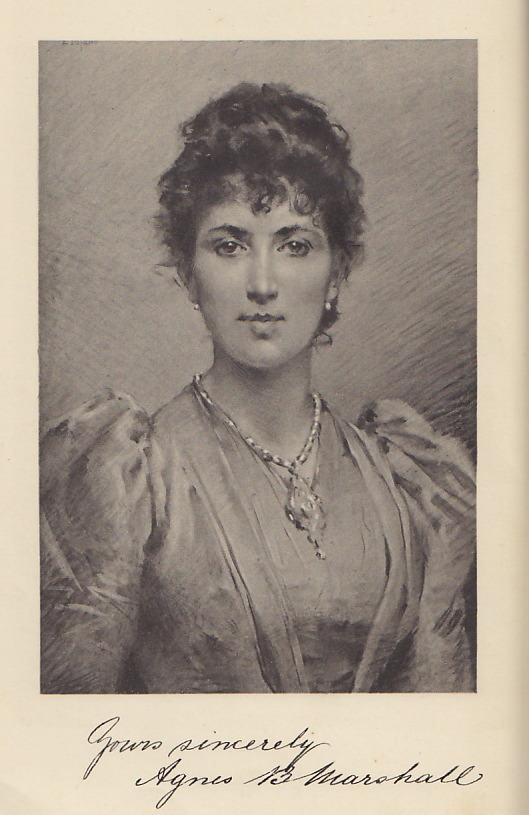
Agnes Marshall, "queen of ices", instrumental in making ice-cream fashionable

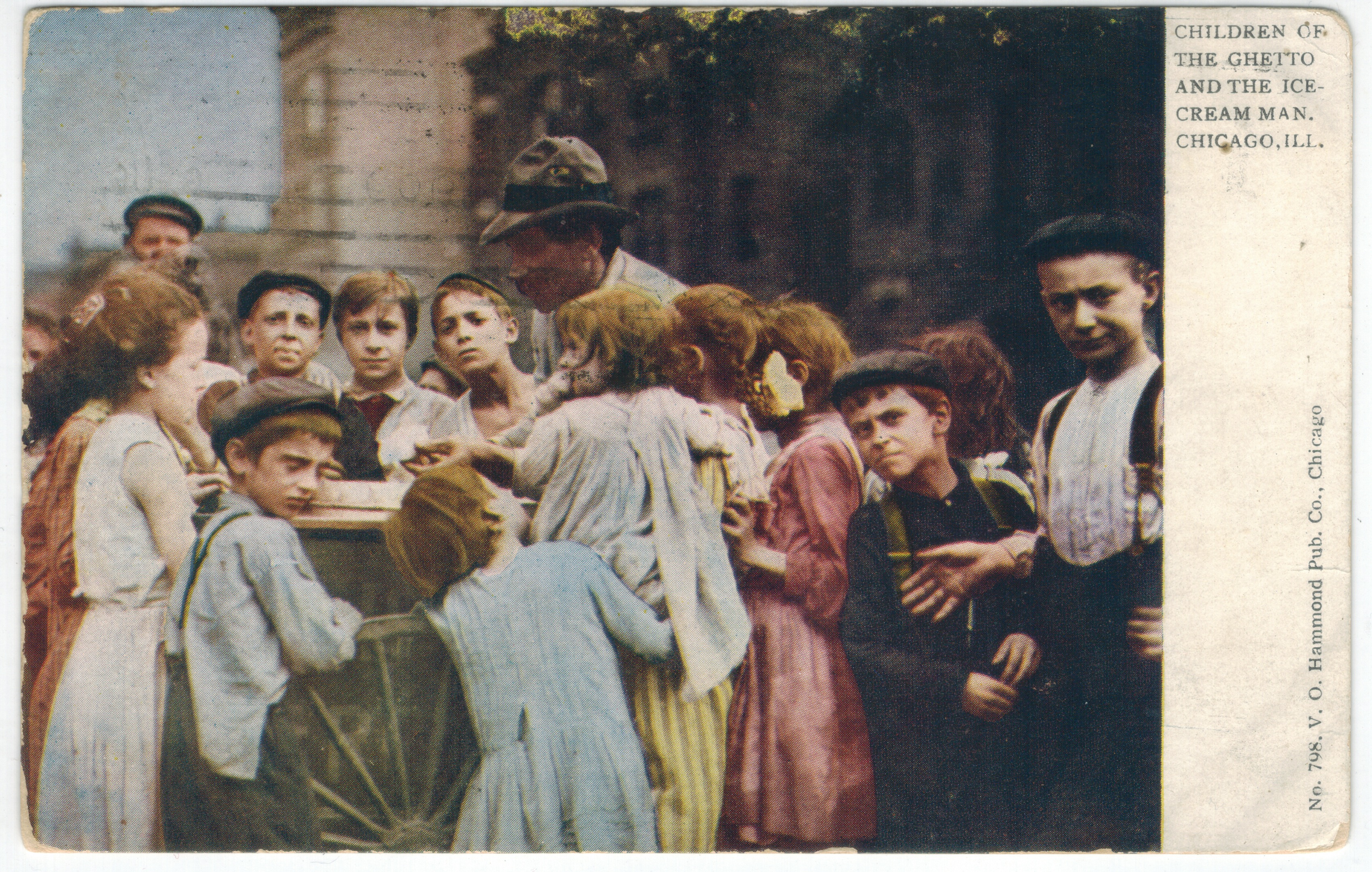
Children in Chicago surround an ice cream vendor in 1909.

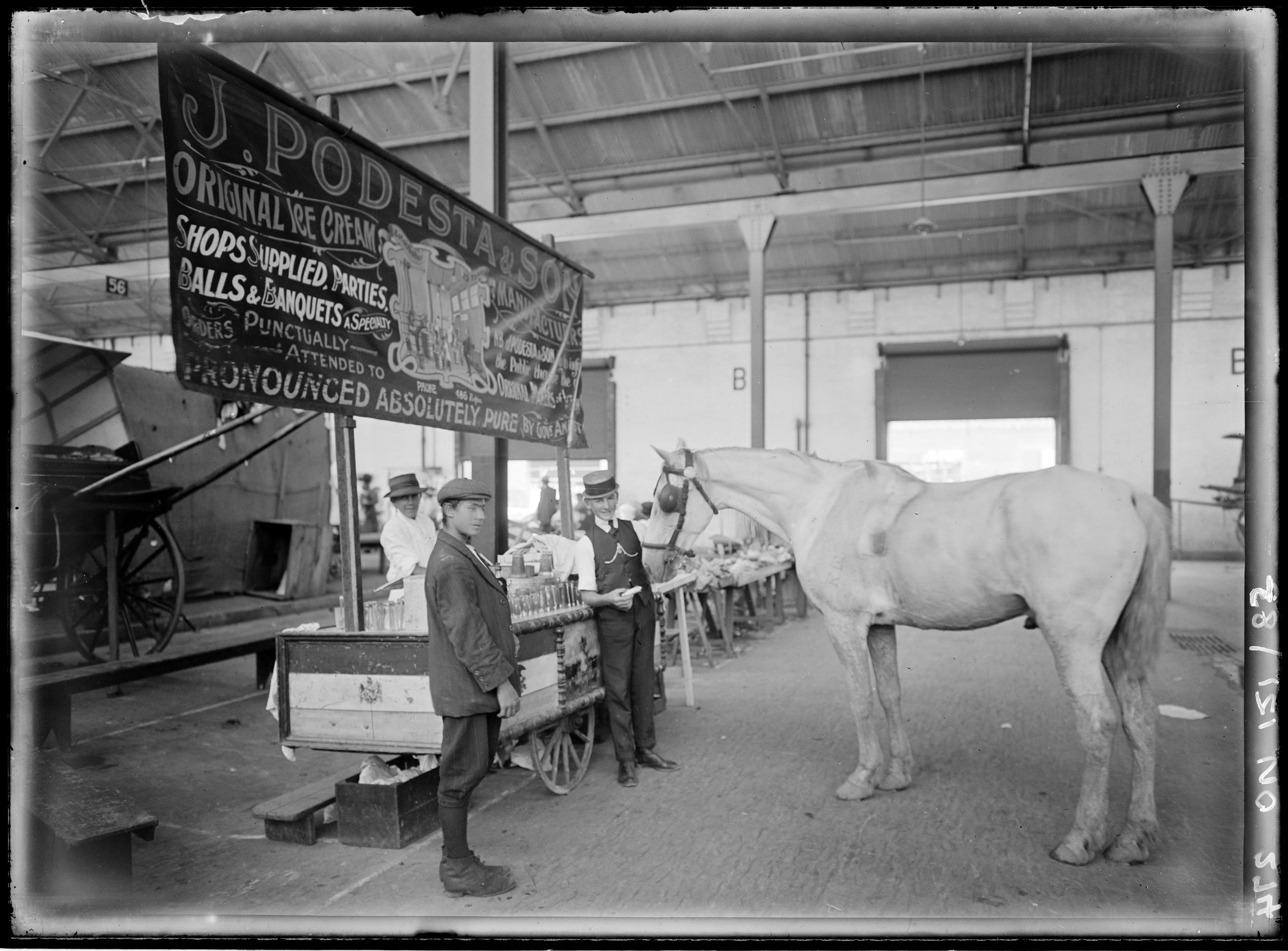
J Podesta, Ice Cream maker's stall, Sydney Markets, c. 1910

In the Mediterranean, ice cream appears to have been accessible to ordinary people by the mid-18th century. Ice cream became popular and inexpensive in England in the mid-19th century, when Swiss émigré Carlo Gatti set up the first stand outside Charing Cross station in 1851. He sold scoops in shells for one penny. Prior to this, ice cream was an expensive treat confined to those with access to an ice house. Gatti built an 'ice well' to store ice that he cut from Regent's Canal under a contract with the Regent's Canal Company. By 1860, he expanded the business and began importing ice on a large scale from Norway.

In New Zealand, a newspaper advertisement for ice cream appeared in 1866, claiming to be the first time ice cream was available in Wellington. Commercial manufacturing was underway in 1875. Ice cream rapidly gained in popularity in New Zealand throughout the 20th century. By 2018, exported ice cream products included new flavours such as matcha to cater to Asian markets.

Agnes Marshall, regarded as the "queen of ices" in England, did much to popularize ice cream recipes and make its consumption into a fashionable middle-class pursuit. She wrote four books: The Book of Ices (1885), Mrs. A.B. Marshall's Book of Cookery (1888), Mrs. A.B. Marshall's Larger Cookery Book of Extra Recipes (1891) and Fancy Ices (1894) and gave public lectures on cooking. She even suggested using liquid nitrogen to make ice cream.

Ice cream soda was invented in the 1870s, adding to ice cream's popularity. The invention of this is attributed to American Robert Green in 1874, although there is no conclusive evidence to prove his claim. The ice cream sundae originated in the late 19th century. Some sources say that the sundae was invented to circumvent blue laws, which forbade serving sodas on Sunday. Towns claiming to be the birthplace of the sundae include Buffalo, Two Rivers, Ithaca, and Evanston. Both the ice cream cone and banana split became popular in the early 20th century.

The first mention of the cone being used as an edible receptacle for the ice cream is in Mrs. A.B. Marshall's Book of Cookery of 1888. Her recipe for "Cornet with Cream" said that "the cornets were made with almonds and baked in the oven, not pressed between irons". The ice cream cone was popularized in the US at the 1904 World's Fair in St. Louis, Missouri.

The history of ice cream in the 20th century is one of great change and increases in availability and popularity. In the United States in the early 20th century, the ice cream soda was a popular treat at the soda shop, the soda fountain, and the ice cream parlour. During the American Prohibition, the soda fountain to some extent replaced the outlawed alcohol establishments such as bars and saloons.

Ice cream became popular throughout the world in the second half of the 20th century after cheap refrigeration became common. There was an explosion of ice cream stores and of flavours and types. Vendors often competed on the basis of variety: Howard Johnson's restaurants advertised "a world of 28 flavors", and Baskin-Robbins made its 31 flavours ("one for every day of the month") the cornerstone of its marketing strategy (the company now boasts that it has developed over 1,000 varieties).

One important development in the 20th century was the introduction of soft ice cream, which has more air mixed in, thereby reducing costs. The soft ice cream machine fills a cone or dish from a spigot. In the United States, chains such as Dairy Queen, Carvel, and Tastee-Freez helped popularize soft-serve ice cream. Baskin-Robbins later incorporated it into their menu.

Technological innovations such as these have introduced various food additives into ice cream, most notably the stabilizing agent gluten, to which some people have an intolerance. Recent awareness of this issue has prompted a number of manufacturers to start producing gluten-free ice cream.

The 1980s saw thicker ice creams being sold as "premium" and "super-premium" varieties under brands such as Ben & Jerry's, Chocolate Shoppe Ice Cream Company and Häagen-Dazs.

== Composition ==
Ice cream is a colloidal emulsion made with water, ice, milk fat, milk protein, sugar and air. Water and fat have the highest proportions by weight creating an emulsion that has a dispersed phase as fat globules. The emulsion is turned into foam by incorporating air cells which are frozen to form dispersed ice cells. The triacylglycerols in fat are nonpolar and will adhere to themselves by Van der Waals interactions. Water is polar, thus emulsifiers are needed for dispersion of fat. Also, ice cream has a colloidal phase of foam which helps in its light texture. Milk proteins such as casein and whey protein present in ice cream are amphiphilic, can adsorb water and form micelles which will contribute to its consistency. The proteins contribute to the emulsification, aeration and texture. Sucrose, which is a disaccharide, is usually used as a sweetening agent. Lactose, which is sugar present in milk, will cause freezing point depression. Thus, on freezing some water will remain unfrozen and will not give a hard texture. Too much lactose will result in a non-ideal texture because of either excessive freezing point depression or lactose crystallization.

== Ingredients and legal definitions ==
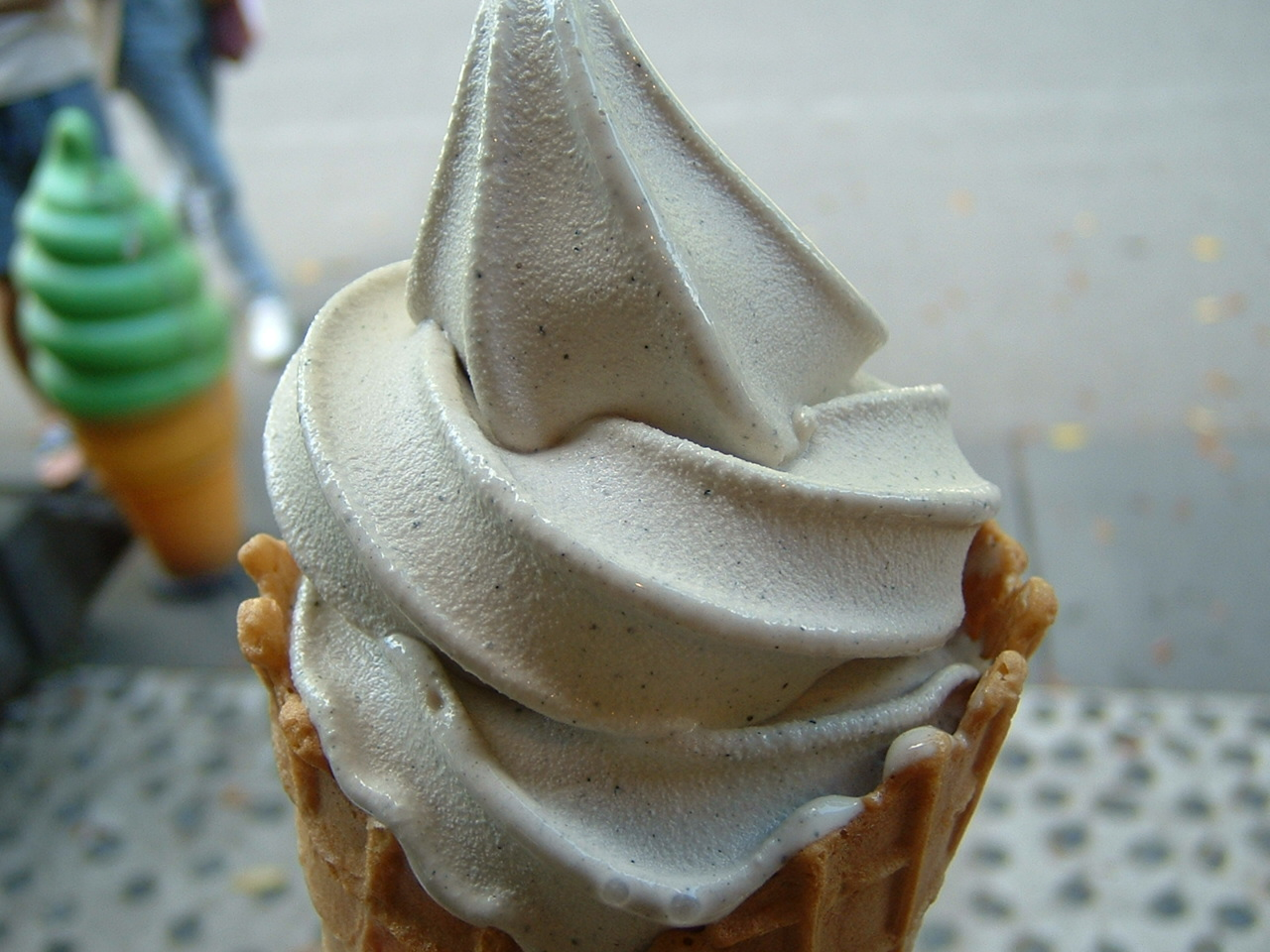
Soft serve black sesame ice cream in Japan

Many countries have regulations controlling what can be described as ice cream.

In the United Kingdom, Food Labelling Regulations (1996) set a requirement of at least 5% milk fat and 2.5% milk protein in order to be sold as ice cream within the UK. In rest of the European Union, a trade organization called European Ice Cream Association calls for minimum dairy fat content of 5%. In 2015, these regulations were relaxed so that containing milk fat or protein was no longer necessary in the UK for a product to be sold as "ice cream", though at least 5% milk fat is still required for a product to be labeled "dairy ice cream". After this change, many UK products labelled as "ice cream" substitute milk fat with cheaper alternatives like palm oil, coconut oil, and vegetable fats.

In the US, the FDA rules state that to be described as "ice cream", a product must have the following composition:

- greater than 10% milk fat
- 6 to 10% milk and non-fat milk solids: this component, also known as the milk solids-not-fat or serum solids, contains the proteins (caseins and whey proteins) and carbohydrates (lactose) found in milk

It generally also has:

- 12 to 16% sweeteners: usually a combination of sucrose and glucose-based corn syrup sweeteners
- 0.2 to 0.5% stabilizers and emulsifiers
- 55 to 64% water, which comes from the milk or other ingredients

These compositions are percentage by weight. Since ice cream can contain as much as half air by volume, these numbers may be reduced by as much as half if cited by volume. In terms of dietary considerations, the percentages by weight are more relevant. Even low-fat products have high caloric content: Ben and Jerry's No-Fat Vanilla Fudge, for instance, contains 150 calories (630 kJ) per half-cup due to its high sugar content.

According to the Canadian Food and Drugs Act and Regulations, ice cream in Canada is divided into "ice cream mix" and "ice cream". Each has a different set of regulations.

- "Ice cream" must be at least 10 percent milk fat, and must contain at least 180 grams (6.3 oz) of solids per litre. When cocoa, chocolate syrup, fruit, nuts, or confections are added, the percentage of milk fat can be 8 percent.
- "Ice cream mix" is defined as the pasteurized mix of cream, milk and other milk products that are not yet frozen. It may contain eggs, artificial or non-artificial flavours, cocoa or chocolate syrup, a food colour, an agent that adjusts the pH level in the mix, salt, a stabilizing agent that does not exceed 0.5% of the ice cream mix, a sequestering agent which preserves the food colour, edible casein that does not exceed 1% of the mix, propylene glycol mono fatty acids in an amount that will not exceed 0.35% of the ice cream mix, and sorbitan tristearate in an amount that will not exceed 0.035% of the mix. Ice cream mix may not include less than 36% solid components.

== Physical properties ==
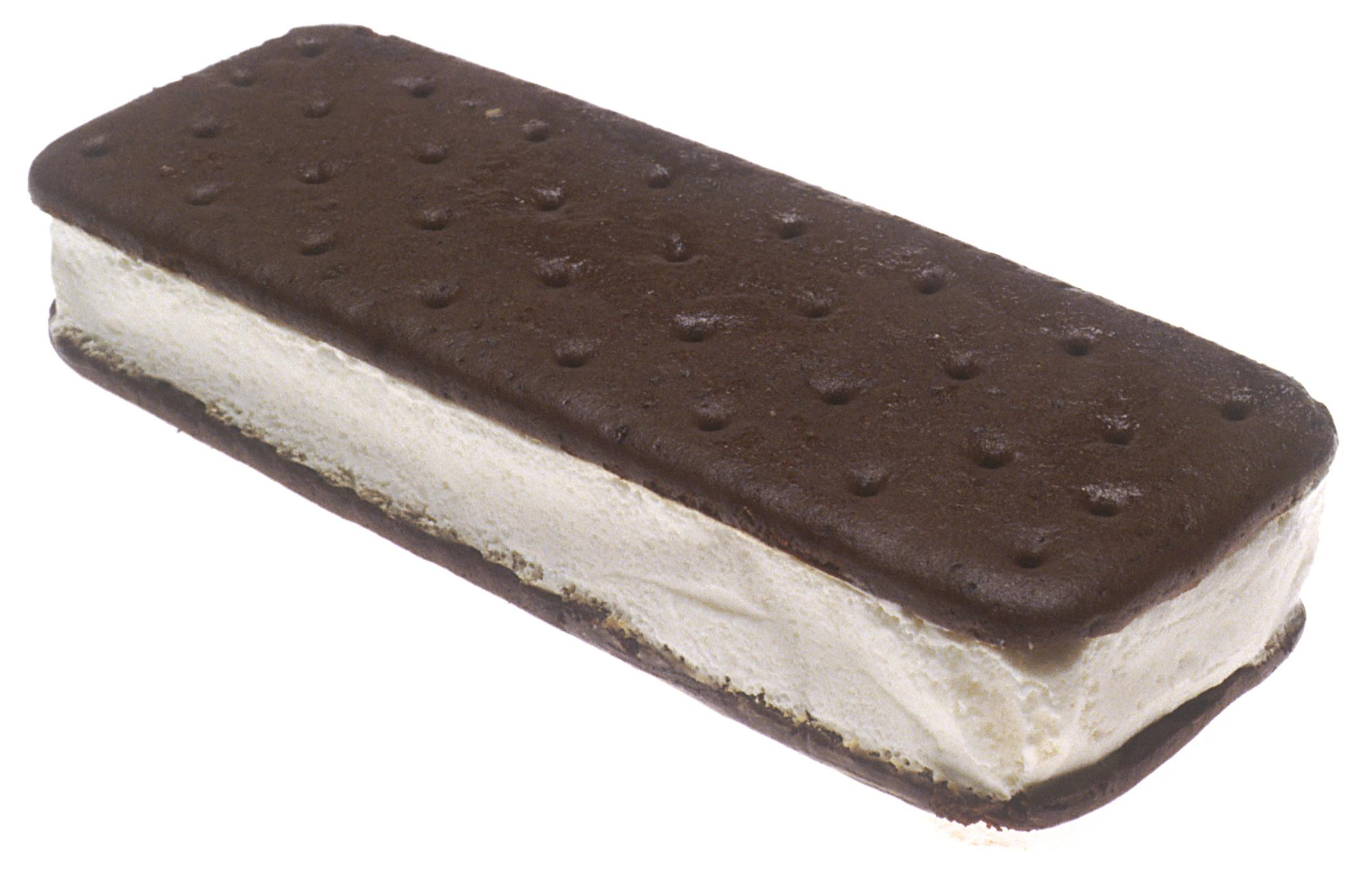
Ice cream sandwich

Ice cream is considered a colloidal system. It is composed by ice cream crystals and aggregates, air that does not mix with the ice cream by forming small bubbles in the bulk and partially coalesced fat globules. This dispersed phase made from all the small particles is surrounded by an unfrozen continuous phase composed by sugars, proteins, salts, polysaccharides and water. Their interactions determine the properties of ice cream, whether soft and whippy or hard.

=== Ostwald ripening ===
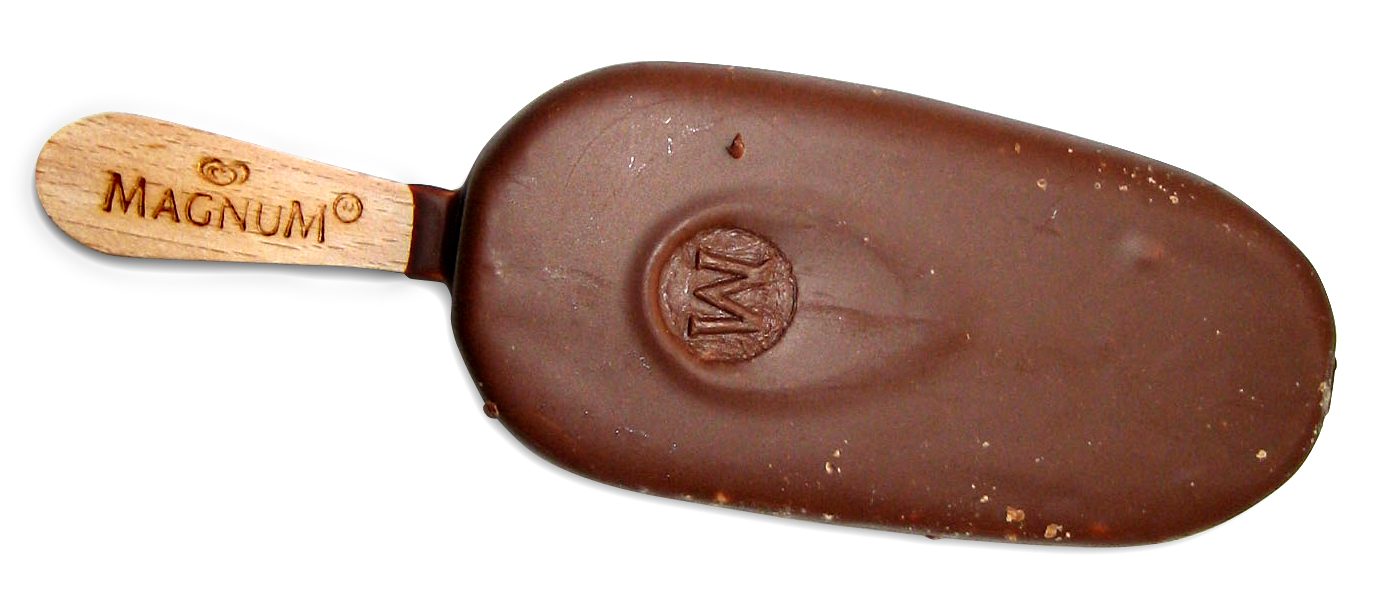
Chocolate-glazed Magnum ice cream bar

Ostwald ripening is the explanation for the growth of large crystals at the expense of small ones in the dispersion phase. This process is also called migratory recrystallization. It involves the formation of sharp crystals. Theories about Ostwald recrystallization admit that after a period of time, the recrystallization process can be described by the following equation:

$r = r (0) + Rt \exp(1/n)$

Where r (0) is the initial size, n the order of recrystallization, and t a time constant for recrystallization that depends on the rate R (in units of size/time).

To make ice cream smooth, recrystallization must occur as slowly as possible, because small crystals create smoothness, meaning that r must decrease.

== Retail sales ==
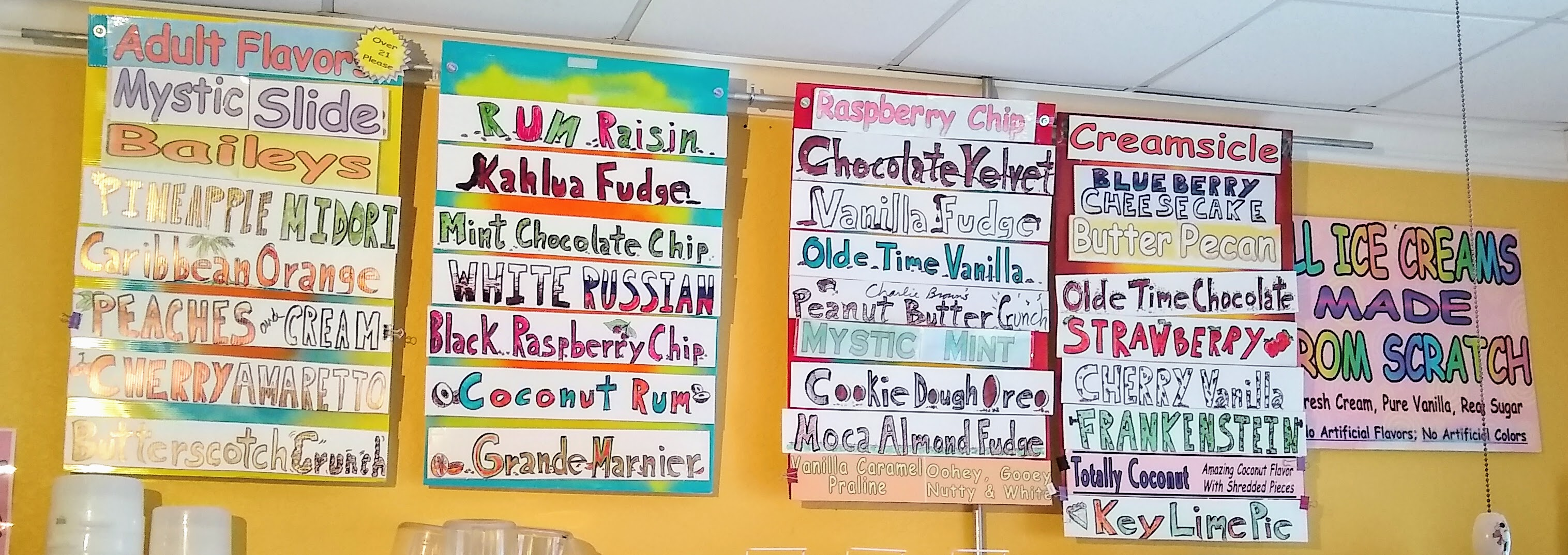
A selection of ice cream flavours available at an ice cream shop in Fruitland Park, Florida

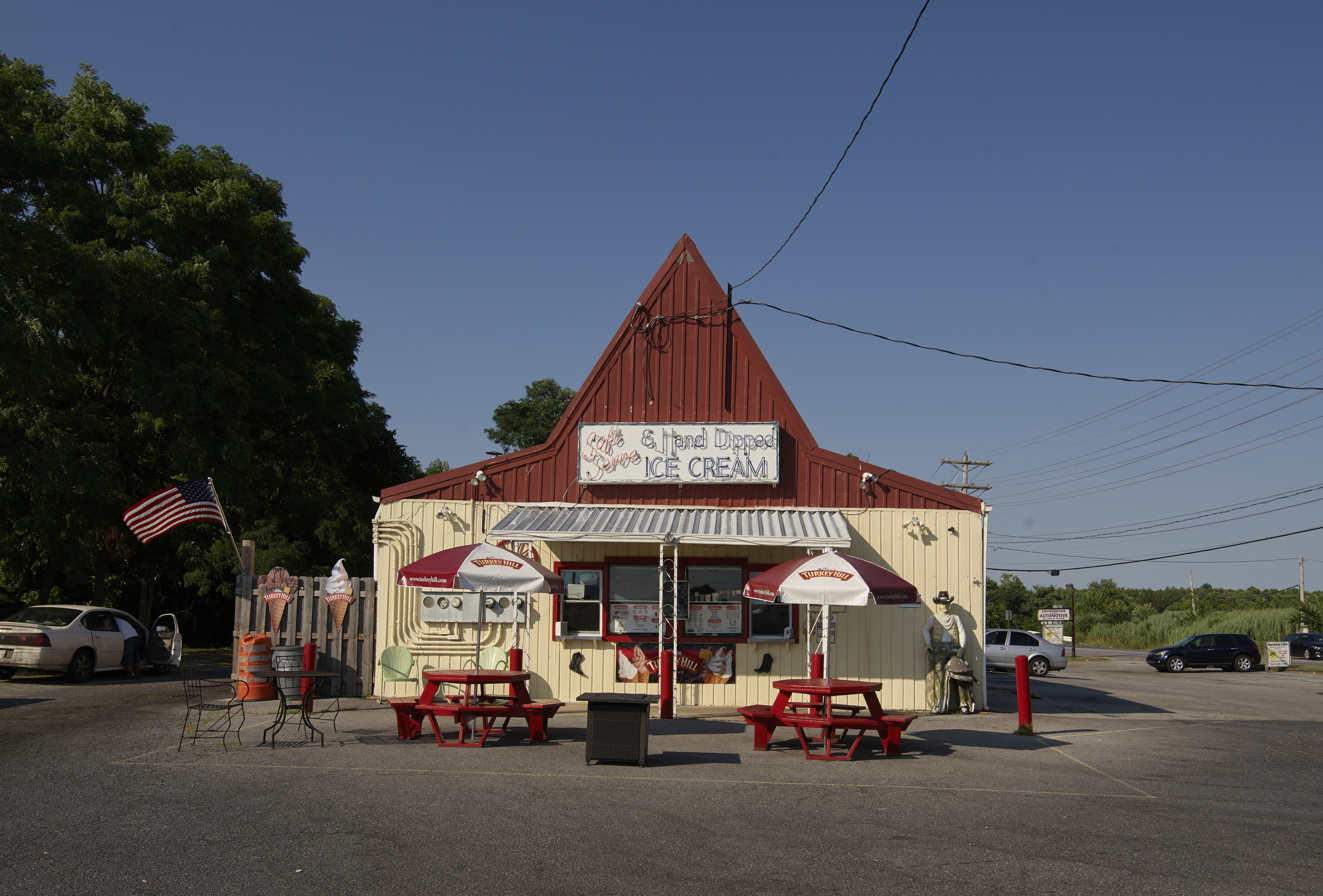
Ice cream stand in New Castle, Delaware

Ice cream can be mass-produced and thus is widely available in developed parts of the world. Ice cream can be purchased in large cartons (vats and squrounds) from supermarkets and grocery stores, in smaller quantities from ice cream shops, convenience stores, and milk bars, and in individual servings from small carts or vans at public events. In 2015, the US produced nearly 900 million US gallons (3.4×10^{9} L; 750,000,000 imp gal) of ice cream.

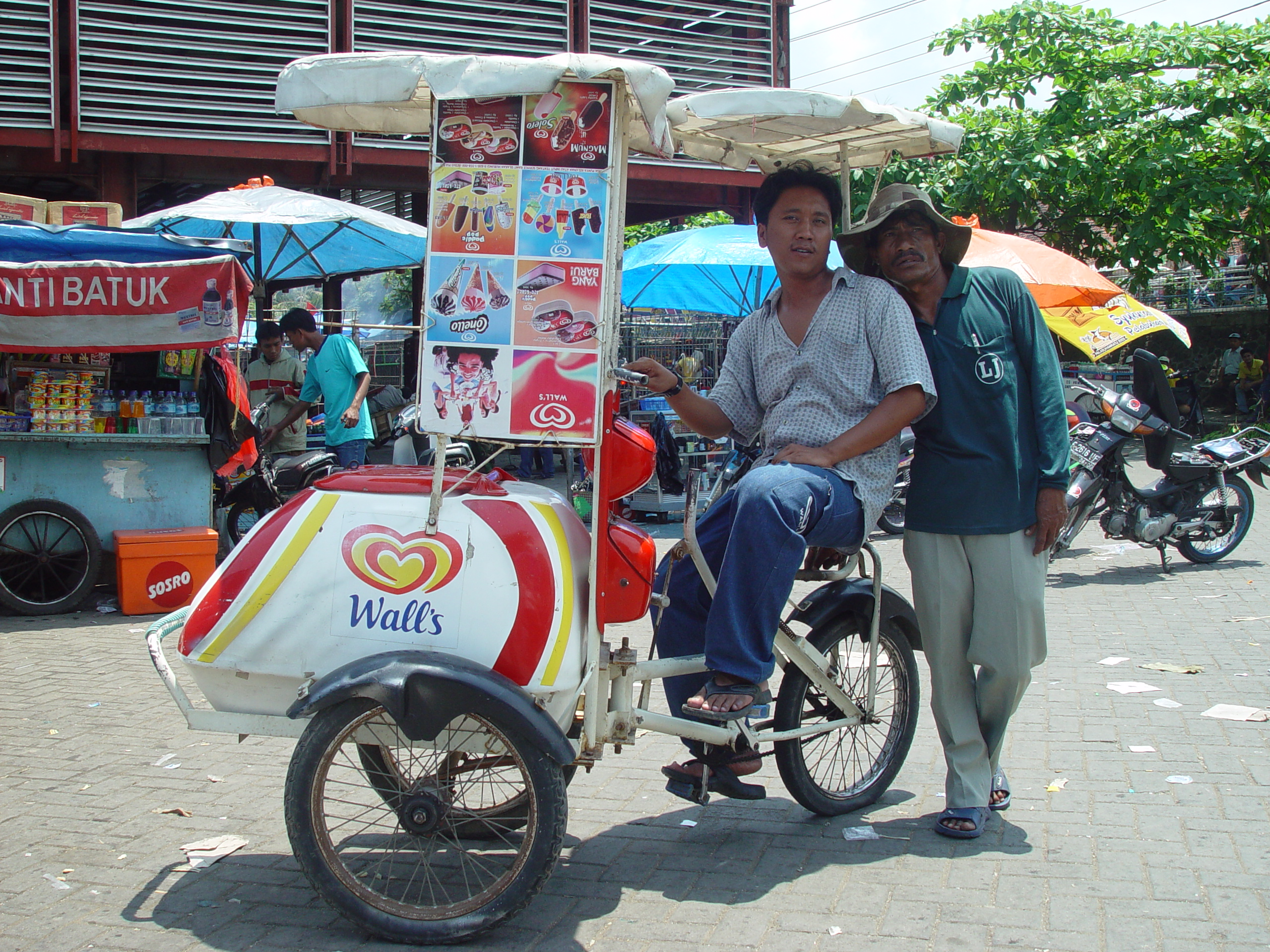
A bicycle-based ice cream street vendor in Indonesia

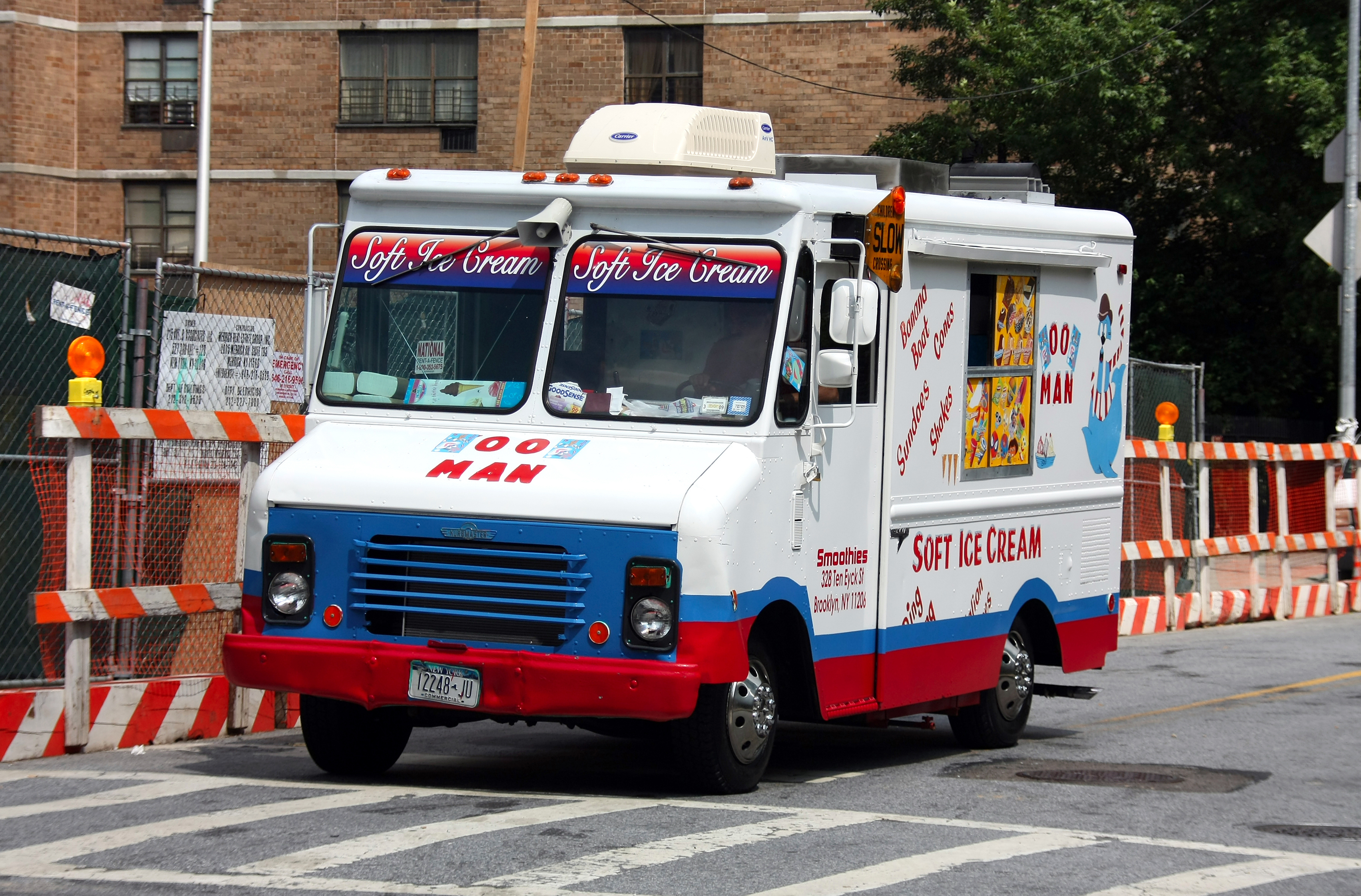
Ice cream truck in East Village, Manhattan

== Around the world ==
Around the world, different cultures have developed unique versions of ice cream, suiting the product to local tastes and preferences.

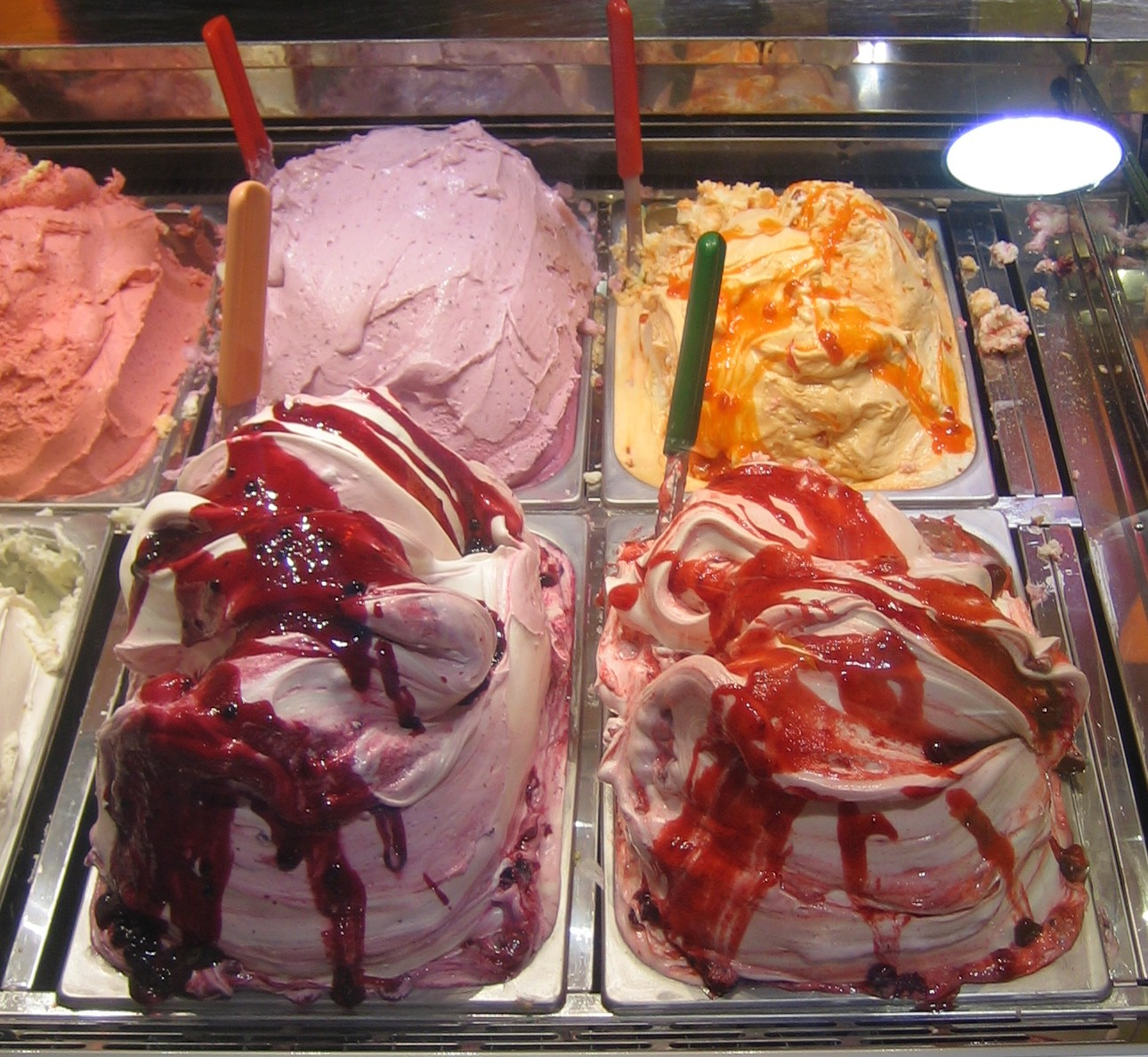
Gelato in Rome, Italy

Italian ice cream, also known as gelato, is a traditional and popular dessert in Italy. Much of the production is still hand-made and flavoured by each individual shop in gelaterie a produzione propria. Gelato is made from whole milk, sugar, sometimes eggs, and natural flavourings. It typically contains 4–9% fat, less than ice cream's minimum of 10%. Per capita, Australians and New Zealanders are among the leading ice cream consumers in the world, eating 18 litres (4.0 imp gal; 4.8 US gal) and 20 litres (4.4 imp gal; 5.3 US gal) each per year respectively, behind the United States where people eat 23 litres (5.1 imp gal; 6.1 US gal) each per year.

Ice Golas are a summer treat consisting of shaved ice packed into a popsicle form on a stick and soaked in flavoured sugar syrup, a popular choice being kala khatta in India, made from the sweet and sour jamun fruit. In Puerto Rico a popular dessert is the Piragua, shaved ice put into a cone shaped cup, with different syrup flavors poured on top of the ice. Vendors walk on sidewalks and near the beach with a small cart containing a huge block of ice and 10 to 15 bottles containing fruit syrups such as Tamarindo and Parcha.

In Spain, ice cream is often in the style of Italian gelato. Spanish helado can be found in many cafés or speciality ice cream stores. While many traditional flavours are sold, cafés may also sell flavours like nata, viola, crema catalana, or tiramisu. In the 1980s, the Spanish industry was known for creating many creative and weird ice cream bars.

In the United Kingdom, 14 million adults buy ice cream as a treat, in a market worth £1.8 billion (according to a report produced in 2024). In the United States, ice cream made with just cream, sugar, and a flavouring (usually fruit) is sometimes referred to as "Philadelphia style" ice cream. Ice cream that uses eggs to make a custard is sometimes called "French ice cream". American federal labelling standards require ice cream to contain a minimum of 10% milk fat. Americans consume about 23 litres of ice cream per person per year—the most in the world. According to the NPD Group, the most popular ice cream flavours in the U.S. are vanilla and chocolate with a combined market share of 40% as of 2008.

== Cones ==
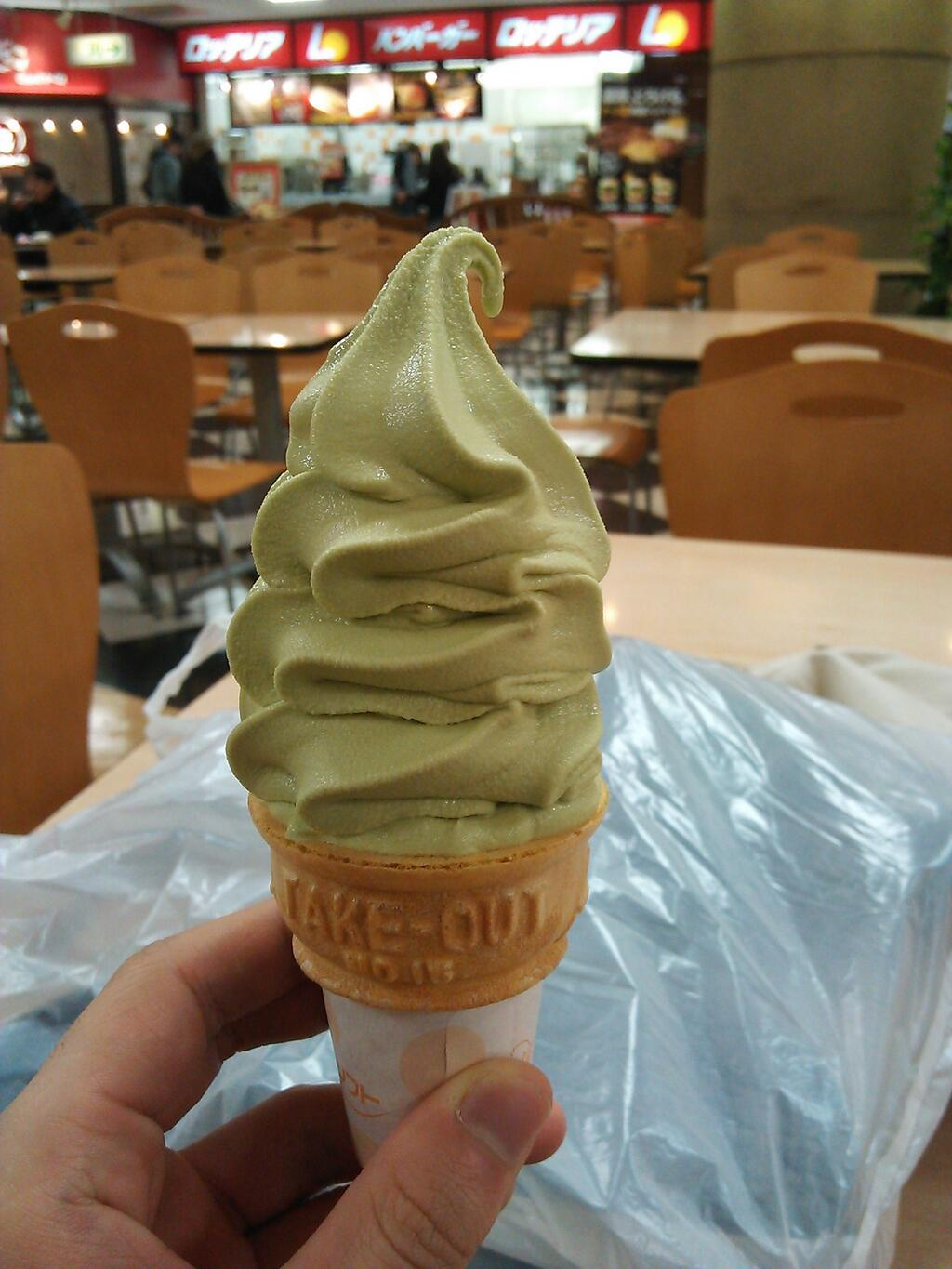
A green tea ice cream cone

Mrs A. B. Marshall's Cookery Book, published in 1888, endorsed serving ice cream in cones. Agnes Marshall was a celebrated cookery writer of her day and helped to popularize ice cream. She patented and manufactured an ice cream maker and was the first to suggest using liquefied gases to freeze ice cream after seeing a demonstration at the Royal Institution.

Reliable evidence proves that ice cream cones were served in the 19th century, and their popularity increased greatly during the St. Louis World's Fair in 1904. According to legend, an ice cream vendor at the fair ran out of cardboard dishes. The vendor at the Syrian waffle booth next door, unsuccessful in the intense heat, offered to make cones by rolling up his waffles. The new product sold well and was widely copied by other vendors.

== Cryogenics ==
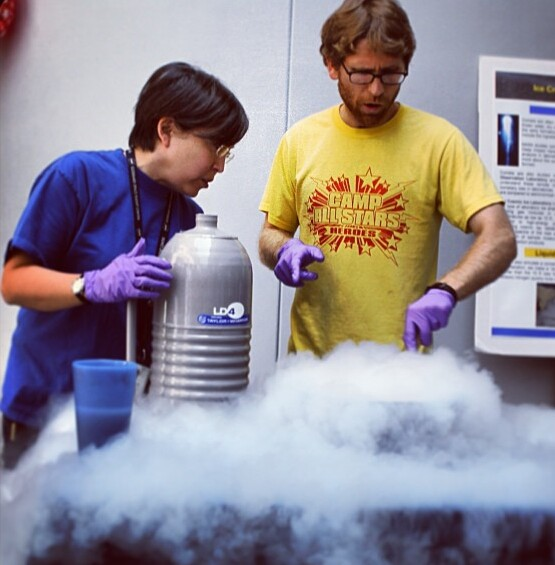
NASA staff at the Goddard Space Flight Center making ice cream with liquid nitrogen

In 2006, some commercial ice cream makers began to use liquid nitrogen in the primary freezing of ice cream, thus eliminating the need for a conventional ice cream freezer. The preparation results in a column of white condensed water vapour cloud. The ice cream, dangerous to eat while still "steaming" with liquid nitrogen, is allowed to rest until the liquid nitrogen is completely vaporized. Sometimes ice cream is frozen to the sides of the container, and must be allowed to thaw.

Good results can also be achieved with the more readily available dry ice, and authors such as Heston Blumenthal have published recipes to produce ice cream and sorbet using a simple blender.

== See also ==
- Gelato
- Italian ice
- Ice cream social
- List of dairy products
- List of desserts
- List of ice cream brands
- List of ice cream flavors
- List of ice cream parlor chains
