= Fosters Freeze =

Restaurant chain based in California, U.S.

- Industry: Fast food Franchising
- Founded: Inglewood, California, United States (1946; 80 years ago)
- Founder: George Foster
- Headquarters: Pomona, California, United States
- Number of locations: 58 (2026)
- Area served: California and Georgia
- Key people: Neal Dahya (President), Nimesh Dahya (Head of global business development), Sanjay Patel (Chief marketing officer)
- Products: Soft serve, hamburgers, chicken
- Parent: Mesh Brands
- Website: www.fostersfreeze.com

Fosters Freeze is an American chain of fast-food restaurants, primarily in California. Its first location, on La Brea Avenue in Inglewood, California, was opened by George Foster in 1946 and is still operating.

The chain's name refers to its soft-serve ice milk and milkshakes. Its marketing slogan is "California's Original Soft Serve." Its mascot is Little Foster, a smiling ice cream cone.

== History ==
Foster's Freeze ice cream stand in Cloverdale, California, 1991

George Foster moved to California after World War II to open outlets for Dairy Queen, since he owned the development rights in the state. However, state laws protecting the dairy industry prevented the use of dairy in restaurant names. So instead, in 1946, Foster opened a restaurant named after himself, Foster’s Old Fashion Freeze. (The apostrophe was later dropped.) In 1951, he sold the chain's 360 locations for $1 million. By 1987, it had been reduced to 189 locations.

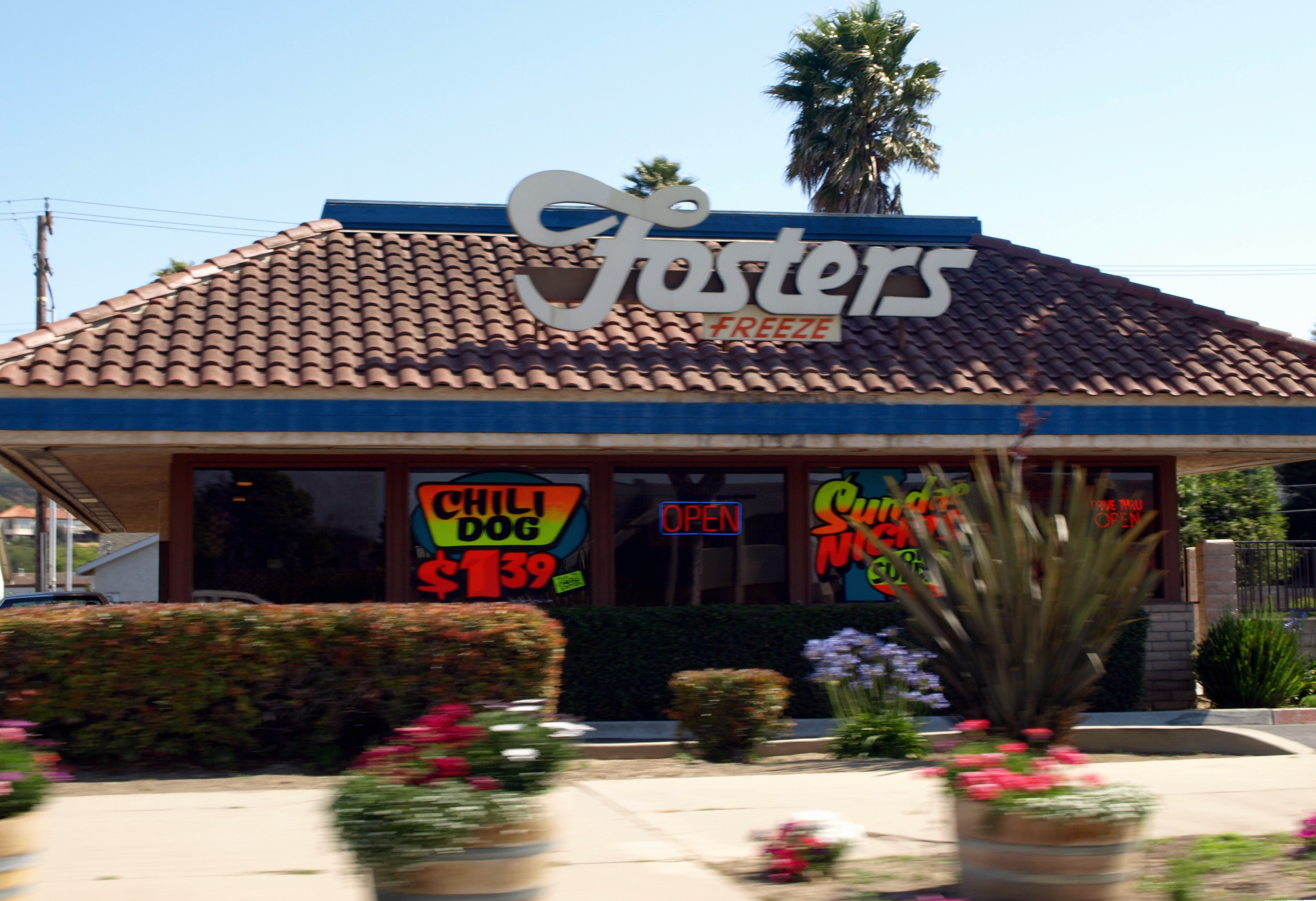
A Fosters Freeze restaurant in Lompoc, California

El Pollo Loco signed a master franchise contract with Fosters Freeze in 1994, allowing service of Fosters Freeze soft-serve ice cream in El Pollo Loco locations. In 2002, 163 El Pollo Loco locations sold Fosters Freeze products, and their overall sales increased by three to six percent. The contract ended in 2014.

The historical significance of Fosters Freeze restaurants attracts patrons and has united community members to preserve them. In 2006, residents of Menlo Park presented their city council a petition with about 400 signatures to prevent the demolition of their local Fosters, although it finally closed in 2015. The Santa Cruz location is listed in the city's historic building survey.

In 2015, a restaurant franchise investment group formed for the purpose (Fosters Freeze International LLC) and led by a former franchisee (Kishan Patel) bought Fosters Freeze. It modernized the brand and operations; sales have increased every year since then. As of 2021, the company plans to add locations for the first time since 2006. In January 2025, the owners of Fosters Freeze formed a new company, Mesh Brands, as the home of Fosters Freeze and ten other restaurant brands.

In November 2024, Fosters Freeze opened its first location outside of California just outside of Thomson, Georgia, which is situated inside a TA Express travel center off Interstate 20.

As of May 2026, there are 58 Fosters Freeze locations: 55 in California and 3 in Georgia.

== In popular culture ==
- The Beach Boys song "Fun, Fun, Fun" was inspired by the Fosters Freeze location in Hawthorne, California.
- The Fosters Freeze in Atwater Village, Los Angeles appeared in the movie Pulp Fiction.
- In the drama film Twentynine Palms, the main characters eat soft serve at a Fosters Freeze.
