= Ice cream stand =

Free-standing seasonal retail outlet for ice cream

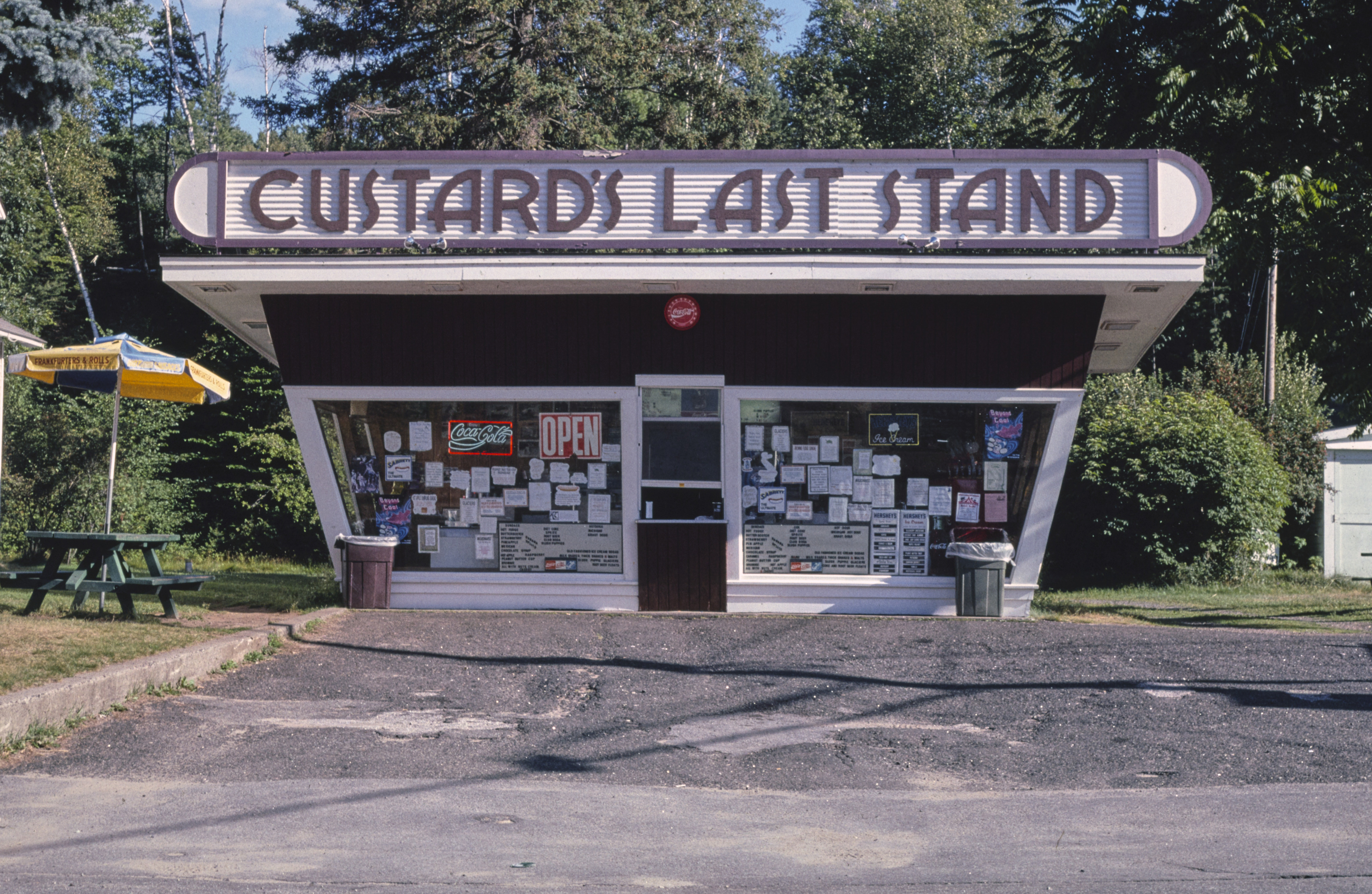
Custard's Last Stand, a well-preserved example of mid-20th-century ice cream stands in Long Lake, New York

An ice cream stand is a retail outlet, primarily for soft serve ice cream, that has a form and function distinct from an ice cream parlor or an ice cream cart. Ice cream stands are typically free-standing buildings with no indoor seating, usually constructed alongside a road to attract passing drivers. Without indoor seating, ice cream stands typically operate seasonally during the summer, often in vacation areas, and are closed during winter. As a form of fast-food restaurant, ice cream stands emerged in the post–World War II era, particularly in areas in which the use of private cars became widespread, such as the United States.

Prominent brands such as Dairy Queen and Howard Johnson's pioneered the business model, and many ice cream stands adopted an architectural form developed by Carvel featuring large glass windows, canted walls and upward sloping roofs. Over time, though, larger brands left the ice cream stand sector and most stands are independently owned, operated and branded. Ice cream stands remain prevalent in the Northeastern and Midwestern United States.

== History ==
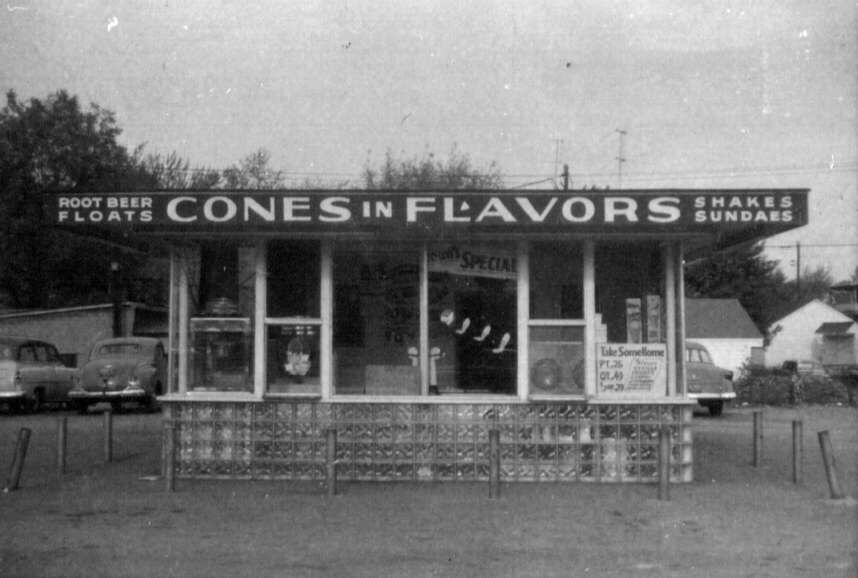
A glass-block ice cream stand in Lucas County, Ohio

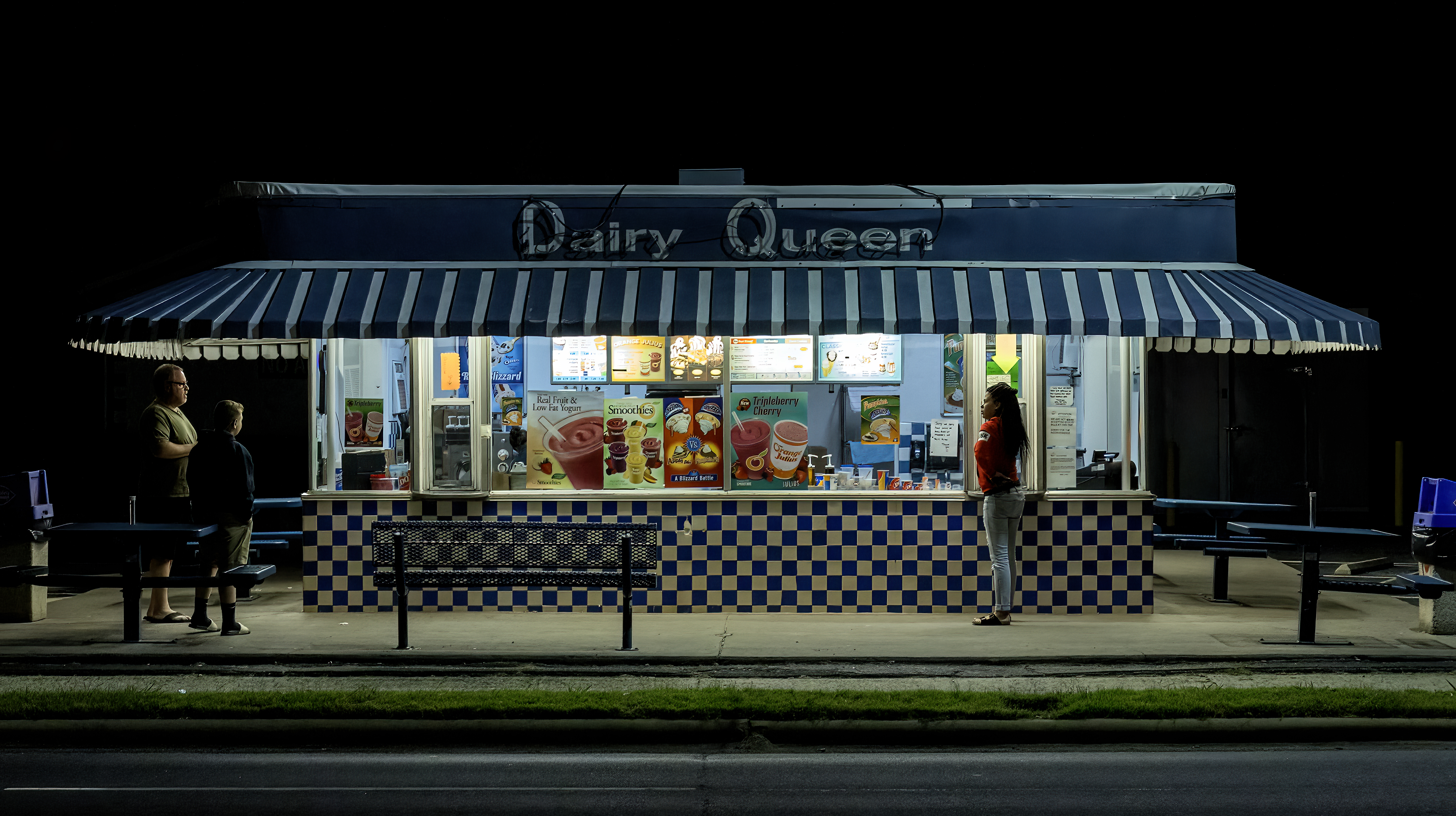
A walk-up Dairy Queen stand in Gastonia, North Carolina

Prior to the automobile era, most ice cream was consumed in sit-down parlors and soda shops. However, widespread adoption of automobiles and road construction in the United States stimulated the development of small roadside stands. Having developed a high-butterfat ice cream in 1925, Howard Deering Johnson experienced success selling it in ice cream stands around Boston-area beaches and roads before focusing on franchising his full-service Howard Johnson's restaurants, using the orange paint motif from the ice cream stands in the restaurant design. The first Dairy Queen opened in Illinois with then-new soft serve in 1940, and began a rapid expansion after the end of war-era rationing, reaching 2,500 independently owned franchised stands by 1953. The architectural model used by Dairy Queen was adapted by Tastee-Freez, which grew to 600 stands, along with other franchised brands like Frostop. Dairy Queen later moved away from a seasonal ice cream stand model with the addition of a hot food grill menu and indoor restaurants that operated year-round.

Carvel began selling ice cream in 1934 in the New York City area and likewise grew to several hundred stands by the early 1950s. Its standard design for a 20-foot (6.1 m) by 30-foot (9.1 m) stand—a wall of windows canted forward toward the street with a flat shed roof angled upward toward the street—was copied by others, including brands like Tastee-Freez and independent operators, becoming an architectural standard for ice cream stands in the middle of the 20th century. The growth in ice cream stands was in part due to the lack of formal rules imposed on diners in sit-down parlors, where children were expected to sit still; at outdoor stands, children could run around and teenagers could experience fewer restrictions on their behavior, while parents did not feel an obligation to enforce behavior.

While there were several smaller chains of stands, the vast majority were independently owned and operated due to the inexpensive construction and relative simplicity of operation. Ice cream stands focused on soft serve, in contrast with parlors' focus on hard ice cream, and stand operators often mixed their own instead of relying on suppliers. By the late 20th century, ice cream and fast food chains had largely abandoned free-standing walk-up ice cream stands, leaving most of them not only independently operated but also independently branded.

== Architecture ==
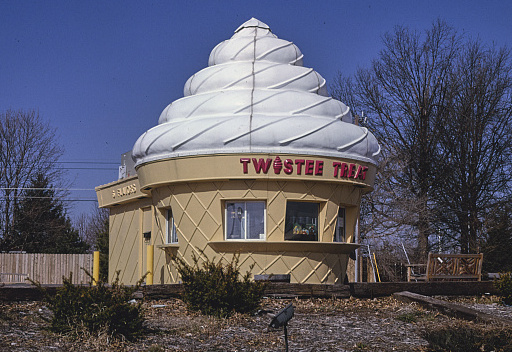
An example of novelty architecture in the ice cream stand chain Twistee Treat in St. Joseph, Missouri

Ice cream stands are typically small and boxy buildings with a decorated and angular façade, one or two counters for ordering and no indoor customer seating. A characteristic design of mid-20th-century ice cream stands—to the extent that the form has become uniquely identified with the type of business—was a structure with canted walls, glass fronts and sides, a projecting shed roof and a prominent sign. The design was based on the template created by Carvel for its franchised locations but was widely copied and adapted by independent stands. Typical examples include Custard's Last Stand in Long Lake, New York, which won an award for from Adirondack Architectural Heritage for preservation.

Ice cream stands often employed novelty architecture—such as large-scale ice cream cartons, hand-cranked freezers, or upturned waffle cones—to attract customers. Bold signage that was not suited to Main Street ice cream parlors and soda fountains was common at highway-side ice cream stand locales.

== Geographic distribution ==
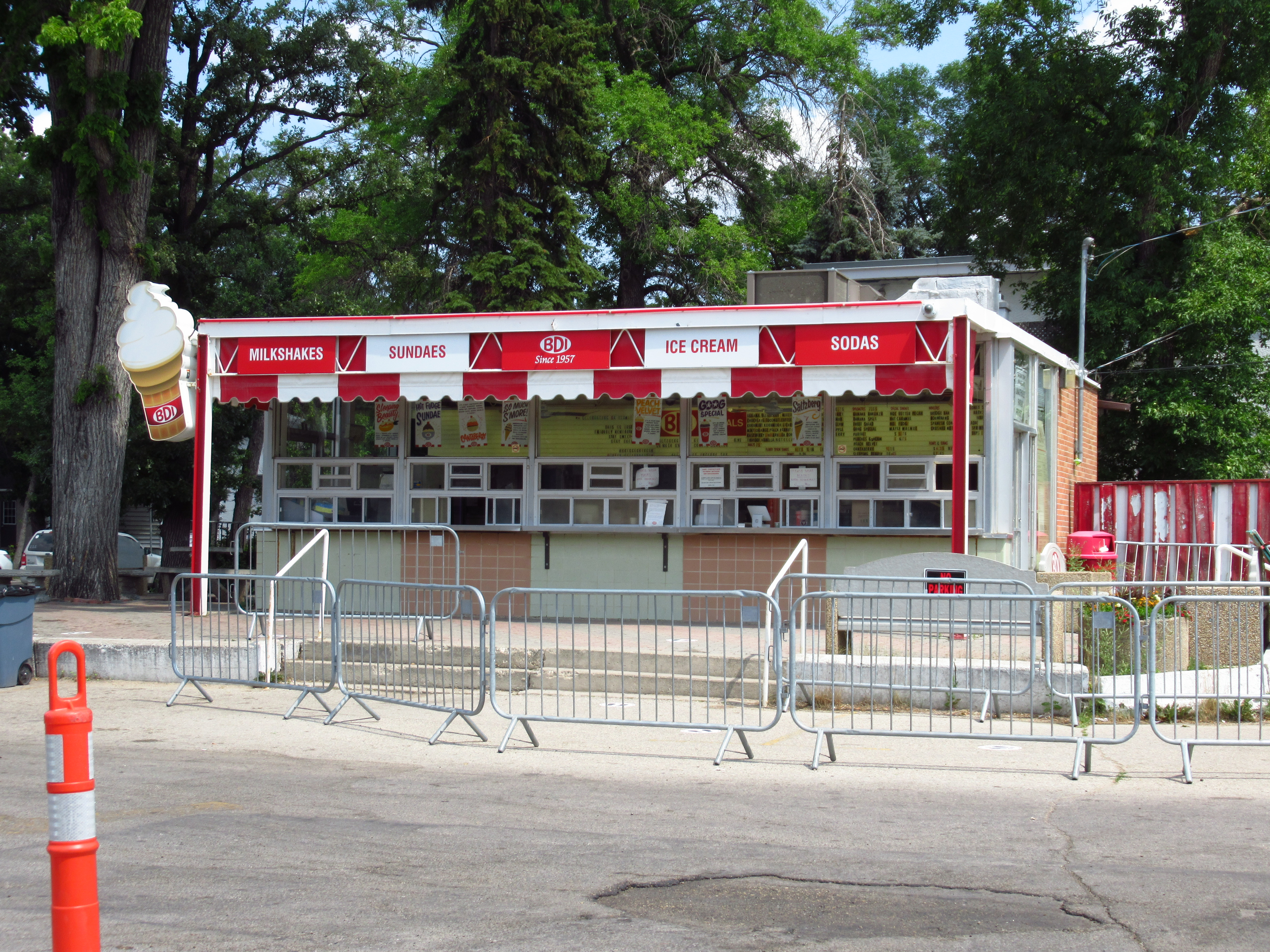
The Bridge Drive-In in Winnipeg, Manitoba, in 2021

While ice cream parlors are popular around the world, ice cream stands tended to be found in the United States. The stands' outdoor seating areas tended to concentrate them in regions where summer weather and temperatures are comfortable, such as the Midwestern and Northeastern United States, and they almost always operate seasonally. The stands are popular in vacation areas such as the Adirondack Mountains, New England, and the Midwest (in particular the Upper Midwest, Ohio, and Indiana).
