= Nancy M. Johnson =

American inventor (1794–1890)

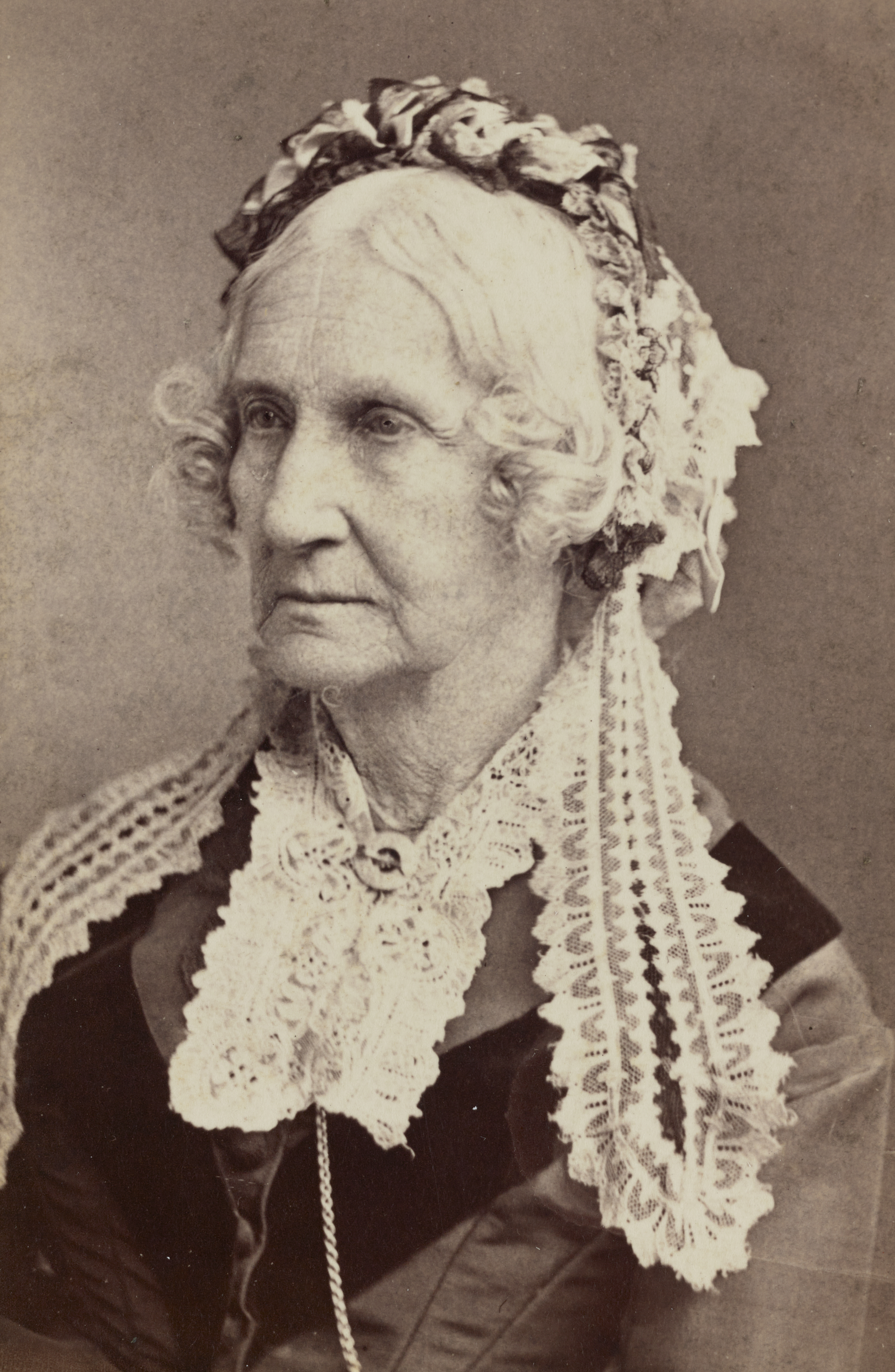
- Portrait of Johnson, c. 1875
- Born: Nancy Maria Donaldson; December 28, 1794; New York, U.S.
- Died: April 22, 1890 (aged 95); Washington, D.C., U.S.
- Resting place: Oak Hill Cemetery; Washington, D.C., U.S.
- Occupation: Inventor
- Known for: Patenting the hand-cranked ice cream freezer
- Spouse: Walter Rogers Johnson (m. 1823; died 1852)
- Children: 2

Nancy Maria Johnson (née Donaldson; December 28, 1794 – April 22, 1890) was an American inventor best known for patenting the first hand-cranked ice cream freezer in 1843. Her invention transformed ice cream production from a labor-intensive process into a more efficient and accessible practice, helping to shift the dessert from a luxury item to a widely consumed product.

== Early life and background ==
Johnson was born Nancy Maria Donaldson in New York in 1794. Little is documented about her early education, reflecting the limited opportunities available to women at the time. She married Walter Rogers Johnson in Medfield, Massachusetts in 1823. Walter Rogers Johnson was a scientist and served as the first secretary of the American Association for the Advancement of Science. The couple adopted two children.

Johnson lived during a time period in which the legal doctrine of coverture heavily restricted married women’s rights. Under this system, women were generally unable to own property independently, manage finances, or enter into any contracts. Despite these constraints, Johnson secured a United States patent, an uncommon and notable achievement for women of her era.

== Invention of the ice cream freezer ==
In the early nineteenth century, ice cream production required extensive manual labor, often involving continuous stirring of a mixture in a container surrounded by ice. This process was time-consuming and limited the dessert’s availability primarily to wealthy households.

In 1843, while living in Philadelphia, Johnson patented her “Artificial Freezer” (U.S. Patent No. 3,254). The device introduced a hand-cranked mechanism that automated the churning process. It consisted of a cylindrical container placed within a wooden tub filled with ice and salt, which lowered the freezing point and enabled rapid cooling. Inside the container, a rotating dasher continuously mixed the contents, producing a smoother texture by preventing the formation of large ice crystals.

By combining mechanical motion with controlled cooling, Johnson’s invention significantly reduced the time and effort required to make ice cream while improving consistency. The design made ice cream production more practical for households and small businesses.

Johnson later sold the rights to her patent for a modest sum. Subsequent improvements by other inventors, including William G. Young, refined the design and expanded its commercial use.

== Impact and legacy ==
Johnson’s invention played a significant role in making ice cream more widely accessible in the United States. By reducing production costs and labor requirements, the hand-cranked freezer contributed to the transition of ice cream from a luxury good to a common dessert.

The fundamental principles of her design—mechanical churning combined with controlled freezing—remain central to modern ice cream production. While contemporary machines use electricity and refrigeration, they continue to rely on variations of the rotating dasher mechanism introduced by Johnson.

Her invention contributed to the growth of a major food industry. In 2019, approximately 6.4 billion pounds of ice cream and frozen yogurt were produced in the United States, supporting tens of thousands of jobs and generating significant economic activity.

== Later life ==
In addition to her work as an inventor, Johnson participated in educational and humanitarian efforts. Beginning in the 1860s, she and her sister taught formerly enslaved individuals in South Carolina as part of the Port Royal Experiment.

Johnson died in Washington, D.C., in 1890 at the age of 95 and was buried at Oak Hill Cemetery.
