= Frostop =

American root beer brand

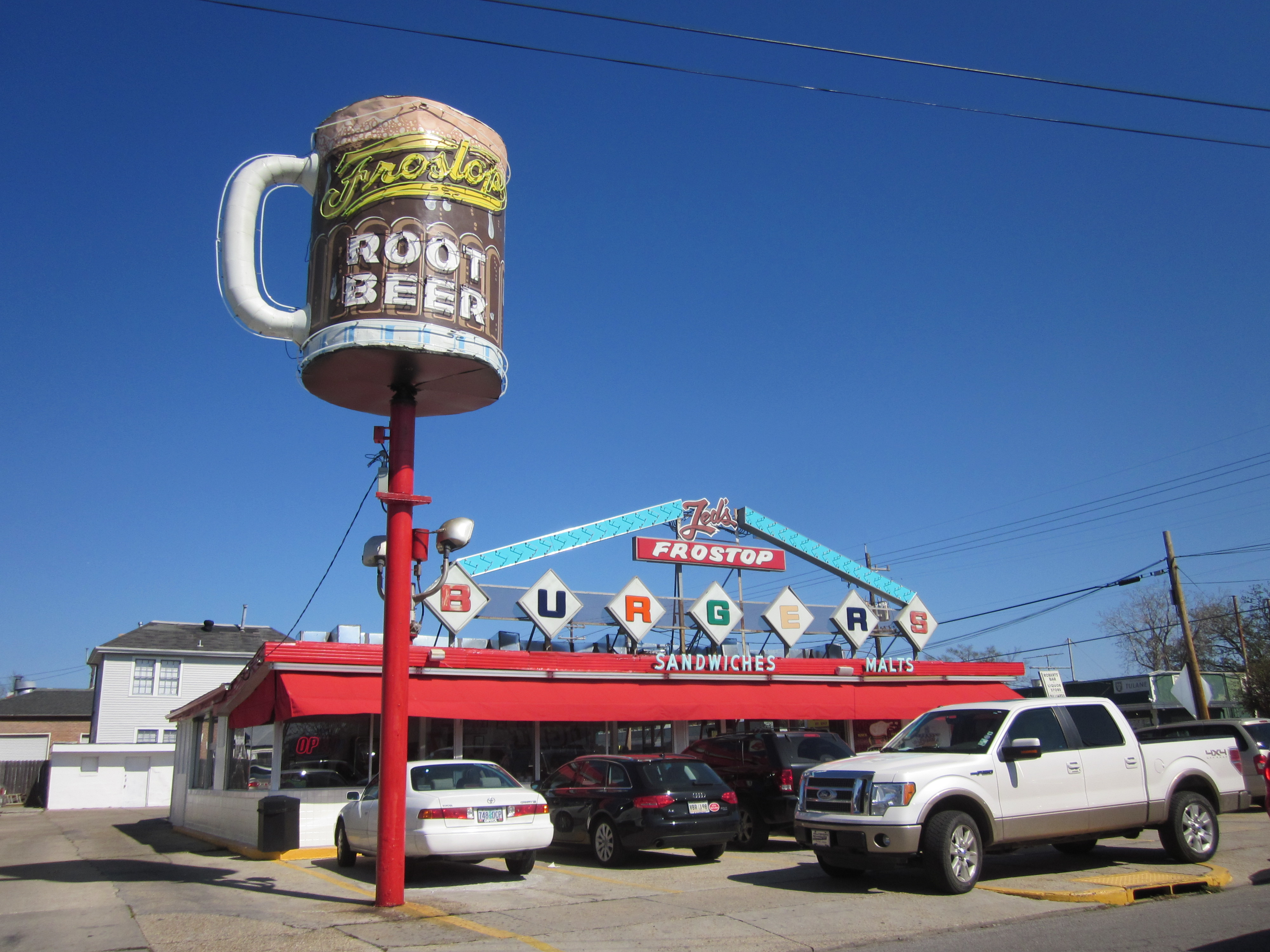
- Frostop restaurant in Uptown New Orleans.
- Type: Subsidiary
- Industry: Soft drink Restaurants
- Genre: Fast Food; Soft drink
- Founded: 1926
- Founder: L.S. Harvey
- Headquarters: Columbus, Ohio, U.S.
- Number of locations: 13 drive-ins
- Products: Soft drinks, Fast food
- Parent: FBG Bottling Group, LLC
- Website: frostop drive-in.com

Frostop is the name of an American root beer brand and chain of fast food drive-in restaurants. The restaurants are known for their rotating oversized root beer mugs used as outdoor signage.

== History ==
The first Frostop root beer stand was opened in 1926 in Springfield, Ohio by L.S. Harvey. A chain of franchise locations was established, with the biggest growth following World War II. The Frostop drive-ins reached their peak in 1958 with locations concentrated mostly in the American midwest and deep south, but found from New York and Florida to California and Washington state.

== Today ==
Frostop brand products—Root Beer, Sarsaparilla, Red Birch Beer, Orange Cream, Black Cherry, and a Vanilla Caramel Cream soda—are still available in supermarkets and convenience stores in Arkansas, California, Colorado, Illinois, Iowa, Idaho, Indiana, Louisiana, Michigan, Minnesota, Mississippi, Missouri, Nebraska, Nevada, Ohio, Oregon, Pennsylvania, Tennessee, Utah, Washington, West Virginia and Wisconsin. Although not as numerous as they were in the 1950s and 1960s, Frostop drive-in franchises can still be found scattered across America.
