= Ice cream cart =

Food vending vehicle

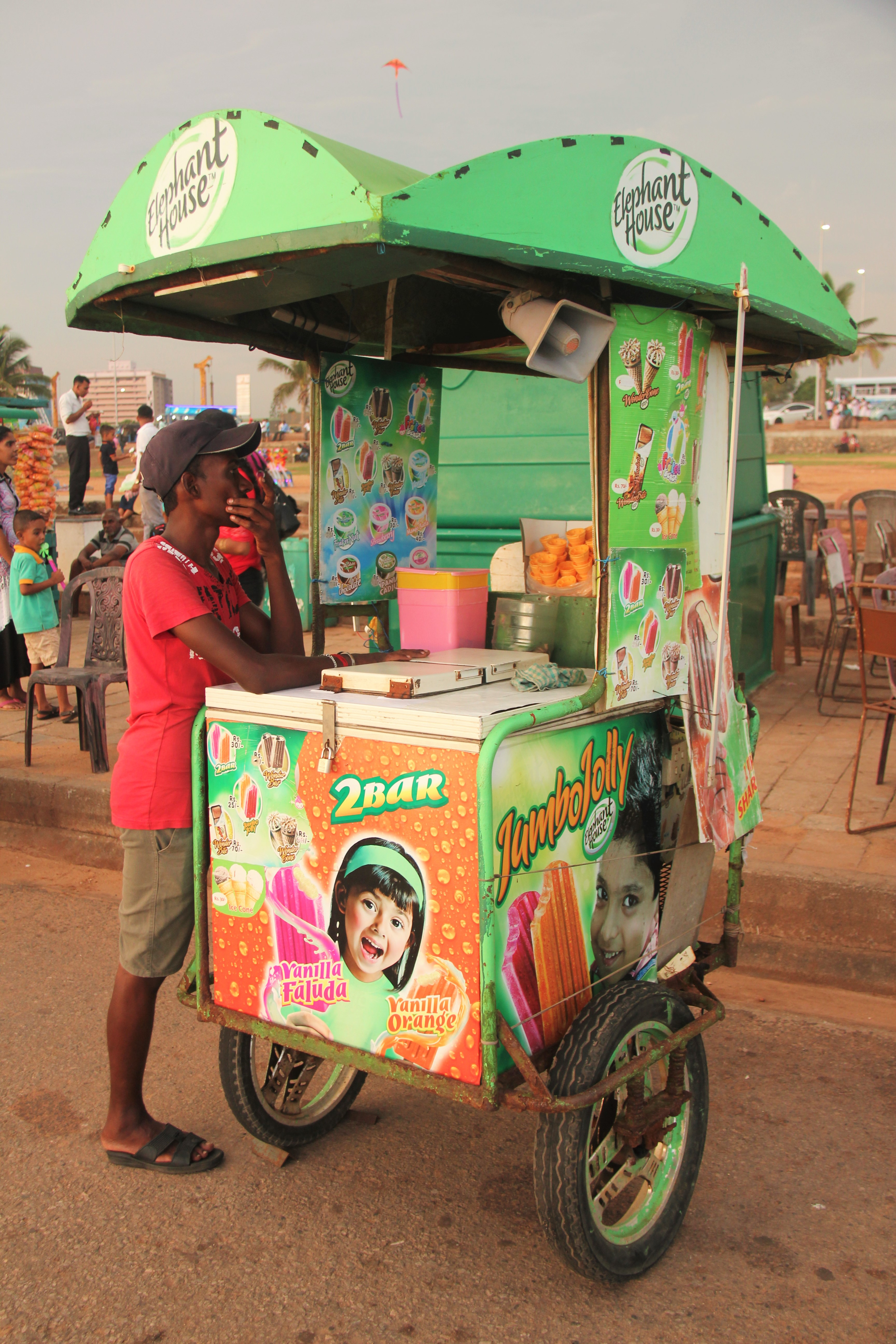
Ice Cream cart at Galle Face Green, Colombo, Sri Lanka.

An ice cream cart (or ice cream stall) is a mobile commercial vehicle that sells ice cream as a retail outlet. The ice cream cart is usually used during the summer and is generally spotted at public space, parks, beaches, schools or drive through neighborhoods (residential areas). Sometimes a bicycle or motorcycle is attached to the cart, in order to improve its mobility.

Ice cream carts are mostly popular throughout the developing world such as Southeast Asia, Africa, and Latin America. In the Western world, they are much less common, with larger ice cream vans often taking the primary role of mobile ice cream vendors.

== Around the World ==
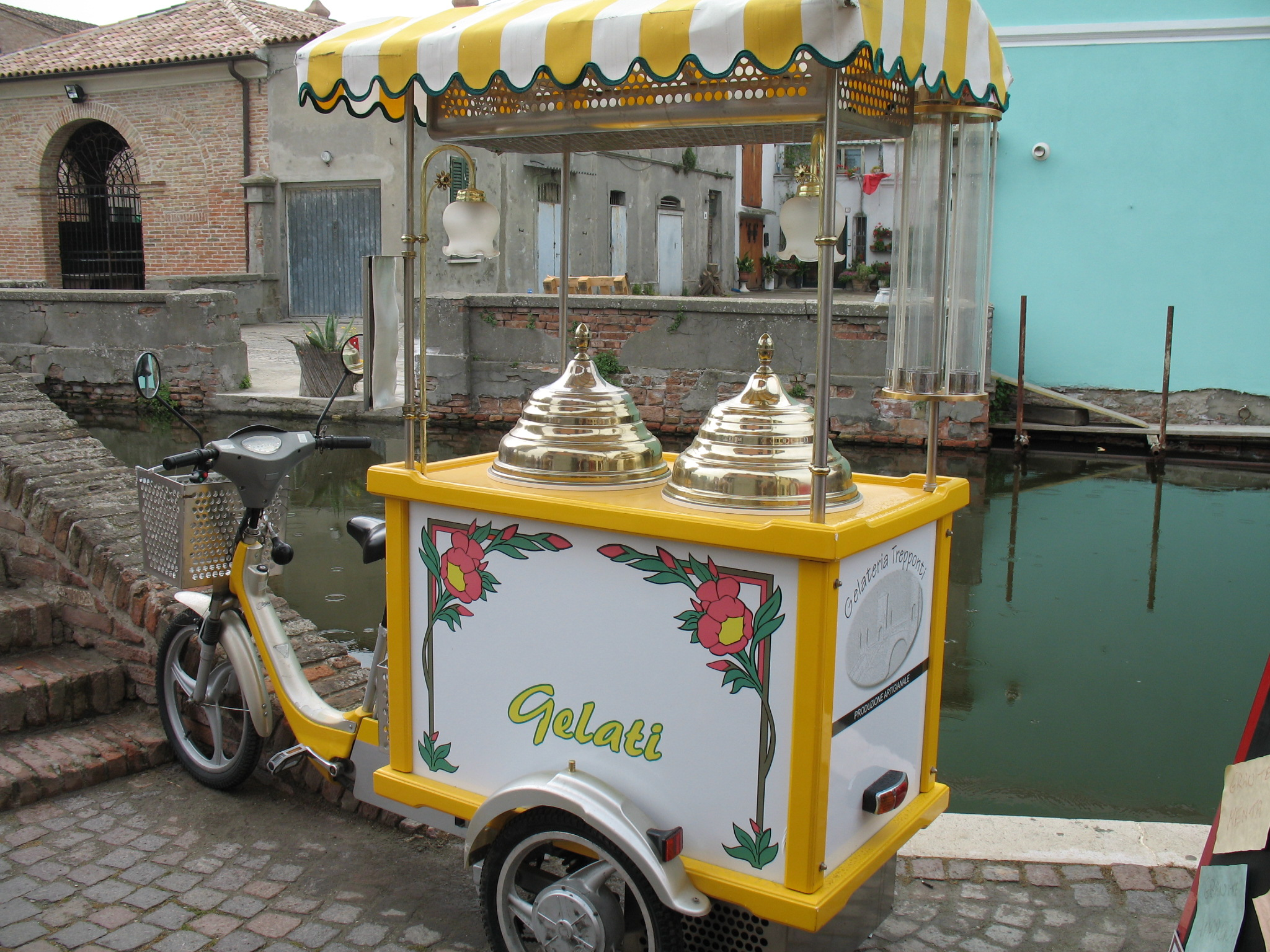
An ice cream bike in Comacchio, Emilia Romagna, Italy

=== Singapore ===
These are available in three forms: it can be served in a cup, sandwiched in a folded slice of bread – pandan or rainbow bread – or between two thin wafer biscuits.

The ice cream flavours that are usually sold are: chocolate chip, durian, raspberry ripple, chocolate, yam, mango, red bean and sweet corn. Other flavours include blueberry, mocha chip, peppermint chocolate chip, nata de coco, matcha, strawberry, cheese, caramel, avocado, cappuccino and more. Beyond ice cream, ice cream carts sometimes also sell popsicles.

The carts are run by Singapore's pioneer generation and they are generally found in crowded public areas such as the outside of The Cathay and many spots along Orchard Road and Bugis.

=== Philippines ===
- Sorbetero

== See also ==
- Ice cream van
