= Rotisserie chicken =

Chicken dish

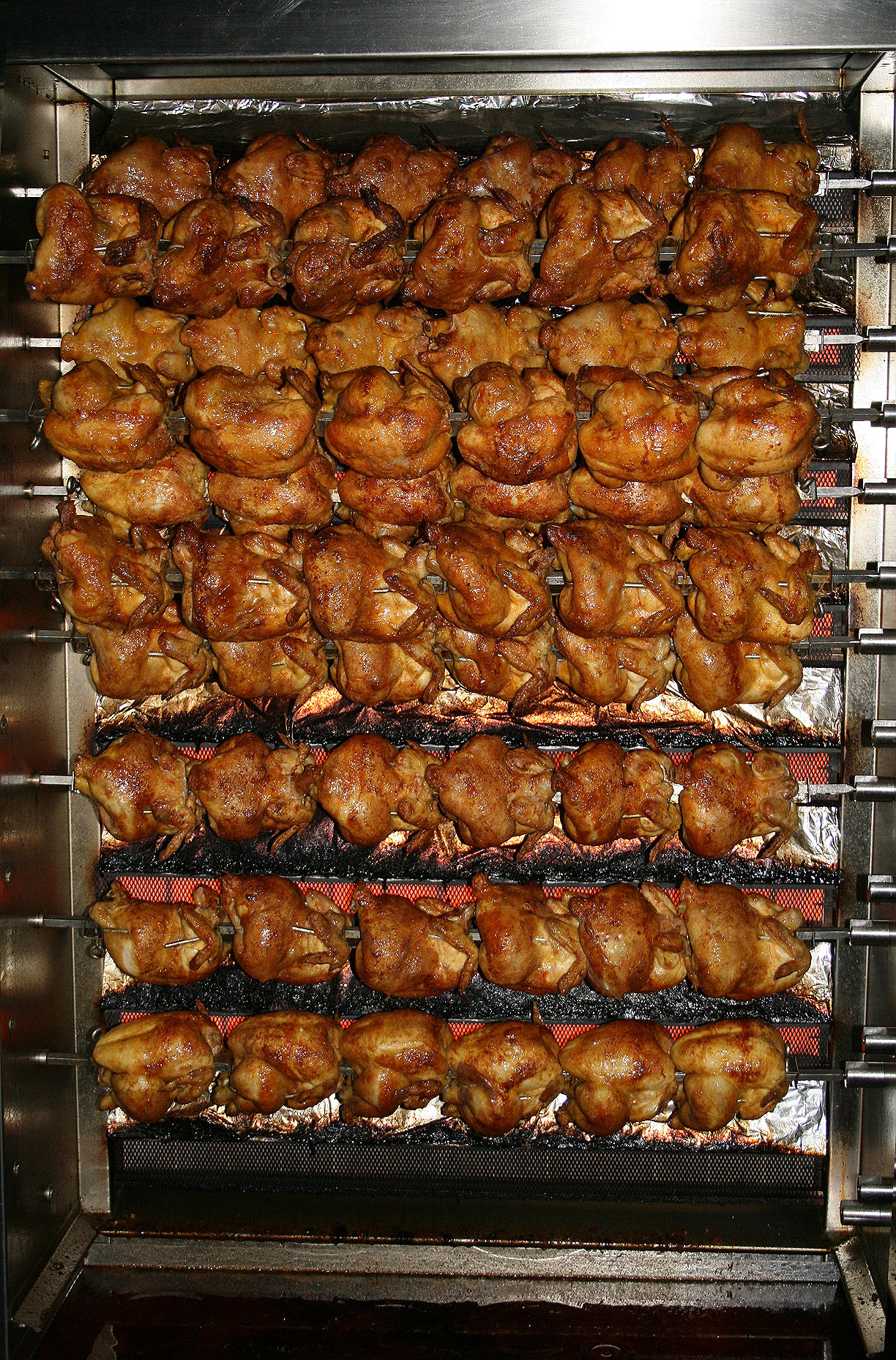
Rotisserie chicken

Rotisserie chicken is a chicken dish that is cooked on a rotisserie by using direct heat in which the chicken is placed next to the heat source.

Electric- or gas-powered heating elements may be used by using adjustable infrared heat. These types of rotisseries have proven quite functional for cooking rotisserie-style chicken. Leftover rotisserie chicken may be used in a variety of dishes such as soup, chicken salad, and sandwiches.

== Grocery loss leader ==
Rotisserie chickens are often sold at a lower price than raw whole chickens in grocery stores. Two explanations are often given to justify this phenomenon. First, some grocery stores may use rotisserie chickens as loss leaders to bring shoppers into the store. The logic behind this theory is that if customers come to a store for its rotisserie chickens, they will buy other products while they are there, as well, particularly higher-margin side dishes and alcoholic beverages to accompany the chicken. Second, rotisserie chickens are often made with poultry that is about to reach its "best by" date and would otherwise have to be destroyed unsold. By cooking and selling the chickens, the grocery stores are able to recoup some of their expenditures.

== By region ==
=== Australia ===
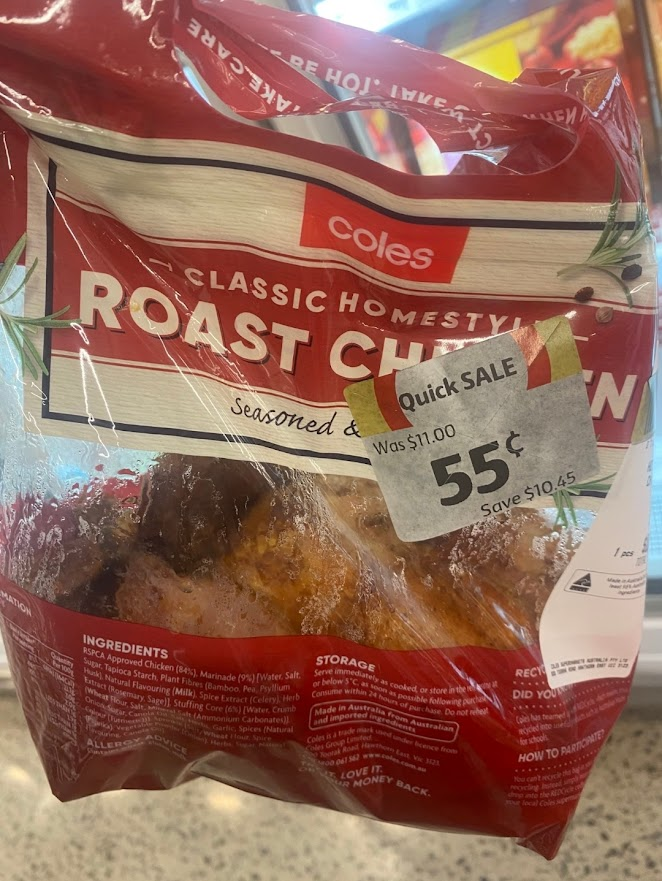
A rotisserie chicken on sale at Coles in Australia

Three major supermarket chains in Australia, Coles, IGA and Woolworths, along with the Australian outlets of the American chain Costco, sell rotisserie chicken. When packaged in a disposable plastic carry bag with a handle, a whole roast chicken purchased hot from an Australian supermarket is referred to by the slang expression "bachelor's handbag", which was the "people's choice" as the country's word [sic] of the year for 2022. Such a product requires no further preparation before being consumed, and is thus seen as an easy meal for a single person.. They are also known as "Tradie's Handbag" due to their popularity on worksites. Multiple functional roast chicken themed handbag designs have been sold as a play on this nickname including by Woolworths themselves.

The meat is the key ingredient of the classic sandwich knowns as a "Hot Chook Roll" if in a roll or "Hot Chook Sanga" if between sliced bread. Typically the sandwich is buttered or spread with stuffing and incorporates prepackaged supermarket salads such as coleslaw, potato salad or tabouli alongside potential additions such as sliced tasty cheese, onion or tomato.

To comply with the Safe Food Australia guidelines for hot food published by Food Standards Australia New Zealand, supermarkets in Australia remove any unsold hot rotisserie chicken from sale after it has been on the shelves for four hours. At Coles, the chicken is then shredded and marketed in the refrigerated deli section as "shredded chicken". Woolworths follows a similar approach. Costco places unsold hot chicken into a blast chiller, and then sells it as a refrigerated product at a reduced price.

Since the 1950s, many family-run takeaway shops in Australia's suburbs have sold meals based on charcoal chicken, a variety of the rotisserie product cooked above charcoal. In some cases, immigrant proprietors also offered further variations such as Greek-style lemon and oregano chicken, Italian salads, and later Portuguese marinades and Lebanese sides. By the late 1970s, charcoal chicken shops had become a suburban staple.

In Australia, charcoal chicken has broad appeal, including amongst older and younger people sensitive to strong flavours. From the late 1980s, chains such as Oporto and Frango emerged as competitors to the family-run charcoal chicken shops.

As of 2025, another chain, Chargrill Charlie’s, founded by two South African families in Coogee, Sydney, in 1989, had nearly 30 outlets across Sydney and Melbourne, and a store in Brisbane. At the end of that year, an even bigger chain, El Jannah, founded in the Sydney suburb of Granville in 1998, had 50 stores across New South Wales, Victoria and the Australian Capital Territory.

Previously, in the early 1970s, a more American-style fast food chain selling roast chicken, Red Rooster, was founded in Perth. Its menu was initially based on rotisserie chicken. Between about the mid-1980s and 1995, the chain replaced its rotisserie ovens with combi ovens, which reduced the cook time from 1½ hours to 55 minutes. Despite that change, Red Rooster, now a national chain, continues to sell "rotisserie-style chicken".

=== Canada ===
Rotisserie chicken has been a popular food in Canada since the 1950s, and is a staple of Canadian pop culture.

Two Canadian casual dining restaurant chains, Swiss Chalet and St-Hubert, dominate the market for chicken, though the dish is also the central item for other Canadian chains, popular international chains such as Nandos, or individual restaurants. Swiss Chalet owns a cable channel that exclusively airs content related to rotisserie chicken, "twenty-four hours a day, seven days a week." It typically airs chickens rotating on a rotisserie. Occasionally, a dancing man appears wearing a costume that looks "like a container of Swiss Chalet's dipping sauce."

Most Canadian supermarket chains (including Costco) sell rotisserie chicken as a loss leader, similar to supermarkets in the United States.

=== France ===
Napoleon Bonaparte was a frequent consumer of rotisserie chickens.

=== Mexico ===
In Mexico, rotisserie chicken is called "pollo rostizado" (which literally means "roasted chicken"). Rotisserie chicken is often sold at restaurants specializing in rotisserie chicken and is eaten with tortillas, salsa, and sides of arroz rojo and refried beans; it can also be found at supermarkets or warehouse clubs such as Costco or Sam's Club, similar to supermarkets in the United States. "Pollo asado" ("grilled chicken") is also popular.

=== Peru ===
Pollo a la brasa (literally "roasted chicken") is a national dish, with Peruvians consuming it an average of three times per month and with rotisserie chicken restaurants accounting for 40% of the fast food industry in the country.

=== United Kingdom ===
In 2025, the supermarket Morrisons lost a legal challenge over whether VAT should be charged on its rotisserie chickens. On 17 December 2025, a tribunal judge said HM Revenue and Customs had not ruled the chickens to be zero-rated for VAT and Morrisons failed to disclose key facts about special packaging it used to control the meat's temperature. In 2012, the government had tried to simplify the tax treatment of hot takewaway food, a proposal which was known as the pasty tax.

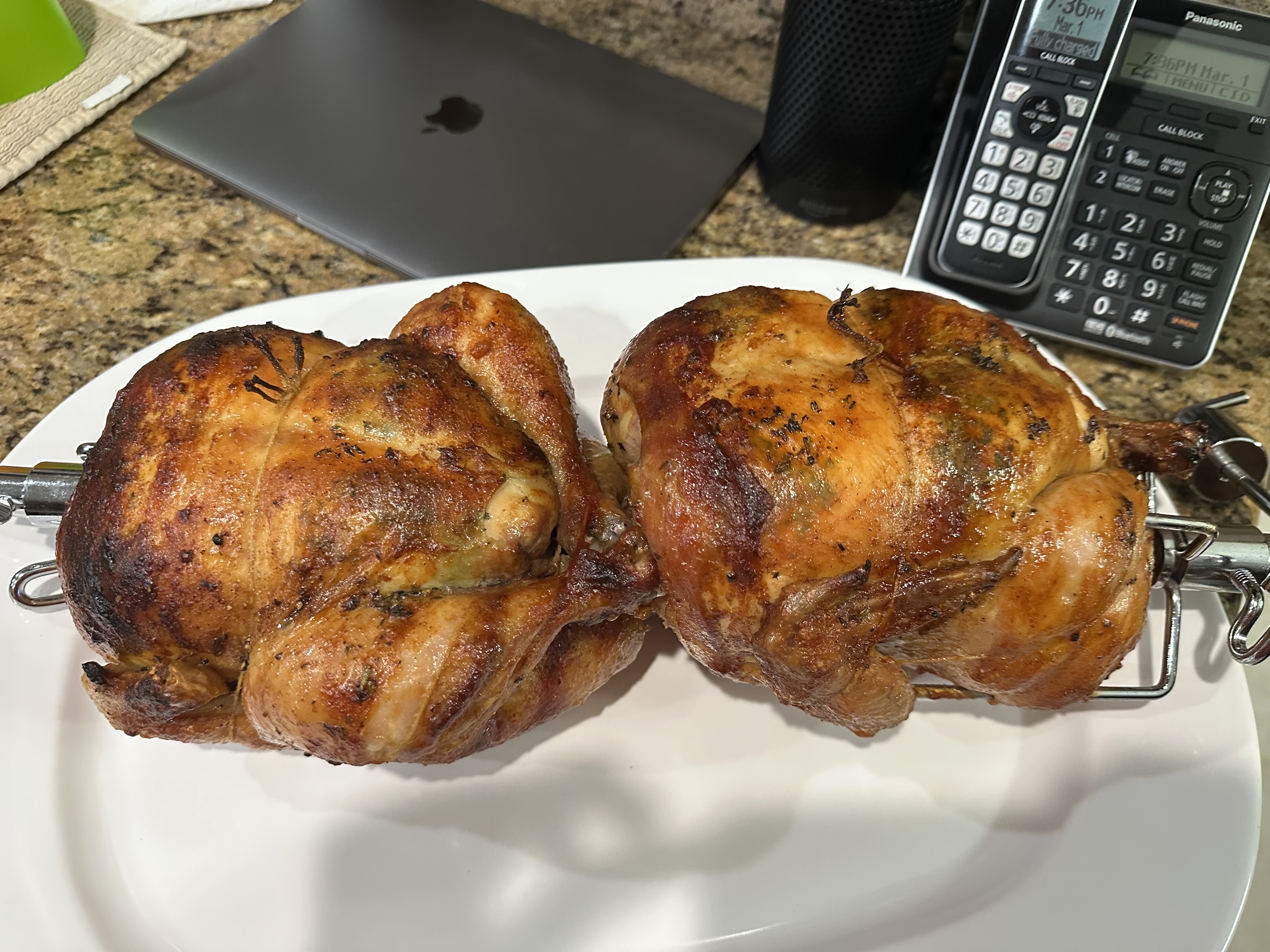
Homemade rotisserie chicken from a propane grill in the United States

=== United States ===
In the United States, ready-to-eat rotisserie chickens were available in supermarkets and some butcher shops during much of the twentieth century. However, they did not become a widely available option for consumers until the early 1990s, when Boston Market helped popularize the selling of packaged rotisserie chickens.

Rotisserie chickens are now highly popular. In 2010, 600 million rotisserie-cooked chickens were purchased by consumers "in U.S. supermarkets, club stores and similar retail outlets". In 2018, over 900 million rotisserie chickens were sold by foodservice outlets and retail stores.

In the U.S., chickens used for rotisserie cooking may be injected with brine to retain moisture. Additional ingredients may be used to add flavor and to brown the chicken, such as oleoresin, yeast extract, sodium tripolyphosphate, and natural flavorings.

Most American large supermarkets (including Costco and Sam's Club) sell rotisserie chicken as a loss leader.

==== Costco and rotisserie chickens ====
Rotisserie chickens being packaged at a Costco store in Citrus Heights, California

Costco is one of the largest producers and vendors of rotisserie chickens in the United States, with one commentator describing it as "the undisputed king of rotisserie chickens". In 2017, Costco sold approximately 87 million rotisserie chickens in the United States. That number rose to 106 million chickens in 2021. Costco's CFO, Richard Galanti, has repeatedly rebuffed suggestions that Costco might eventually increase the cost of its chickens above $4.99, which has been the price of a Costco rotisserie chicken since 2009.

In 2017, Costco broke ground on a new 414-acre facility in Fremont, Nebraska designed to include a hatchery, feed mill, and processing plant. The facility – which is expected to produce around 100 million chickens per year, or roughly 40 percent of Costco's needs – has been reported as costing between $275 million and $400 million. The plant opened in 2019, and is operating as Lincoln Premium Poultry.

In 2024, CEO Ron Vachris reiterated how Costco has gone to "great lengths" to maintain the prices of its hot dog combo and rotisserie chicken, and promised that raising those prices would not happen on his watch.

==== Internet celebrities ====
In 2022, Alexander Tominsky, a waiter in Philadelphia, became a local celebrity after eating a rotisserie chicken every day for 40 consecutive days.

Also in 2022, Spanish-speaking TikTok user @donpollo2982 gained notoriety in June after sharing videos of him eating food in his car, usually rotisserie chicken, while often being interrupted by sounds emitted from his Android smartphone.

== Gallery ==
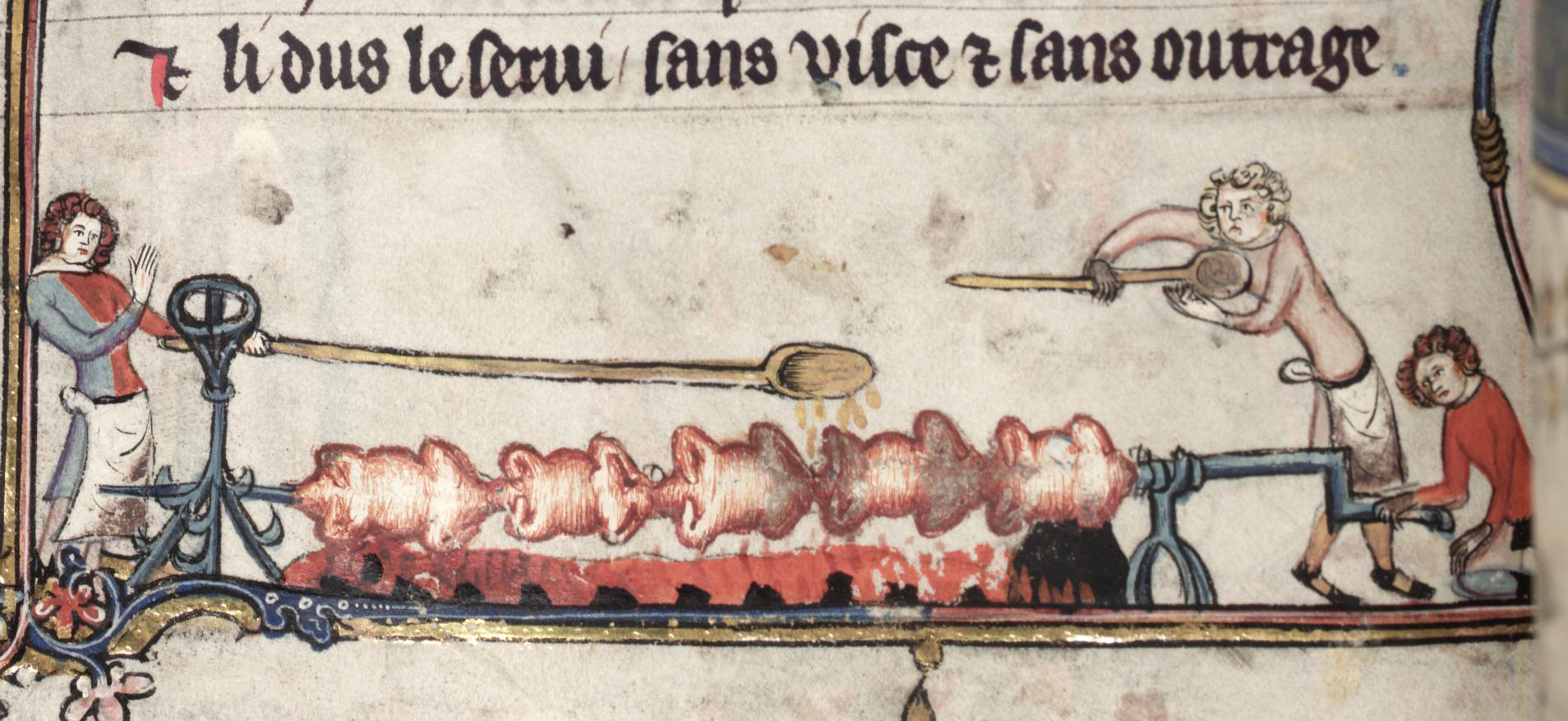
Chickens being roasted on a spit. Romance of Alexander, Bruges, 1338-44 (The Bodleian Library, Oxford, MS 264 fol 170v)

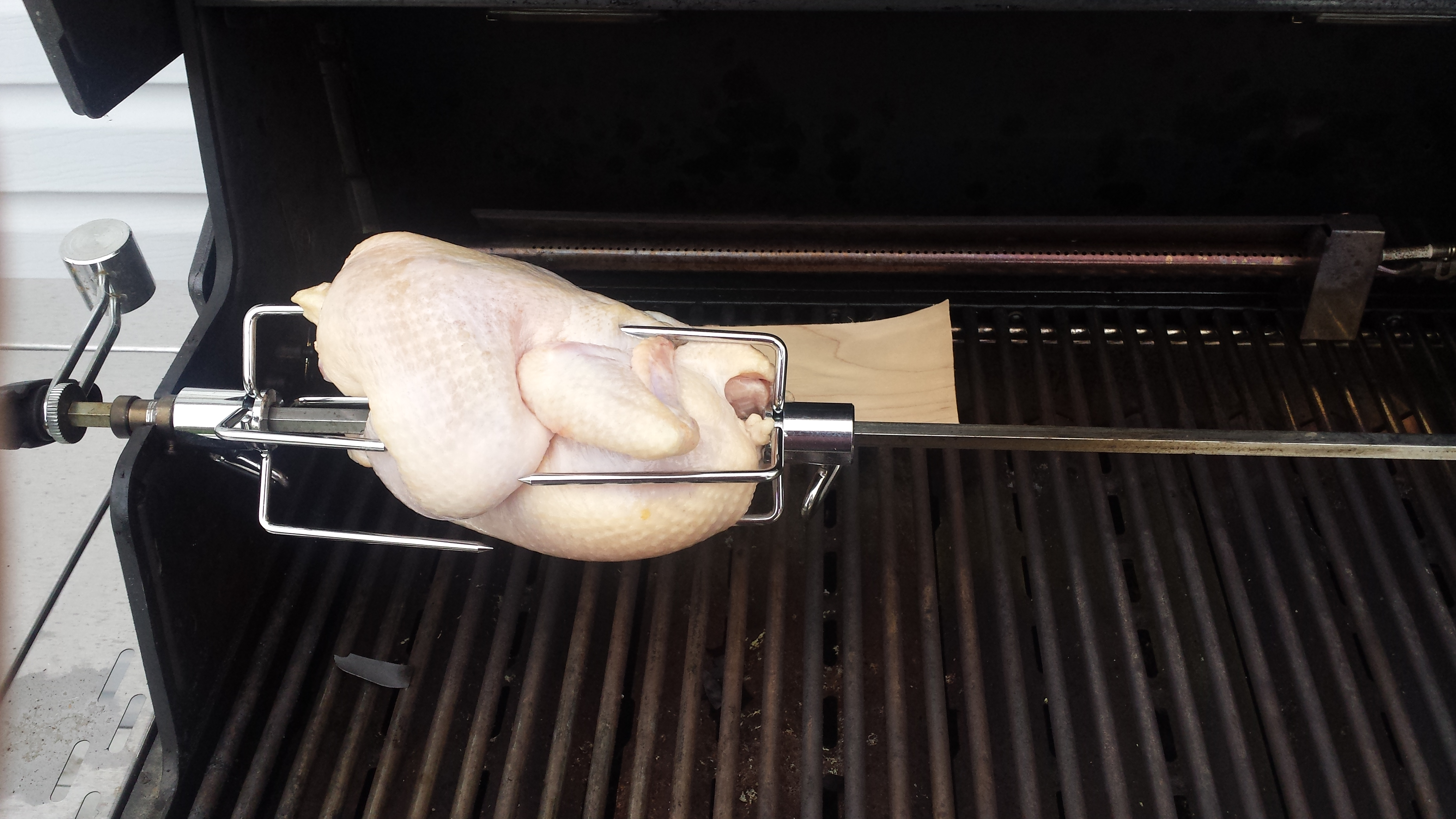
Rotisserie chicken prepped for cooking on a barbecue grill

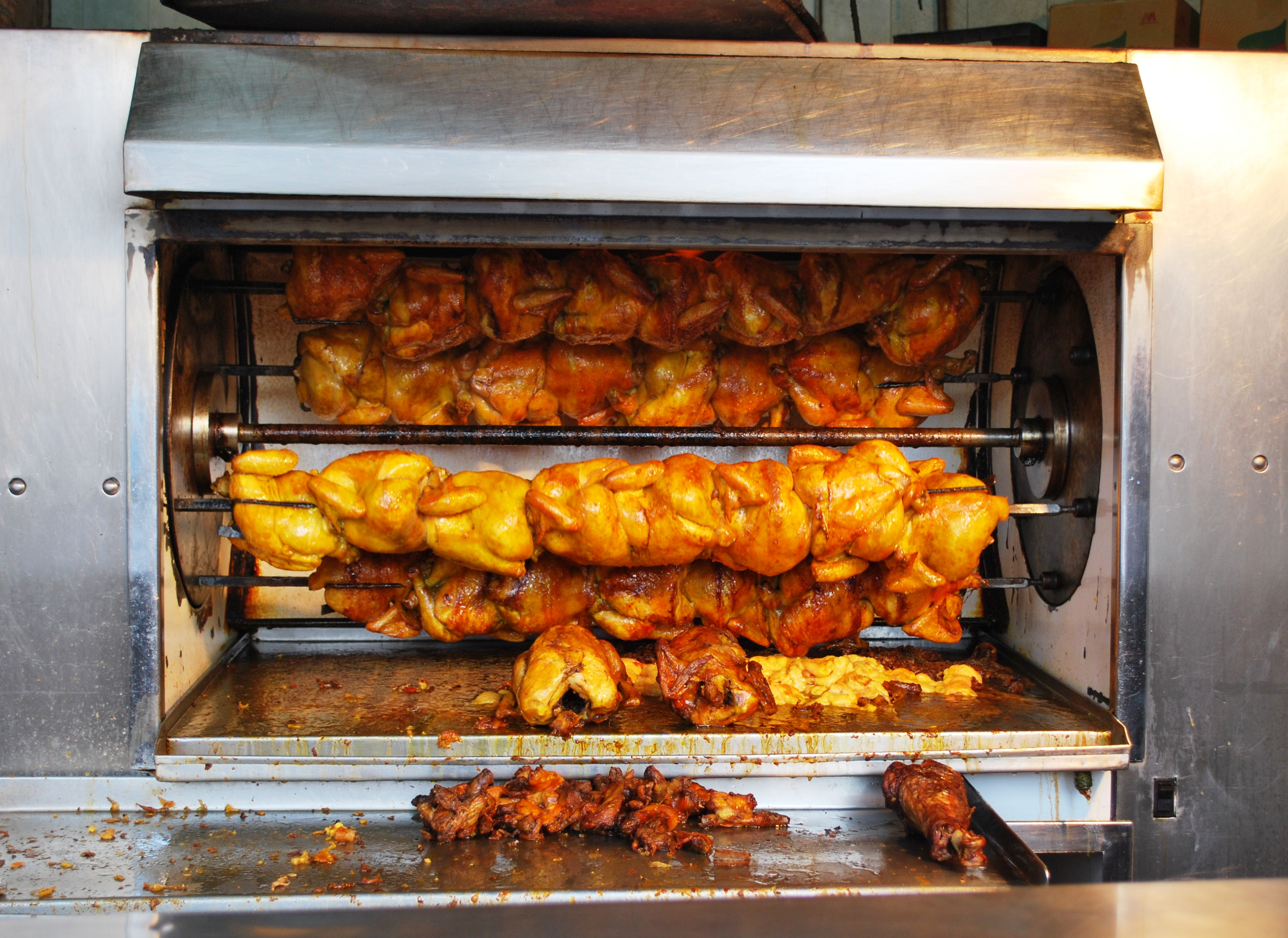
Rotisserie chicken (pollo rostizado) cooking at a take-out shop in the Obrera neighborhood of Mexico City

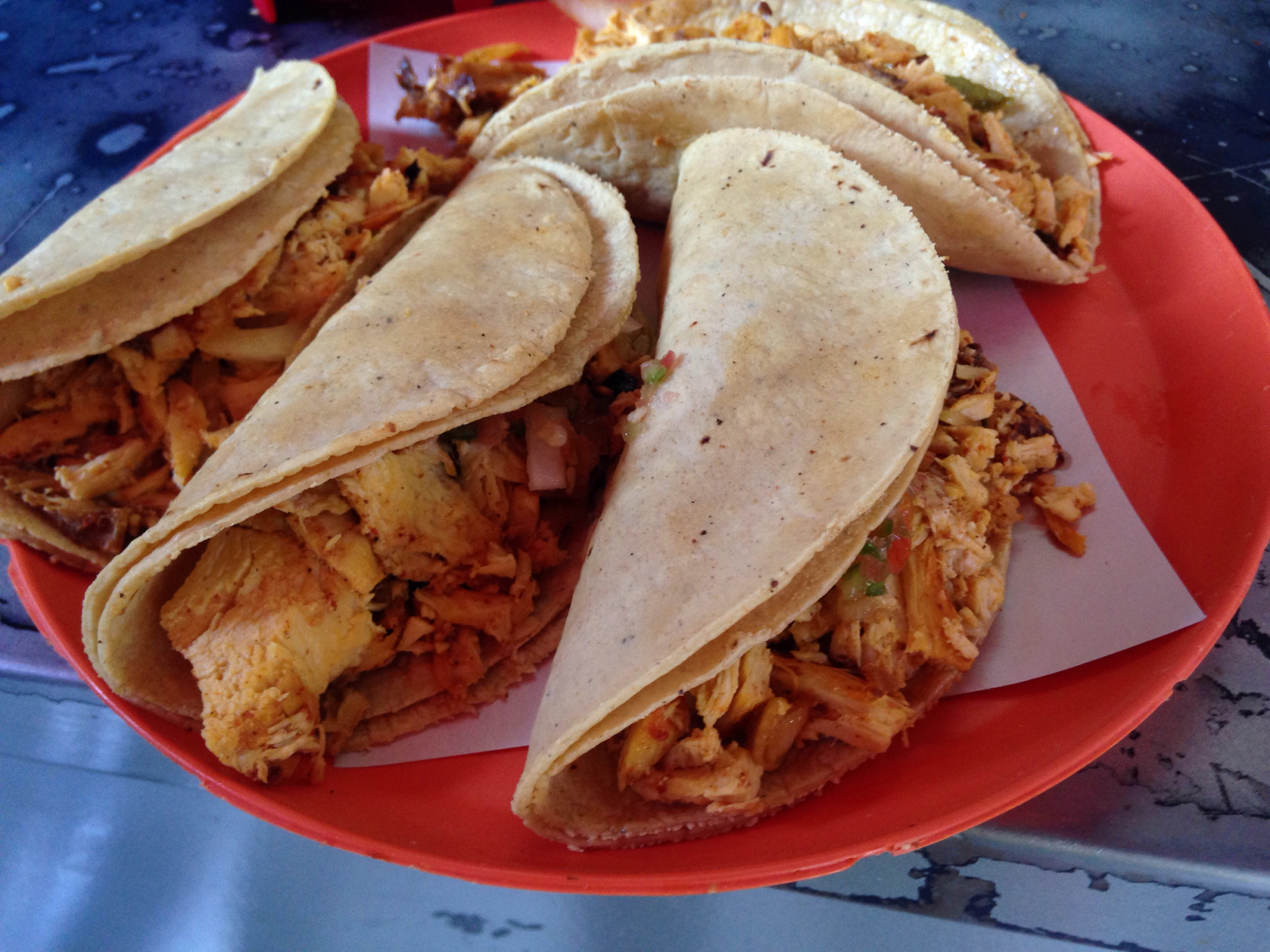
Roast chicken tacos, colonia Condesa, Mexico City

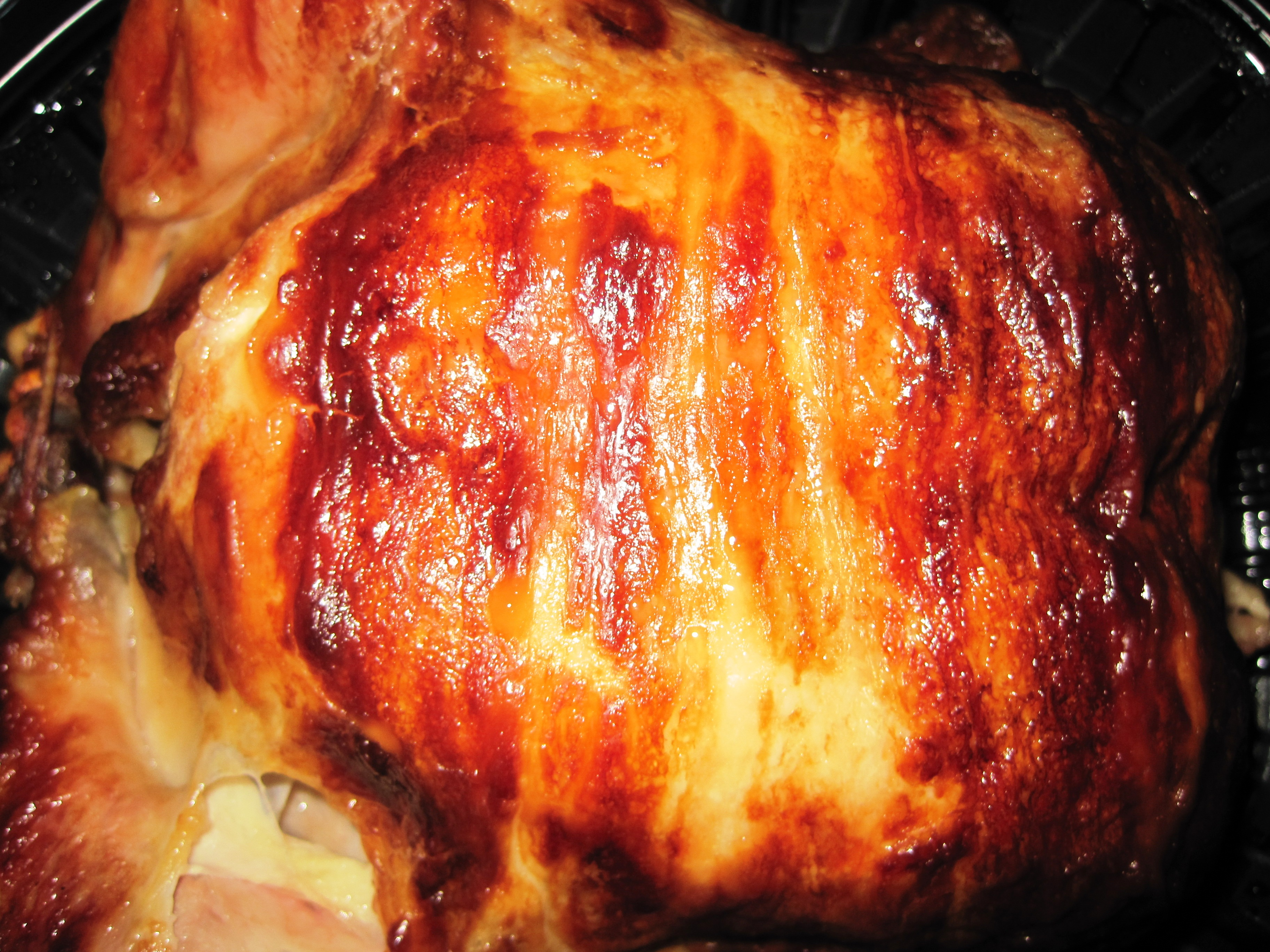
A Costco rotisserie chicken

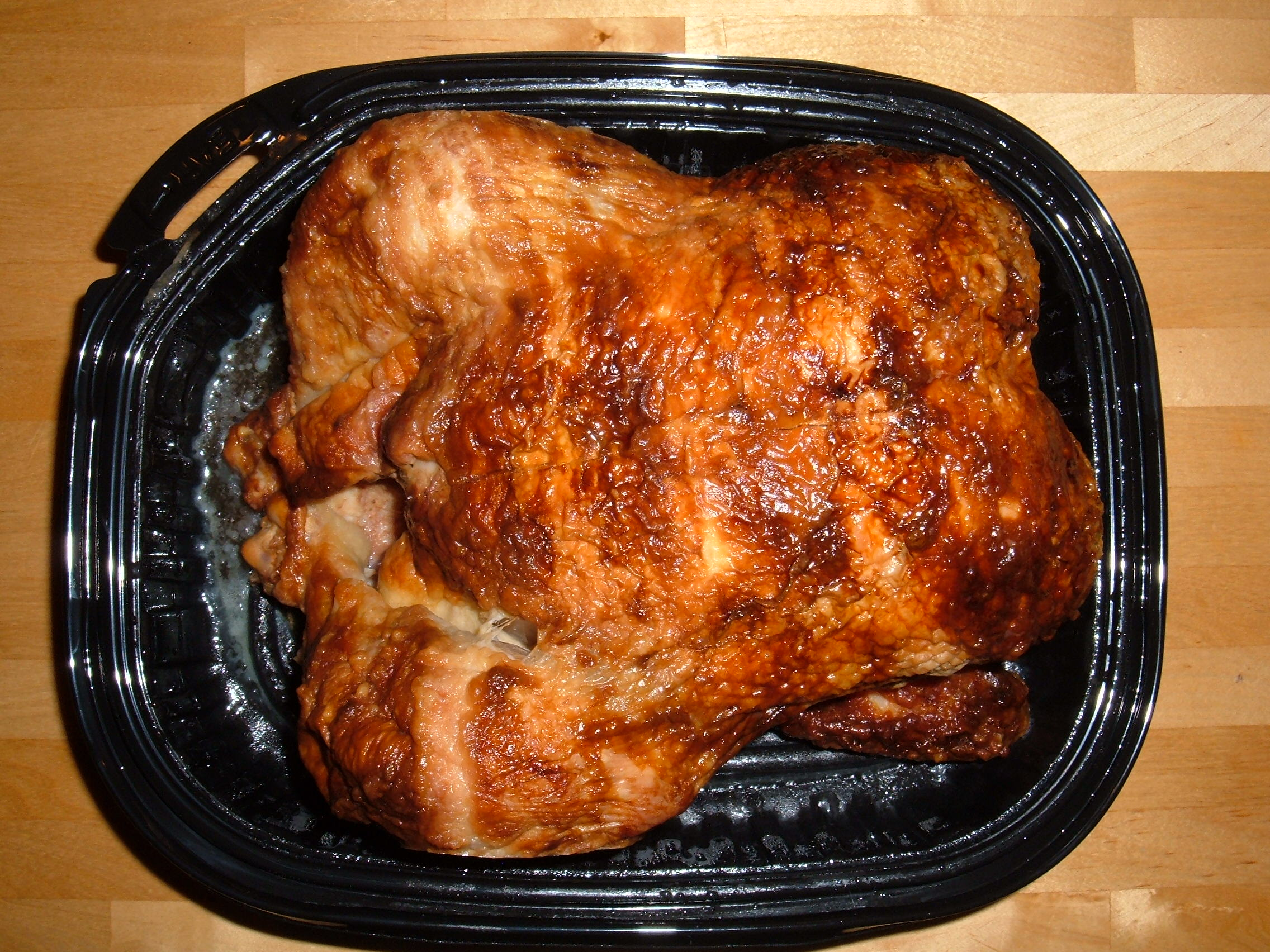
A packaged rotisserie chicken

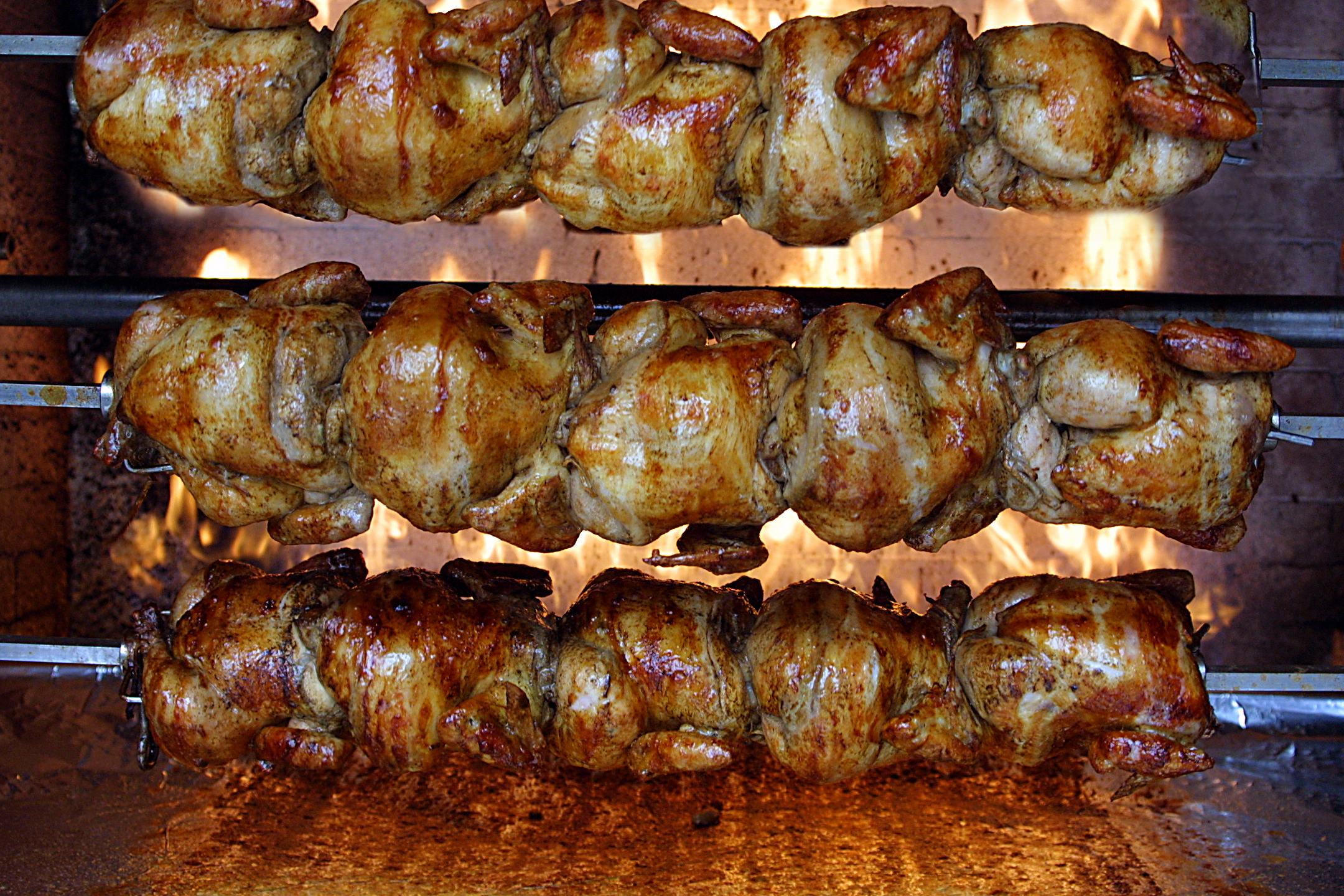
Rotisserie chicken being cooked at a restaurant in California

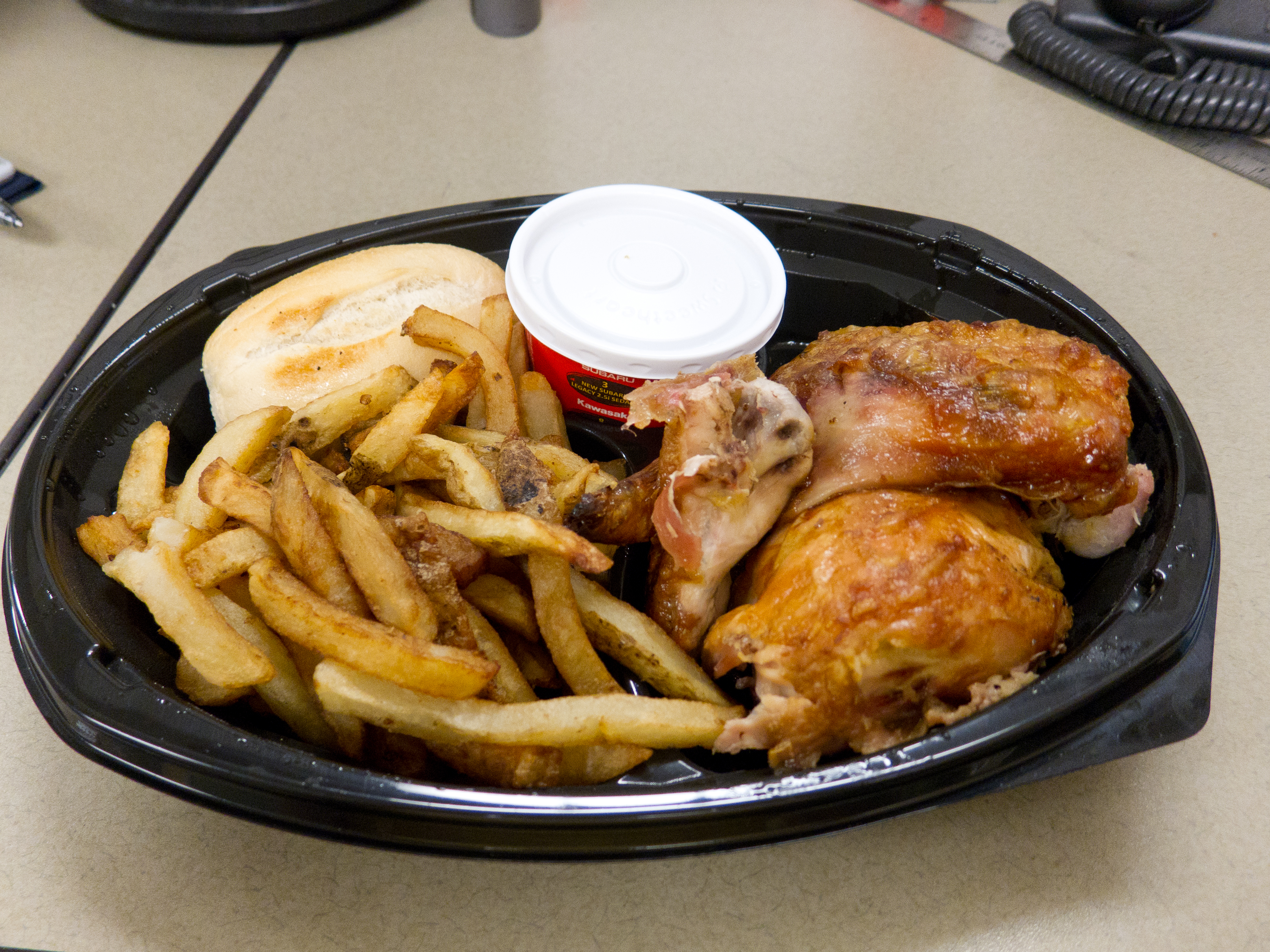
Swiss Chalet 1/2 Chicken dinner ordered as take-out

== See also ==
- Barbecue chicken
- Beer can chicken
- Chicken restaurant
  - List of chicken restaurants
- Huli-huli chicken
- Lechon manok
- List of chicken dishes
- List of spit-roasted foods
- Siu mei
