= Chargrill Charlie's =

Australian restaurant

- Trade name: Chargrill Charlie's
- Type: Subsidiary
- Industry: Chicken restaurants
- Founded: 1989; 37 years ago
- Headquarters: Chatswood, New South Wales, Australia
- Number of locations: 31 (2026)
- Products: Chicken, Salads, Burgers and Rolls
- Parent: PAG Asia Capital through Craveable Brands
- Website: www.chargrillcharlies.com

Chargrill Charlie's is an Australian restaurant chain founded in 1989 that specialises in Home-style cooking chicken, burgers and salads. It is primarily operated by franchisee's, with the master franchisor being PAG Asia Capital a Chinese private equity company, that also owns the Red Rooster, Oporto and Chicken Treat brands.

== History ==
Chargrill Charlie's original store was located at 194–196 Coogee Bay Rd, Coogee, New South Wales 2034.

Chargrill Charlie's has locations throughout Sydney, Melbourne, and Brisbane.

== See also ==
- List of restaurant chains in Australia
- List of chicken restaurants
