= Latte Line =

Socioeconomic dividing line in Sydney, Australia

Representation of the 'Red Rooster Line', with 2026 locations of Red Rooster and Harris Farm Markets stores in Sydney overlying a map of 2021 ABS IRSAD scores. Red indicates the lowest decile of socioeconomic advantage, dark green the highest.

The Latte Line, also known as the Red Rooster Line, is a conceptual socioeconomic divide separating north-east and south-west Sydney. The line, which has historically coincided with the eastern limits of Sydney Red Rooster franchise locations, extends north-west from Sydney Airport, through Parramatta, and is colloquially invoked as an economic and cultural dividing line between Sydney's east and west.

While the 'Red Rooster Line' is often referred to informally, the 'Latte Line' is more typically invoked in discussions of urban planning and housing policy. The line is often seen as a demarcation of class, with the affluent eastern suburbs enjoying broadly improved liveability metrics, often to the exclusion of residents living under the Line. Correspondingly, the Latte Line is a reliable division of socioeconomic advantage, and one's position, either above or below the Line, has ramifications for housing, labour availability, health outcomes and susceptibility to urban heat and climate change.

== Background ==
After the Second World War, Australia, and particularly metropolitan areas such as Sydney, saw rapid urbanisation and expansion. A post-war baby boom, in concert with increased immigration from Southern Europe and the Levant resulted in rising demand for housing and a resultant influx into Western Sydney. Inexpensive housing developments appeared in new suburbs across the west, and urban sprawl westward connected Sydney to Parramatta and Penrith.

Urban growth continued through the 1960s and 1970s, particularly spurred by immigration following the abolition of the White Australia Policy. Vietnamese immigrants, many fleeing the Vietnam War, formed communities in Western Sydney, particularly around Cabramatta. Similarly, the Lebanese Civil War in 1975 drove an influx of Lebanese immigrants to Western Sydney, who overwhelmingly settled in the suburbs of Canterbury, Lidcombe and Bankstown. Over time, a distinct culture emerged in Western Sydney communities. Australians living in and around these suburban immigrant communities developed a distinct 'Western Sydney accent', persisting in the second and third generations, and arising particularly from Italian, Greek and Lebanese ethnolects. Some claim that even today, the accent is regarded with prejudice, as 'unsophisticated' and arising from a 'street identity'. The term 'westie' invoked similar classist overtones. Mediterranean immigrants and their children were often derided with the pejorative 'wog', a term that was reclaimed over time, and became a shared label of immigrant identity and heritage.

Popular culture has correspondingly recognised a socioeconomic divide that has arisen between the 'ethnic' west and the 'affluent' north/east of the city.

== Origin and development ==
The term 'Latte Line' was likely coined by columnist and demographer Bernard Salt as a barb framing the stereotype of affluent, inner-city residents as hipster latte drinkers, a popular sentiment among conservative commentators. Salt is known for favouring similar narratives, gaining notoreity for attributing declining home ownership among millennials to frivolous discretionary spending, such as on 'smashed avo' toast. Salt first used the term in 2011 to describe the westward expansion of Melbourne's middle class, and would refer to it again in subsequent publications. Salt has also referred to a "Goat's Cheese Curtain", reflecting how upmarket cafe locations tend to be confined to the affluent inner-city. The 'Latte Line' term had entered popular parlance by 2012, and became frequently referred to in discussions of public policy. In December 2016, The Sydney Morning Herald reported on the Latte Line, as described by Geoff Roberts, the chief of the Greater Sydney Commission, as representing the east–west divide from the standpoint of labour and housing availability. Unlike the Red Rooster example, the term 'Latte Line' does not refer to any particular data correlation, i.e. with resident drinking habits.

The term 'Red Rooster Line' was coined on Twitter by user 'Big Jez' in February 2016. Moreso than a division of class, Big Jez framed the 'Red Rooster Line' as a humorous solution to the question of where Western Sydney begins. The eastern limits of Sydney Red Rooster franchise locations at the time formed a line that many regarded as an accurate representation of a Western Sydney boundary. Moreover, Red Rooster, often regarded culturally as a lower class of fast food, known for being unpopular, aligned ironically with a self-deprecating unsophisticated Western Sydney identity. The term gained cultural momentum following a 2017 Honi Soit publication, which further explored how Sydney food outlet distribution tends to map to distinct socioeconomic areas, describing how Sydneysiders experience ramifications in employment, healthcare and education depending on which side of the 'food fault lines' they fall.

Other names to describe similar divisions include the "Quinoa Curtain", the "Colorbond Fence", and the "Harris Farm Hedge".

=== "Divided by Chicken" ===
The Honi Soit article mapped the distribution of a number of different food brand franchise locations, particularly chicken-based, delighting in finding that the 'Red Rooster Line' reliably acted as a margin for restaurants of both eastern and western origin. The authors questioned whether this allopatric separation of brands was simply a function of consumer market forces, or whether expensive outlets contributed to a broader structural inequality excluding lower income residents. Other commentary has marked the possible expansion of higher-end chains like Chargrilled Charlie's as a sign of gentrification, threatening the borders of the 'Red Rooster Line'. Conversely, others have questioned whether the conception of the line is breaking down, with traditionally Western Sydney chains like El Jannah and Frangos expanding into the east.

== Socioeconomic ramifications ==
The Latte Line is a reliable division of socioeconomic advantage.

If you are north of that line you are largely a 'have'...If you are south of that line, you are largely a 'have-not'

— Geoff Roberts, economic commissioner of the Greater Sydney Commission

Western Sydney suffers poorer outcomes in virtually every metric of liveability, health, education and personal economy. In 2023, the Latte Line was reported to be 'hardening', with the rate of poverty rising disproportionately in Western Sydney. As the result of a cost of living crisis exarcerbated by housing stress, localities around the inner west and Parramatta have reported poverty rates as high as 32%, contrasted against a statewide level of 13.4%, and 5% in the inner north.

Educational outcomes are starkly divided by the line. Both HSC and NAPLAN scores are overwhelmingly dictated by which side a student may fall on, with eastern pupils being far more likely to place above average in both measures. The polarising results have been attributed to Sydney's socioeconomic stratification, with underachieving schools often being reportedly underfunded, in contrast to well-resourced schools in affluent areas.

The health of Western Sydney is poor compared to the metropolitan east, and has been characterised as the "diabetes capital of the country". Domestic violence is notably higher in suburbs like Blacktown, compared to the rest of the state.

== Labour and housing ==
The Latte Line presents a major obstacle in contemporary Sydney city planning.

=== NIMBYism and property values ===
Affluent communities in Sydney's north and east are often criticised as NIMBYs (Not In My Backyard), because of designed resistance to planning reforms that would allow increased density in these areas. Because housing density remains low, property values are significantly inflated. Housing affordability in Sydney closely conforms to the Latte Line, with properties being almost always valued above $1 million, and less than, below. East Sydney properties are attractive investments for commercial and private property speculators, again increasing competition and price. Correspondingly, urban sprawl is more and more westward, as workers seek affordable housing. While west Sydney housing is more affordable, residents are disadvantaged by a documented lack of services, infrastructure and significantly, jobs.

=== Employment deficit ===
Western Sydney suffers from an employment deficit, with more residents than employment opportunities. High-paying professional and white-collar employment is especially concentrated in north and east Sydney, posing an impediment to prospective workers living in the west. Overall, job offerings in the west are fewer in number and offer lower incomes and slower wage growth. Public transport connections between housing in the south/west and jobs in the north are lacking, with insufficient infrastructure and civil planning to accommodate the need. The spatial disconnect between housing and job opportunities is a major contributor to Sydney's legendary congestion, which remains the worst in the country. Peter Shergold likened the divide to an 'iron curtain', and reflected that business and industry should change their mindset of the 'gritty' western suburbs to better distribute professional and skilled labour across the city. Current attempts to address this issue include the development of university and healthcare precincts in the west to boost skilled employment opportunities, as well as new rail links. The Western Sydney Airport is expected to bring greater opportunities to the west, particularly in the defence, aerospace and advanced manufacturing industries. Additionally, premier Chris Minns has flagged a need for a shift in density zoning in the east.

== Climate ==
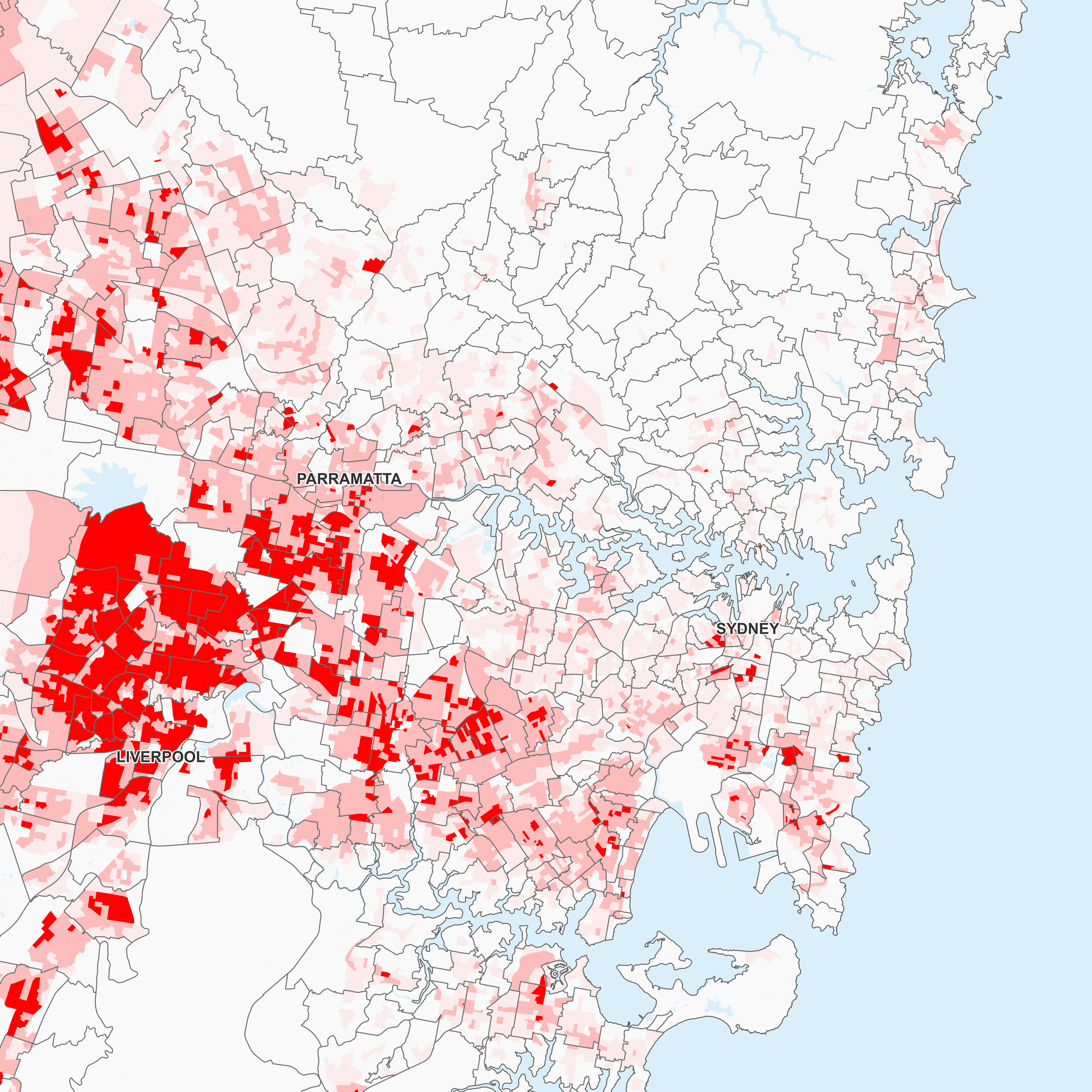
Map of Sydney by heat vulnerability index.

Land in Western Sydney, under the Latte Line is more vulnerable to heat and flooding. Western Sydney is a heat-health hotspot, with urbanised areas often reaching 10 °C hotter than other parts of the city. Fewer green spaces and less shade infrastructure such as bus shelters contribute to Western Sydney suffering greater heat vulnerability, which, when mapped, corresponds closely with the Latte Line. In contrast to 'leafy' eastern and northern suburbs, western suburbs often have less than 20% canopy cover. With areas under the line being on the frontline of climate vulnerability, the current Australian climate risk assessment projects that heat-related deaths may rise by more than 400% under current global warming models.

Rapid urbanisation in the west without commensurate infrastructure not only contributes to the formation of 'heat islands' under the division, but has also disrupted 'water recharge zones'. Expanding the built environment without proportional green space has made the region more susceptible to flooding. Additionally, urban sprawl continues to expand housing onto the Hawksbury-Nepean river catchment system, with these developments facing repeated flooding incidents in recent years.

== COVID-19 response ==
During the COVID-19 delta outbreak, the Berejiklian government designated 12 local government areas as 'LGAs of Concern', most of which were in Western Sydney, under the Latte Line. These targeted LGAs were subject to heightened policing and restrictions on freedom of movement. This practice drew criticism from local politicians and community leaders, who argued that the greater blue-collar, essential worker workforce in the west were being unfairly targeted. Many residents felt scapegoated, believing that the stiffer police powers and lockdown rules 'singled out' western suburbs, whereas eastern suburbs such as Bondi had merely gotten a 'slap on the wrist'. Premier Gladys Berejiklian apologised following comments which were seen as fuelling a narrative blaming large ethnic family gatherings for the spread of the virus. The lockdowns were criticised in light of the particular financial vulnerability of many Western Sydney communities, which emerged from COVID restrictions suffering increased unemployment. Experts have underlined how the toughness of the restrictions had long-lasting effects on mental health and domestic violence rates in these vulnerable neighbourhoods.

== In other contexts ==
The line reportedly delimits the beginning of a 'democracy sausage desert', with significantly fewer instances of the electoral tradition, which is usually staffed by community volunteers. Although significantly improved in 2025, electorates in Western Sydney have historically seen lower voter turnout than in the city's east.

== In other cities ==
While Sydney remains the most economically stratified city in Australia, some commentary has referred to similar 'lines' in other cities. Bernard Salt wrote of Melbourne's 'Latte Line' in 2011 as a "milky, middle class border" that circumscribed the professional working population, and framed a westward shift as a positive cultural transformation and reorientation of the middle-class. Conversely, the analogous concept of the "Goat's Cheese Curtain" or "Tofu Curtain" has been used to frame inner-city Melbournites, particularly politicians, as being out-of-touch. Similarly, others consider such expansion of Latte Lines as gentrification, inequitably excluding those of lower income. Although the concept is sometimes applied there, Melbourne does not approach the degree of economic segregation of Sydney, nor is there a clear margin of such. However, research has found a "widening divide between the well-off and the rest" in all five of Australia's largest cities—Sydney, Melbourne, Brisbane, Perth, and Adelaide.
