= Chooks Fresh & Tasty =

Defunct fast food chain

- Formerly: River Rooster
- Company type: Franchise system
- Industry: Fast food
- Founded: 1991; 35 years ago in South-west Western Australia
- Founder: Steve Hansen
- Defunct: 2010; 16 years ago
- Fate: Acquired and merged into Chicken Treat
- Headquarters: Stirling, W.A., Australia
- Number of locations: 34
- Area served: Western Australia, Queensland, Tasmania
- Key people: Steve Hansen
- Products: Chicken
- Owner: Quick Service Restaurant Holdings
- Website: Archive of website

Chooks Fresh & Tasty was a Western Australian fast food chain that specialized in barbecued and fried chicken.

== History ==
Chooks was originally a well known regional fast food brand named River Rooster. Operations began in Busselton and Margaret River in 1991. River Rooster stores were generally in areas that lacked popular fast food chains – namely Chicken Treat, Red Rooster or KFC.

Around 2003, the River Rooster name was dropped. The company felt they were not generating new transactions due to the similarity in brands with other outlets. The company started a competition where customers could submit new names to them for consideration, after which the final Chooks Fresh & Tasty name was adopted.

In October 2010, Chooks Fresh & Tasty was acquired by Quick Service Restaurant Holdings, which rebranded all of the locations as Chicken Treat.

== See also ==
- List of chicken restaurants
- List of restaurants in Australia
