= DLeña =

Restaurant in Washington, D.C., U.S.

dLeña
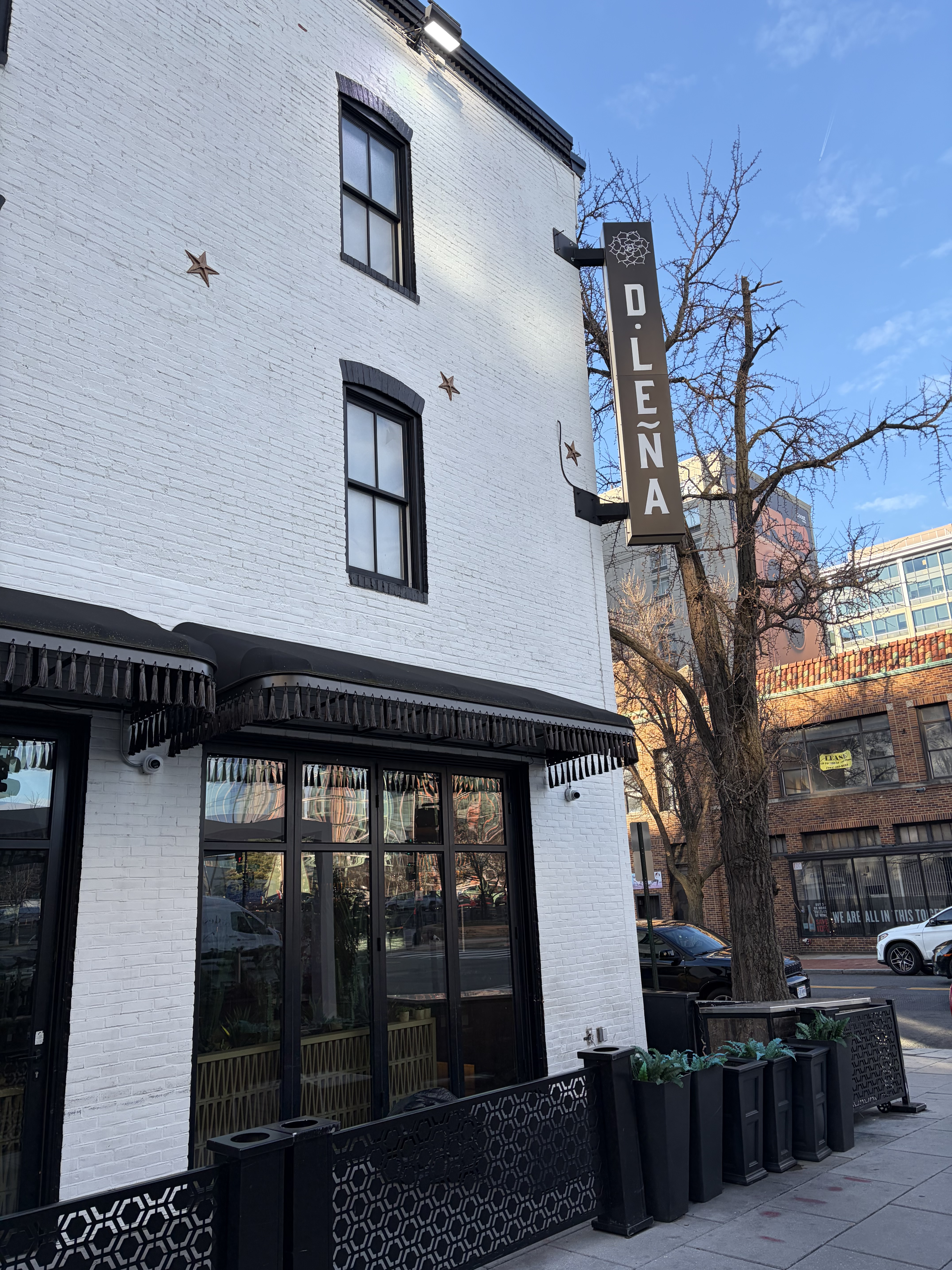
- The restaurant's exterior in 2026
- Interactive map of dLeña

Restaurant information
- Chef: Richard Sandoval
- Food type: Latin American; Mexican
- Location: 476 K Street NW, Washington, D.C., 20001
- Coordinates: 38°54′8.3″N 77°1′7.3″W

dLeña is a Latin American / Mexican restaurant in Mount Vernon Triangle, Washington, D.C.

== Description ==
The menu has included birria barbacoa, camarón, and hongos a la leña tacos. The chicken dish Medio Pollo al Carbón has a guajillo-achiote marinade, criolla sauce, and grilled broccolini. The drink menu includes margaritas and mimosas.

== History ==
Richard Sandoval is the chef.

== See also ==
- List of Mexican restaurants
