= Zombies (video game) =

2011 video game

- Developer: Babaroga
- Publisher: Twilight Creations Inc.
- Platforms: Windows Phone 7, Windows 8, iOS, Android
- Release: Windows Phone 7: NA: 12 January 2011; Windows 8: NA: 1 March 2013; Steam; Worldwide: March 28, 2024
- Genre: Turn-based strategy
- Modes: Single-player, multiplayer

Zombies (stylized as ZOMBIES!!!) is a video game adaptation of the popular tile-based board game by Twilight Creations Inc, publisher of the original game. The game was initially to be developed by Big Rooster for PlayStation Network, Xbox Live Arcade and Windows PCs through Steam, with possible versions for the Wii and the Nintendo DS. However, only Windows Phone 7 and Windows 8 versions have been confirmed after development of the game was resumed and taken over by Babaroga.

== Gameplay ==
The gameplay of Zombies is closely modeled on the original board game. Players move their "shotgun guy" (player piece) around the board trying to reach the helipad tile to escape the ever-growing zombie horde. Alternately, players can win the game by killing 25 zombies.

The Windows Phone 7 version of Zombies uses the touchscreen of the device for all control input. For example, players tap a die graphic to roll for character movement, zombie movement, and combat. Players can use touchscreen gestures to zoom in and out of the board as well as scroll to view different areas of the board.

The initial Windows Phone 7 release of Zombies supports single-player as well as multiplayer gameplay on one device. Human players can play against up to four NPC or human opponents in a "pass and play" game. In this style of play, Player 1 takes their turn, then passes the device to Player 2, who takes their turn and passes to Player 3, etc. According to developer Babaroga, on-line multiplayer for Zombies is in development for a future update to the game which may also include play "across multiple hardware setups."

Single-player gameplay in Zombies is a "Survival Mode" in which the "shotgun guy" is placed in a randomly generated town full of zombies. The player must move their "shotgun guy" to the helipad tile (as in a standard multi-player game) or kill all the zombies in the town in order to win the game.

== Development ==
Development of Zombies by Big Rooster was originally announced in October 2008.

In October 2009, videogame news site Joystiq reported that Twilight Creations was looking for another company to develop the game, but could not "disclose the status of [former developer] Big Rooster."

No further word on the game appeared until Microsoft announced a list of Xbox Live-compatible titles for their Windows Phone 7 platform at Gamescom 2010. Developed by Babaroga, the Windows Phone 7 version of Zombies was released on 12 January 2011, while the Windows 8 version was released on 1 March 2013. A version of the game for Xbox Live Arcade has been confirmed and was in active development, but it was cancelled.
