= Big Rooster =

Papua New Guinean fast food chain

- Industry: Fast food restaurants
- Founded: Mid-1970s
- Area served: Papua New Guinea
- Products: Barbecue chicken; Fried chicken
- Website: bigrooster.com.pg

Big Rooster (PNG) Ltd. is a Papua New Guinean fast food chain with 30 locations. Its specialty is barbecue chicken and fried chicken. Big Rooster has its roots in the Australian state of Queensland, where Nick Tana started the chain in the mid-1970s. It became a family-favourite in the 80s and was the second-largest chicken chain in the country. However, Big Rooster's Australian locations were all bought out by Coles Myer, owner of competitor Red Rooster, in 1986 and 1992. They were rebranded into Red Roosters, with only Papua New Guinean branches surviving.

== History ==
=== Australia (1970s–1992) ===
In the mid-1970s, best friends and business partners Nick Tana and Steve Fyfe started Big Rooster in Queensland, Australia. The fast food chain became a family-favourite in the state during the 80s. Its slogan was "What's the time? It's Big Rooster time!", and television advertisements featured the jingle "I'd rather have a sunny day and I'd rather have Big Rooster, I'd rather live the Queensland way and I'd rather have Big Rooster". Under the name Chicken World, Big Rooster also had locations in Western Australia.

When Kentucky Fried Chicken (KFC) opened in Sydney in 1968, it spearheaded American fast food's introduction into Australia. However, its growth in Australia was curtailed by the swift development of Queensland's Big Rooster and the Western Australian–based Red Rooster, which both specialised in roast chicken. After KFC, Big Rooster was the second-most popular chicken chain in the country. In February 1984, it had $160 million (17%) in retail sales. A company named Steggles Holdings owned 27 Big Roosters in New South Wales, nine in Victoria and had 16 franchises, all of which were bought by Red Rooster's owner Coles Myer in 1986. Coles Myer promptly converted these locations into Red Roosters, expanding their chain into New South Wales.

In 1988, Big Rooster and smaller competitor Chicken Treat merged into one company, Australian Fast Foods (AFF). AFF was run by Tana and Chicken Treat's Frank Romano. In 1992, Coles Myer bought AFF for AUS$20 million. The deal included Big Rooster's 92 locations in Queensland, two in the Northern Territory, and four overseas in Papua New Guinea. 46 of the stores, including the ones outside Queensland, were franchisees. Like the locations it acquired in 1986, it converted them all into Red Roosters. In 2002, AFF acquired Red Rooster, effectively buying back the locations it had lost.

=== Papua New Guinea (1992–present) ===
Since all Big Roosters in Australia have been rebranded into Red Rooster, the brand has been erased from the country. However, the chain continues to operate in Papua New Guinea. In 2024, General Manager Salim Chamadia claimed the brand has been in Papua New Guinea for 35 years.

In late 2018, Big Rooster announced they were spending K1.2 million for country-wide expansion plans to double their 26 outlets in three years. However, their growth has been stifled by robberies and criminal incidents. The Koki branch was ransacked and burnt down in the early 2024 riots, causing K16 million in damages. An article in the Papua New Guinea Post-Courier indicated that rebuilding of the Koki branch has started. While Big Rooster's website still lists Koki as its head office, the article said that a new branch in Konedobu was intended to serve as its new head office and open by 21 March.

== Operations ==
Big Rooster sells barbecue chicken, fried chicken and fish, rolls and burgers. Its menu also has sides such as fries, chicken nuggets, potato wedges, corn and peas. According to a 2024 article in The Morning Bulletin, in Australia, Big Rooster served tropical burgers, chicken, chips (fries), and banana fritters.

As of May 2024, Big Rooster's website lists 30 locations, mostly in the capital city of Port Moresby. The Post-Courier described it as "a well known food brand" there, and a state-run tourism website describes Big Rooster as Papua New Guinea's "biggest fast-food chain." Its head office was at its branch in Koki, which was ransacked and burnt down in the 2024 riots.
