= Red Rooster =

Australian fast food restaurant

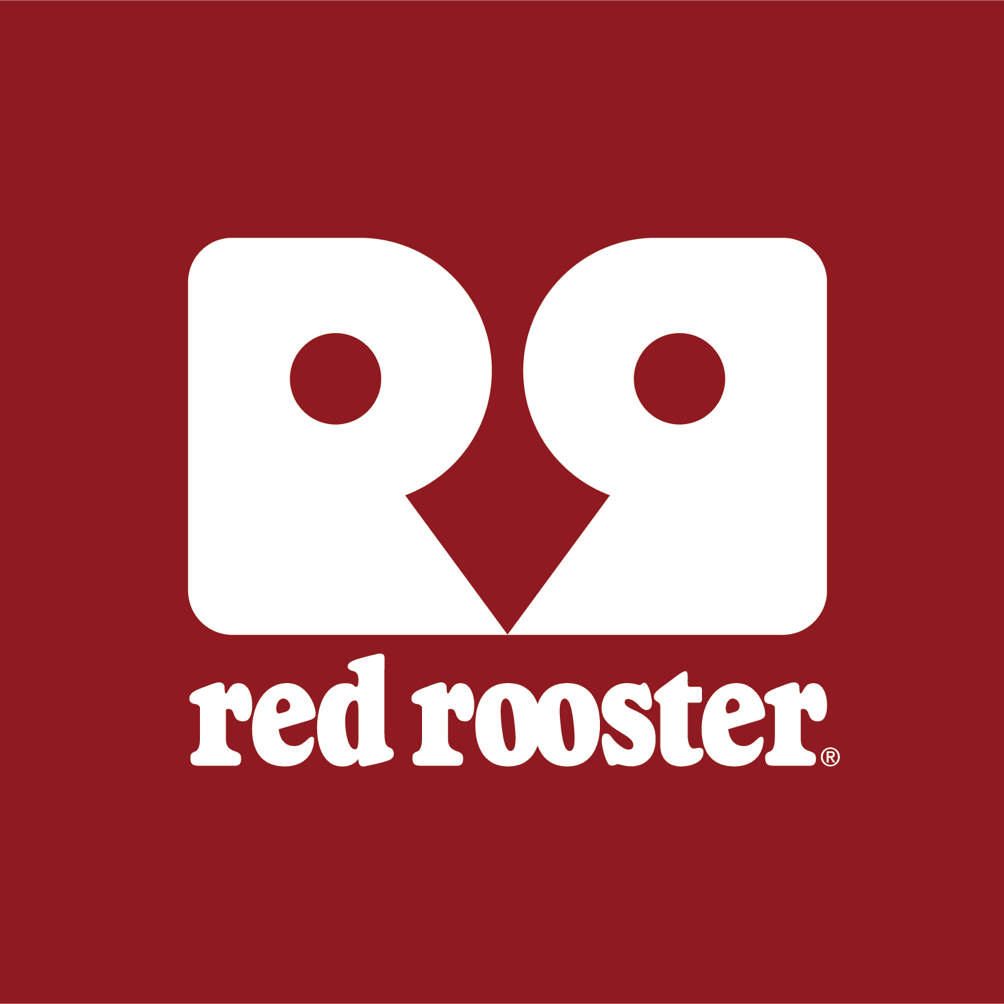

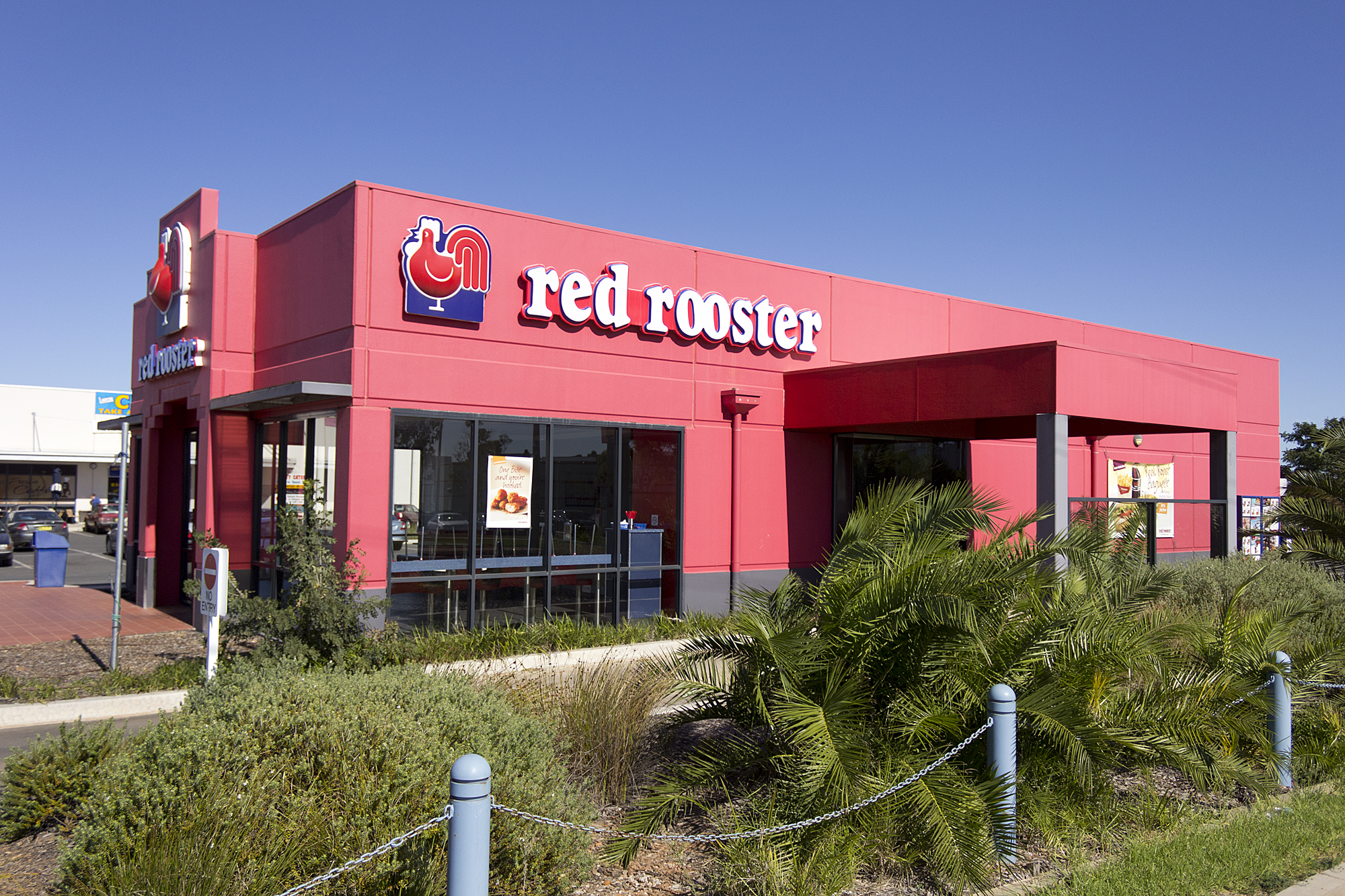
- Location in Leeton, New South Wales
- Trade name: Red Rooster
- Formerly: Alverno Pty. Limited
- Type: Subsidiary
- Industry: Fast food restaurants
- Founded: 1972; 54 years ago
- Headquarters: Chatswood, New South Wales, Australia
- Key people: Kailis family; Samantha Bragg (CEO)
- Products: Roast chicken; Fried chicken; Chips and sides; Burgers; Wraps; Rolls; Beverages
- Number of employees: 7500+
- Parent: PAG Asia Capital through Craveable Brands
- Website: redrooster.com.au

Red Rooster is an Australian fast food chain. It sells roast chicken alongside common fast food items, such as burgers, chips, salads, and beverages. Since 2021, it has also offered fried chicken.

In 1972, Peter and Theo Kailis opened the first Red Rooster in Kelmscott, Western Australia, a suburb of Perth. They sought to compete with American fast food chains such as Kentucky Fried Chicken, which came to Australia in 1968, by emulating their standardised model. Red Rooster proved successful, growing to 45 stores in Western Australia and Victoria before Myer bought it in 1981. Myer's 1986 purchase and merger of another chain, Big Rooster, into Red Rooster expanded it into the eastern states.

In 2002, Chicken Treat owner Australian Fast Foods (AFF) acquired Red Rooster. It changed hands between private equity firms several times and is currently owned by Craveable Brands, a holding company of PAG Asia Capital which also owns Chicken Treat and Oporto. In 2010, most Red Roosters were converted into franchises. While it has experienced a decline in popularity in recent years, as of 2021, Red Rooster is the sixth-most-popular fast food restaurant in Australia.

== History ==
=== Beginnings (1972–1981) ===
In 1972, Peter and Theo Kailis opened the first Red Rooster in Kelmscott, a suburb of Perth. The brothers were inspired by a chicken shop on Wanneroo Road. It marked a departure from their family background in fishing, pearling, and seafood. Unlike local restaurants, Red Rooster sought to compete with American fast food chains by emulating their standardised menu, branding, and marketing strategies.

At the time, American franchises such as McDonald's were yet to expand to Western Australia. They entered the Australian market in 1968, when Kentucky Fried Chicken (KFC) opened in Sydney, proving popular with the country's fledgling restaurant scene.

Initially, Red Rooster's chicken menu was based on rotisserie chicken, which, insofar as it is used in fast food restaurants at all, has been described as "definitely an Australian thing".

During the 1970s, Peter Kailis invented the Red Rooster Hawaiian Pack, made up of rotisserie chicken, a deep-fried banana and a pineapple ring.

Red Rooster quickly proved successful. In July 1981, when the Myer Emporium bought the chain for $8.97 million, it was the fourth-largest fast food group in Australia. It had 28 locations in Western Australia and 12 in Victoria, alongside five Red Bull hamburger outlets, which were separate buildings on the same site as Red Roosters. After the deal, Peter Kailis retained his positions as chairman and general manager.

=== Myer (1982–2002) ===
In 1981, Coles Myer bought the Big Rooster chain to expand into the eastern states (except non-Steggles' Queensland stores, formerly known as "Big Rooster", which were purchased in 1992), and renamed the stores "Red Rooster". Big Rooster remains operational in Papua New Guinea.

Between about the mid-1980s and 1995, Red Rooster replaced its rotisserie ovens with combi ovens, which reduced the cook time from 1½ hours to 55 minutes. Despite that change, Red Rooster continues to sell "rotisserie-style chicken" at its outlets.

=== Modern era (2003–) ===
In 2002, Red Rooster was purchased by Western Australian company Australian Fast Foods, which owned the competing Chicken Treat fast food chain. In 2007, both chains were sold for $180 million to a consortium formed by the management and Quadrant Private Equity.

In 2009, the Red Rooster chain in New Zealand closed its stores. The first New Zealand outlet, in Takanini, had opened in December 2004.

In 2010, Red Rooster changed company-owned stores to franchises. In 2011, Quadrant Private Equity sold parent company Quick Service Restaurant Holdings (later renamed Craveable Brands) to Archer Capital.

At some point prior to 2012, Red Rooster dropped its "famous Hawaiian Pack" from its menu. That year, the company reinstated the Hawaiian Pack, and also its Chicken Cheese and Bacon Burger, after running a social media campaign inviting customers to vote for their favourites. Two years later, in 2014, Red Rooster conducted a second phase of the campaign, during which customers were asked to vote between the two meals with the winner to stay on the menu permanently. By early 2018, the Classic Tropicana, which had a second pineapple fritter instead of the banana fritter, had replaced the Hawaiian Pack. As of 2025, the Classic Tropicana, in turn, had been replaced by the Trop Box, also with pineapple but no banana.

In 2019, ownership switched to PAG Asia Capital, a private equity group based in Hong Kong, who bought Craveable Brands for about $500 million. In Queensland later that year, seven Red Rooster stores on the Sunshine Coast closed when the franchisee went into voluntary administration.

The demographer Bernard Salt has echoed an observation that Red Rooster restaurants in Sydney are almost all in Greater Western Sydney, with the 'Red Rooster Line' dividing the city between the richer east and north, and the poorer west and south.

== Marketing and promotions ==
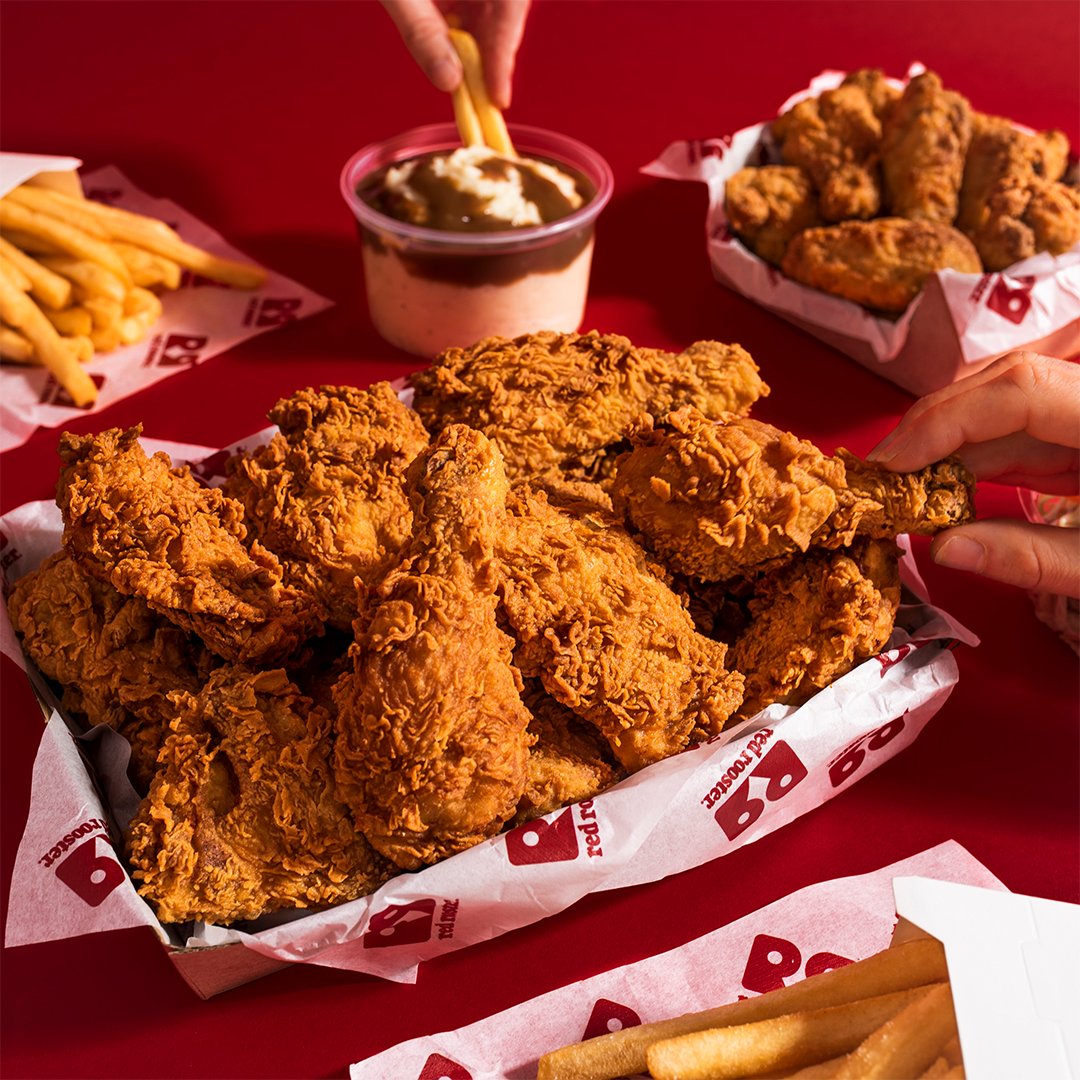
Red Rooster Fried Chicken

In 2009, Red Rooster ran an advertising campaign called "They don't get it in America" featuring comedian Tom Gleeson in the United States asking people about Red Rooster.

In 2010, Red Rooster was a sponsor of Supercars Championship team Holden Racing Team. In 2016, the team returned as the title sponsor of the Sydney SuperNight 300.

In 2011, Red Rooster changed to promoting its restaurants as healthy, fresh and quick.

Red Rooster launched its trial delivery service through Menulog in September 2014 from the Baulkham Hills, New South Wales restaurant, in partnership with Menulog. As well as delivery to homes, it was announced delivery options to businesses, sporting clubs and local organisations would be available.

== See also ==
- List of fast-food chicken restaurants
- List of restaurant chains in Australia

== Bibliography ==
- Murray, Andrew (2018). "A faster taste: Red Rooster and the architecture of Australian fast food" (PDF). Historic Environment. 30 (2): 100–111.
