= Pollo a la brasa =

Peruvian chicken dish

Pollo a la Brasa
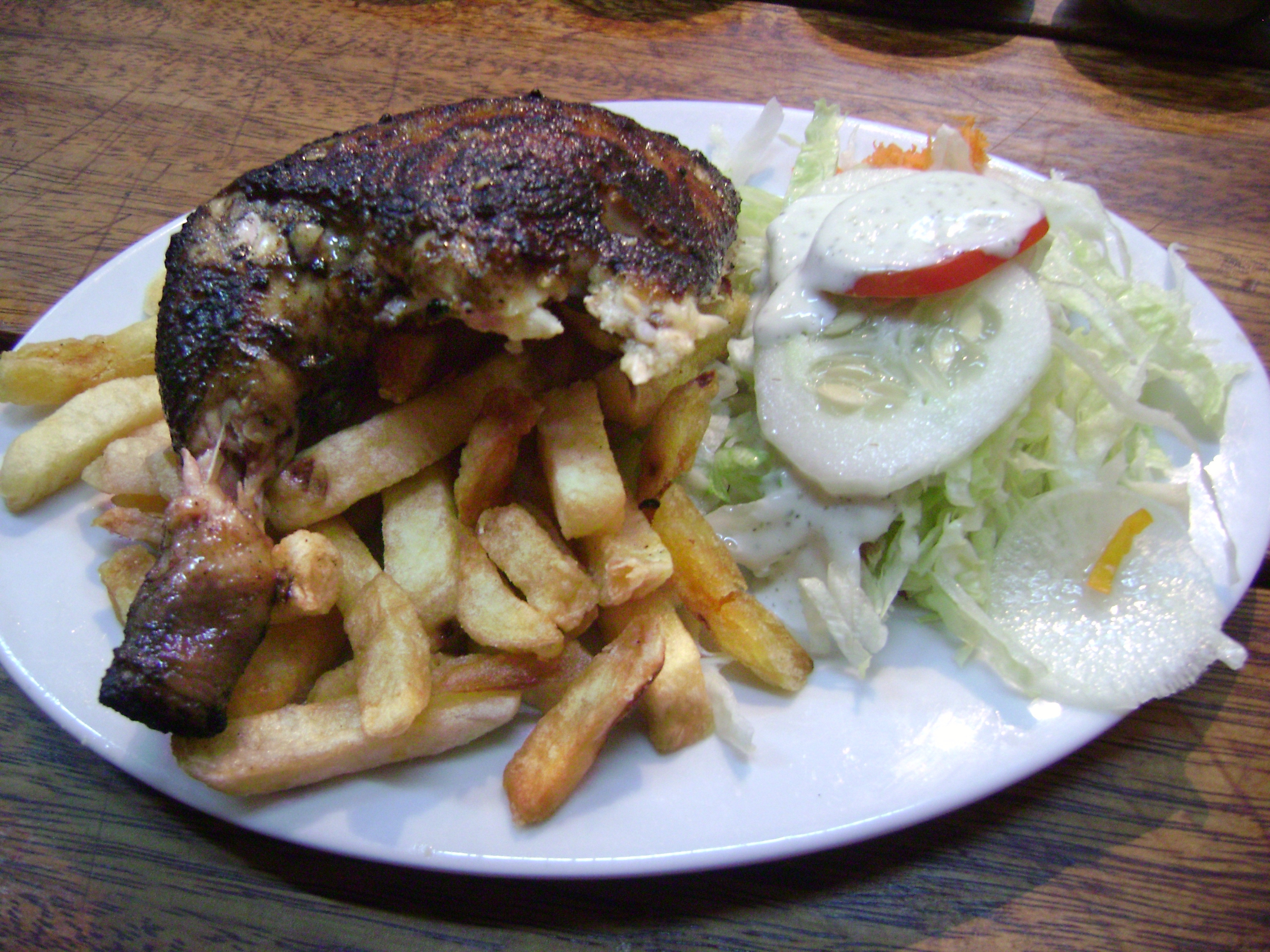
- "Un cuarto" (literally "one fourth") serving of pollo a la Brasa, accompanied with french fries and a fresh salad
- Alternative names: Blackened chicken
- Type: Rotisserie chicken
- Associated cuisine: Peruvian
- Created by: Roger Schuler and Franz Ulrich
- Invented: 1950s
- Main ingredients: Chicken
- Ingredients generally used: Salt
- Similar dishes: Pollo al spiedo

Pollo a la brasa, pollo asado, blackened chicken, or charcoal chicken is a variety of rotisserie chicken associated with the cuisine of Peru.

The dish was developed by Roger Schuler, a Swiss resident of Chaclacayo, Lima, in 1950. Schuler was a Swiss national who found it difficult to return to his home country during World War II, and eventually settled in Lima, working in hotels and restaurants. He devised the method of pollo a la Brasa (on a spit over charcoal) with the assistance of his business partners after observing his cook's technique, and created the Granja Azul restaurant in Santa Clara, district of Ate, in Lima. The dish was initially seasoned only with salt, was served with large french fries and eaten by hand.

After receiving a large catering order, he sought out a fellow Swiss immigrant, Franz Ulrich, a metalworker who developed a type of rotisserie oven to allow high throughput that he named "El rotombo". Over time, additional spices were added, including rosemary, huacatay, black pepper, soy sauce, ají panca, and cumin, and it became acceptable to eat the dish with cutlery. The Schuler family still owns the Granja Azul, and a number of other restaurants around Peru, and Ulrich continued to produce rotisserie ovens. The modern version is almost always served with mayonnaise-based sauces, or a salsa known as ají.

Pollo a la brasa is found in eateries throughout the world and is considered a staple item in Peruvian fusion restaurants. It is considered a national dish of Peru: the average Peruvians eats it three times a month, and rotisserie chicken restaurants make up 40% of the domestic fast food industry.

== See also ==
- Pollo al carbón, a similar Mexican dish
- List of chicken dishes
- List of spit-roasted foods
