= El Jannah =

Australian Lebanese fast food restaurant chain

El Jannah Franchise Company Pty Ltd

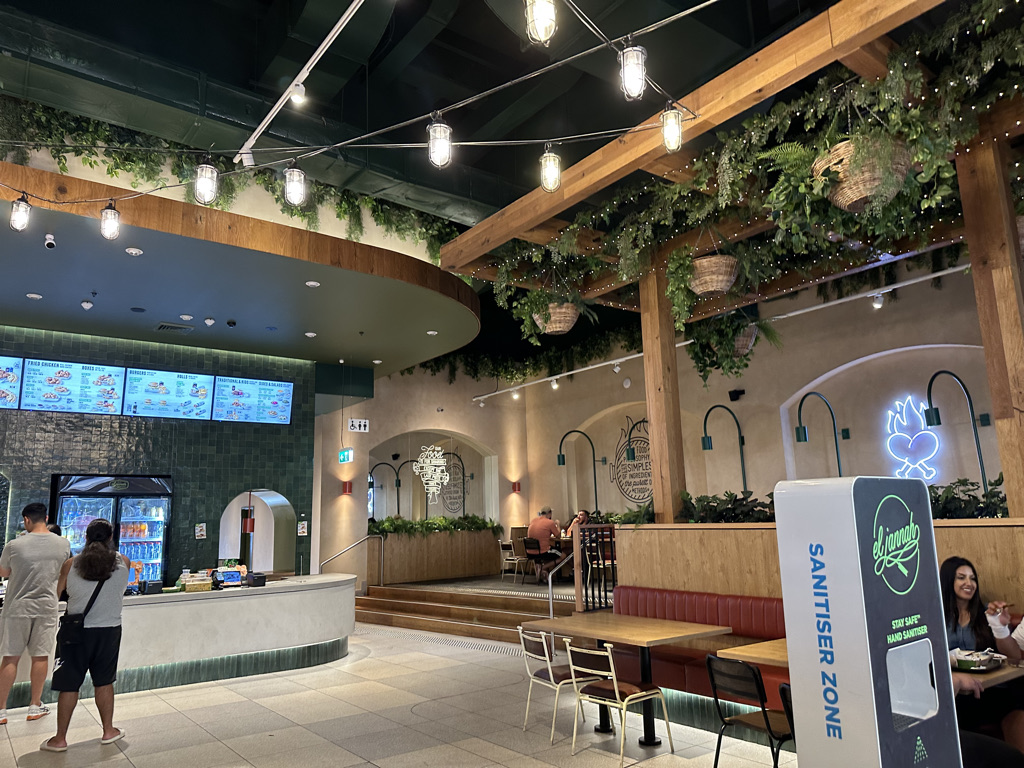
- El Jannah store in Liverpool, New South Wales
- Type: Private
- Industry: Fast food restaurant
- Founded: 1998
- Founder: Andre and Carole Estephan
- Headquarters: Sydney Olympic Park, New South Wales, Australia
- Number of locations: 66 restaurants (September 2026)
- Key people: Brett Houldin (CEO)
- Products: Charcoal chicken Fried chicken Skewers; Burgers; Wraps; Salads; Rolls
- Number of employees: 2000
- Website: eljannah.com.au

El Jannah Franchise Company Pty Ltd (Arabic: الجنة; lit. 'paradise' or 'heaven') is an Australian fast food restaurant chain that specialises in Lebanese cuisine. Its main menu items are a Lebanese style charcoal chicken with a garlic sauce (toum). The chain has 66 stores across New South Wales, Victoria and the Australian Capital Territory, as of March 2026.

== History ==
Founded by Andre and Carole Estephan, the first El Jannah store opened in the Sydney suburb of Granville in 1998. The chain's early coverage says its first shop "amassed a cult-like following". The Estephans stepped back from the day-to-day management of the chain in 2019. Brett Houldin, a former chief executive of Craveable Brands, became CEO of El Jannah in 2020.

The restaurant expanded to more than 20 outlets across the Sydney metropolitan area, as well as in the Sydney CBD and Macarthur by the late 2010s and early 2020s. The chain opened its first outlet outside of Sydney, in the Melbourne suburb of Preston in April 2022, and its first store in Canberra, in the suburb of Gungahlin, opened in May 2023.

In late November 2025, El Jannah was sold to American private equity firm General Atlantic. A sale price of A$800 million and "almost $1 billion" were reported. The Estephans and Houldin retained a minor stake in the company. General Atlantic had approximately US$118 billion (A$180 billion) in assets under management at the time. Following the acquisition, El Jannah announced plans to open more than 25 restaurants within 12 months and expand to 200 locations across Australia within five years. The Estephan family founders were to remain involved in the business.

== Products ==
El Jannah's menu centres on Lebanese style charcoal chicken and its garlic sauce (toum). The garlic sauce is an emulsified garlic condiment served alongside the chicken. The company describes the sauce as a family recipe and does not publish the exact formulation. The charcoal chicken is typically sold whole, half or in portions and is cooked over charcoal.

In December 2024, El Jannah introduced a breakfast menu at select Melbourne and Sydney outlets.

== Controversies ==
In February 2025, the Lebanese Muslim Association and Shia Muslim Council of Australia wrote to El Jannah regarding the removal of cricket commentator Peter Lalor from SEN 1116. The organisations called on El Jannah to withdraw its advertising from the station until Lalor was reinstated and an apology issued, and requested that SEN undertake education on the history of Palestine and donate $100,000 to UNHCR for children in Gaza. The letter stated that El Jannah itself had no involvement in Lalor's removal and had committed no wrongdoing.

Following General Atlantic's acquisition of a controlling stake in El Jannah in November 2025, calls to boycott the chain emerged among some customers and members of Muslim, Arab and pro-Palestinian communities. The campaign was prompted by criticism of General Atlantic's investment links to Israel.
