= Chicken Treat =

Australian fast food restaurant chain

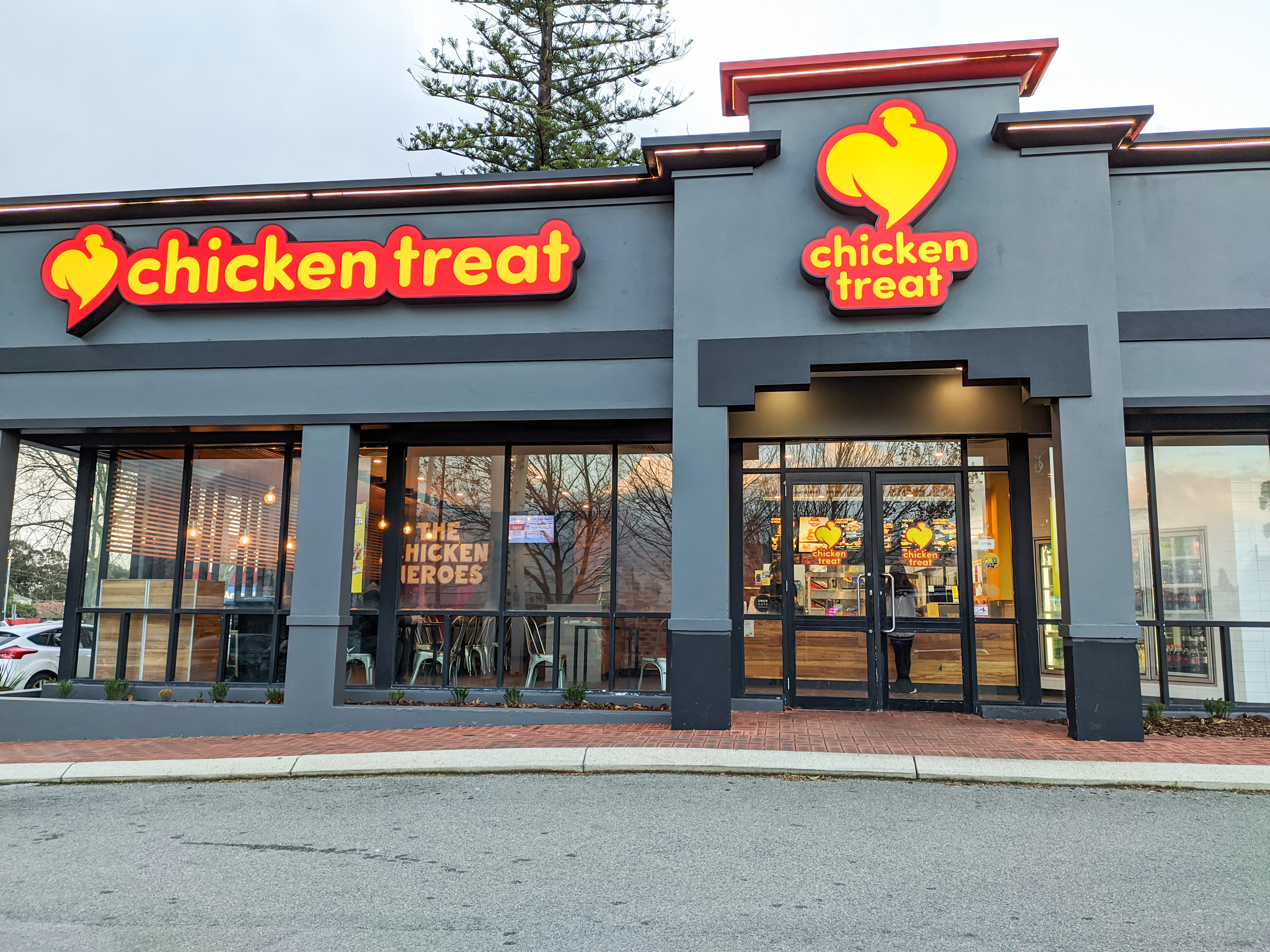
- Chicken Treat store in Inglewood
- Trade name: Chicken Treat
- Type: Subsidiary
- Industry: Restaurants Franchising
- Founded: 1976; 50 years ago
- Founder: Frank Romano
- Headquarters: Perth, Western Australia
- Number of locations: 61 (2026)
- Key people: Jamie Stewart
- Products: Barbecue/Rotisserie and Fried chicken, burgers
- Revenue: A$50 million
- Parent: PAG Asia Capital through Craveable Brands
- Website: www.chickentreat.com.au

Chicken Treat is a fast food restaurant chain that primarily operates in Western Australia. As of March 2023, Chicken Treat has over 60 outlets within Western Australia. The company provides a range of rotisserie chicken, fried chicken, and burger meals. Chicken Treat also offers catering services for families, groups, and businesses. It is owned by Hong Kong–based private equity firm PAG Asia Capital.

== History ==
The founder of Chicken Treat, Frank Romano, entered the barbequed chicken fast food industry in 1973 starting as a store manager for Chicken Spot and later becoming a shareholder of the proprietor West Coast Fast Foods Pty Ltd. Frank then founded Chicken Treat in 1976, with the first store opening in the suburb of Midland.

In 1989, Chicken Treat and its main east coast rival, Big Rooster, became allies as Australian Fast Foods. In early 2002, the parent company Australian Fast Foods purchased Red Rooster from Coles Myer. This was followed by a period of rebranding, changing existing stores in South Australia (which opened in the 1990s) from Chicken Treat to the more established Red Rooster brand, although there are a few areas where the two co-exist, for example in Western Australia.

In April 2007, Australian Fast Foods sold Red Rooster and Chicken Treat for $180 million to a consortium formed by the management and the venture capital arm of Westpac known as Quadrant Private Equity.

In early 2011, QSR Holdings acquired the Western Australian Chooks brand (formerly known as River Rooster), converting said stores into direct-service outlets with no drive-thru service. These stores all carry the newer Chicken Treat branding.

In June 2011, Archer Capital acquired Quick Service Restaurant Holdings from Quadrant Private Equity for an estimated $450 million (including Red Rooster and Oporto).

In October 2015, the chain began using "Betty the Chicken" to run the company's Twitter account in an attempt to secure an entry in the Guinness World Records. The company had over 8,000 followers in 2015 as a result.

In 2017, Chicken Treat moved its headquarters from 1 Whipple Street, Balcatta to 71 Walters Dr, Osborne Park, after the name change of its parent company from Quick Service Restaurant Holdings to Craveable Brands. Whipple Street was the headquarters of Chicken Treat for nearly two decades. Prior to that the headquarters were located at 12 Cleveland Street Dianella, which was destroyed by fire in the early 2000s.

In 2018, the restaurant expanded into Melbourne via a delivery-only kitchen offering. In December 2022 the company opened its first outlet in New South Wales at Eastern Creek. However Cravable brands has since converted the store into an Oporto restaurant. The chain planned to expand further into the state and the Australian Capital Territory.

In 2019, ownership switched to PAG Asia Capital when the Hong Kong–based private equity group bought Craveable Brands for about $500 million.

In September 2026, Chicken Treat became the principal sponsor of A-League club Perth Glory, appearing on the front of their A-League Men shirt. The deal re-united the two entities after almost 30 years, with Chicken Treat previously a sponsor of the club from its foundation in 1996 to 1998. Nick Tana, former chairman and part-owner of the club, had also owned Chicken Treat during its time as a subsidiary of Australian Fast Foods.

== See also ==
- Red Rooster
- Australian Food and Grocery Council
- List of barbecue restaurants
- List of chicken restaurants
- List of restaurants in Australia
