= Kailis =

Kailis may refer to:

- Michael Kailis (1929–1999), Australian businessman, founder of MG Kailis Group
- Patricia Kailis (1933–2020), Australian geneticist, neurologist and director of MG Kailis Group
- MG Kailis Group, Australian seafood and pearling business
- Kailis Brothers, Australian seafood and restaurant business

== See also ==
- qeylIS
