= Australian Fast Foods =

Australian fast food company

Australian Fast Foods Pty Limited
- Type: Private
- Industry: Fast food restaurants
- Founded: 1974
- Defunct: April 2007
- Successor: Quick Service Restaurant Holdings
- Headquarters: Balcatta, Perth, Western Australia
- Key people: Frank Oreste Romano (director)

Australian Fast Foods Pty Limited was an Australian fast food company that owned the Red Rooster and Chicken Treat restaurant chains. In 2007, the company was reorganised into Quick Service Restaurant Holdings, now known as Craveable Brands. The company was based in Balcatta, Western Australia and employed 6,956 people. As owner of Red Rooster and Chicken Treat, it was the joint fifth largest fast food operator in Australia after McDonald's, KFC, Hungry Jack's and Subway, with 450 outlets.

== History ==
Red Rooster (Kelmscott, Western Australia) was founded in 1972 by the Kailis Family of Western Australia. Chicken Treat was founded in 1974 and collaborated with Big Rooster to form Australian Fast Foods Pty Ltd in 1989. Australian Fast Foods sold Red Rooster to Coles in 1992, which then bought Big Rooster stores and amalgamated them, and then sold it back in 2002. The first outlets were established in New Zealand in 2005.

In 2007, Romano bought out Tana's share in Australian Fast Foods, and with Quadrant formed Quick Service Restaurant Holdings, which now owns Red Rooster and Chicken Treat.
