= Baiada Poultry =

Australian poultry company

- Type: Private
- Industry: Food services; agriculture
- Founded: Sole trader: c. 1920s; Baiada Pty Limited: 1963; 63 years ago; in Pendle Hill, Sydney, Australia
- Founder: Celestino “Charlie” Baiada
- Headquarters: Sydney, Australia
- Area served: Australia
- Products: Steggles and Lilydale poultry products
- Revenue: A$3.6 bn (2024)
- Net income: A$246.6 million (2024)
- Owner: Simon Camilleri and family
- Number of employees: 2,200 (2012)
- Website: baiada.com.au

Baiada Poultry is a privately owned company that produces poultry products throughout Australia. Its operations include broiler and breeder farms, hatcheries, processing plants, feedmilling and protein recovery. Its head office is at Pendle Hill, New South Wales with plants in Beresfield, Tamworth, Victoria, Queensland and South Australia. As of 2012, the company employed approximately 2,200 people. Baiada is one of Australia's largest poultry processing companies with a market share of more than 20%, producing the Lilydale Select and Steggles brand to retailers including Coles, Woolworths, IGA, Aldi, McDonald's, KFC, Pizza Hut, Red Rooster, Nando's and Subway. Its main competitor is the publicly listed Inghams.

In 2025, the owners of the company, Simon Camilleri and family, appeared for the first time in the Financial Review Rich List as the 58th wealthiest Australians, assessed on the basis of net worth. In addition to poultry operations, the family have significant property investments.

== History ==
The business was founded in the c. 1920s by Celestino “Charlie” Baiada, a Maltese migrant who arrived in Australia in 1916, aged 14 years. He commenced working as a kitchen hand, and subsequently purchased a house in Pendle Hill, in western Sydney, to farm chickens and operate as a market garden. During World War II, Baiada, operating as a sole trader, secured an Australian Government contract for the supply of chicken products (Note: One source claims that the contract was for the supply of potatoes.) to the Australian Army, and the business significantly expanded. During the 1960s and 1970s, Baiada began supplying poultry to butchers, clubs, restaurants, and then supermarket chains. The company, Baiada Pty Limited was established in 1963.

Baiada and his wife had seven children, one of whom, Mary, married Frank Camilleri. Camilleri became a shareholder in the private family company and managed sales and distribution; whilst Baiada focused on production. As the company grow, Baiada took on the role of company chair and Camilleri became company secretary. Baiada died in 1983, aged 81 years. His grandson, John Camilleri, a son of Mark and Frank, then commenced leading the business during a period of growth. In 2009, the business acquired Bartter Holdings, that operated the Steggles brand, and built on their Lilydale brand. Now led by Simon Camilleri, it was reported that in 2024 the company generated A$3.6 billon in revenue and A$246.6 million in net profit; and made distributions to shareholders totalling A$183.8 million.

== Controversies ==
The company has been embroiled in scandals involving deceptively selling chicken products as free range and the exploitation of migrant workers.

=== Misleading free to roam labelling scandal ===
In September 2011 the Australian Competition & Consumer Commission (ACCC) commenced federal court action against Baiada Poultry, Bartter Enterprises, and the Australian Chicken Meat Federation, alleging that they engaged in misleading and deceptive conduct and made misleading representations that meat chickens were "free to roam around in large barns". The ACCC argued the chickens were reared indoors with high-density stocking (20 chickens per square metre) that significantly restricted their ability to roam. Such a definition of free to roam would leave room for 2.2 chickens on an A3 size page.

On 30 October 2013 the Federal Court of Australia ordered Baiada Poultry and Bartter Enterprises, the processors and suppliers of Steggles branded chicken products to pay a total of $400,000 in civil pecuniary penalties, declaring that the companies contravened the Trade Practices Act and the Australian Consumer Law by engaging in "false, misleading and deceptive conduct (or conduct liable to mislead and deceive)" when it described on product packaging and in advertising that its meat chickens were "free to roam in large barns".

The Australian Chicken Meat Federation, the peak industry lobby group for the Australian chicken meat industry, was also ordered to pay $20,000 in penalties by asserting in publications on its website that chickens in Australia were "free to roam" or able to "roam freely" in large barns.

=== Foreign workers exploitation scandals ===
In September 2010, the Australian Office of the Fair Work Ombudsman commenced an investigation into allegations that Adelaide Poultry — part of the Baiada Group of Companies, had contravened Commonwealth workplace laws after public comments were made alleging underpayment of its workers. It determined that the company had contravened workplace laws and an agreement to resolve the contravention without the need to resort to civil penalty litigation was made by way of an "Enforceable Undertaking" made under the Commonwealth Fair Work Act 2009.

On 4 May 2015, television program Four Corners reported on the exploitation of migrant workers within the Baiada factories. In response to the allegations, Baiada issued a formal response, stating that "there [was] no substantial compliance failures" and "there [was] no exploitation of migrant workers".

However, in his investigation into the matter, the Fair Work Ombudsman confirmed the allegations and found that the company paid foreign workers on holiday 417 class working visas about half the lawful minimum hourly wage and that they worked up to 18 hours a day without paid overtime. The foreign workers were forced to live in slum houses with 20 others and to sometimes share mattresses. The Ombudsman found that much of the work was off the books with the foreign workers paid in cash and that the labour hire companies that Baiada engaged provided inadequate, missing or fabricated records. During the course of the investigation, 23 of 39 contractors complained of financial instability and four of six principal contractors ceased trading. Baiada refused to let Fair Work Commission inspectors into their three NSW processing plants — at Beresfield, Hanwood and Tamworth during the investigation.

Despite promising to improve workplace practices, Baiada continued to attract criticism, including from the Uniting Church. Signed witnesses statements from Baiada chicken plant workers suggested that questionable work practices were continuing at some plants and that the company was still dealing with disreputable labour hire companies. Some of these companies had bogus business addresses.

On 26 October 2015 the Fair Work Ombudsman released a statement saying Baiada has agreed to a compliance partnership to make good past underpayments by contractors and to ensure compliance with workplace laws in the future. The company agreed to take responsibility for paying up to $500,000 in wages that its contractors failed to pay workers, even though it did not directly employ them.
