= Oporto (restaurant) =

Australian fast food restaurant

Oporto Holdings Pty Ltd

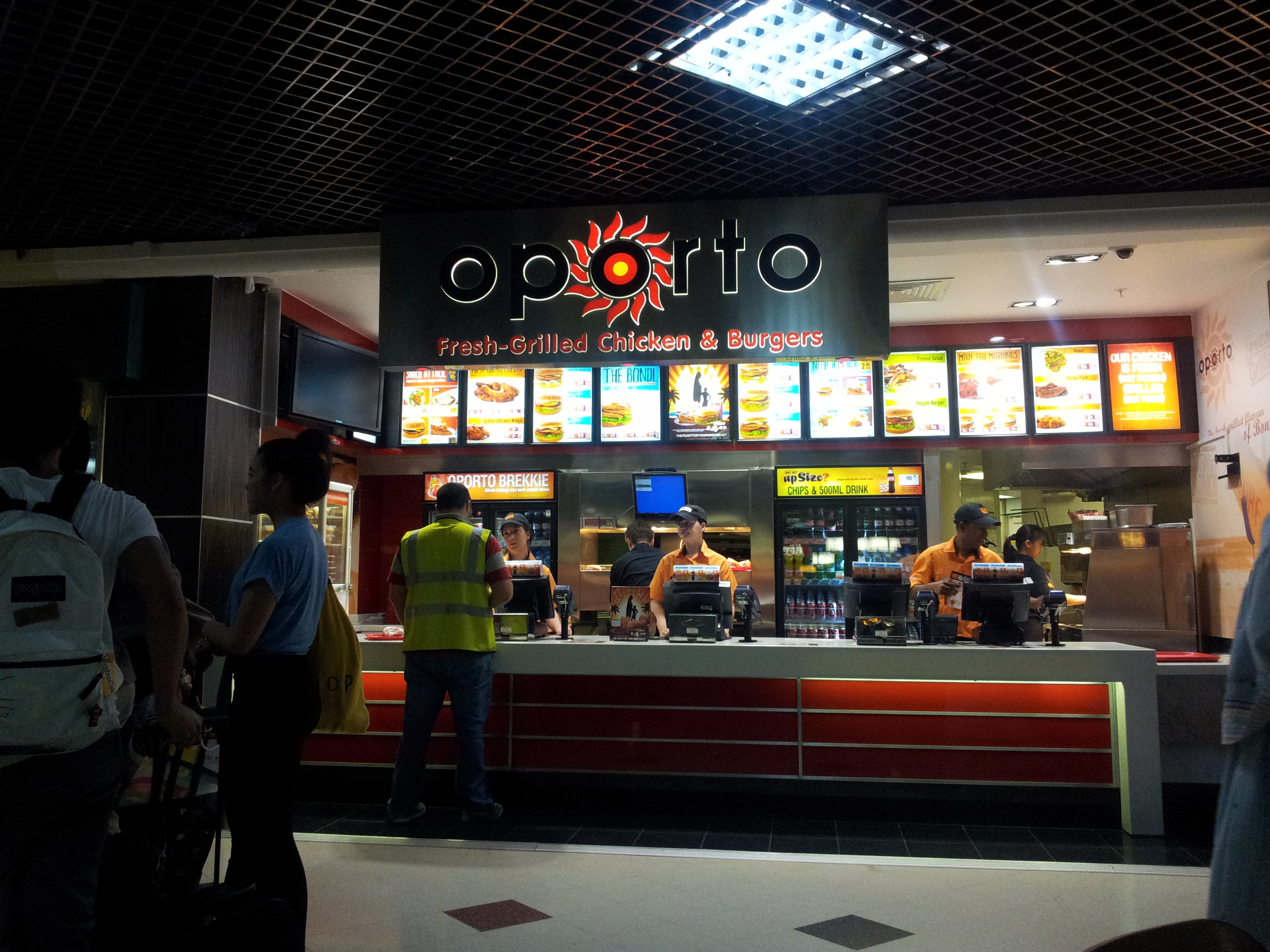
- Victoria Place, located above Victoria station, in London, 2011
- Type: Subsidiary
- Industry: Food
- Founded: 1986; 40 years ago (Original store); 1995; 31 years ago (1st franchise)
- Headquarters: Chatswood, New South Wales, Australia
- Areas served: Australia; New Zealand; United Arab Emirates
- Key people: Therese Frangie – CEO
- Products: Chicken products, burgers, wraps, salads, sides and desserts
- Parent: PAG Asia Capital through Craveable Brands
- Website: www.oportomenu.com (Australia) www.oportomenu.com (New Zealand) www.oportomenu.com (Oporto Menu)

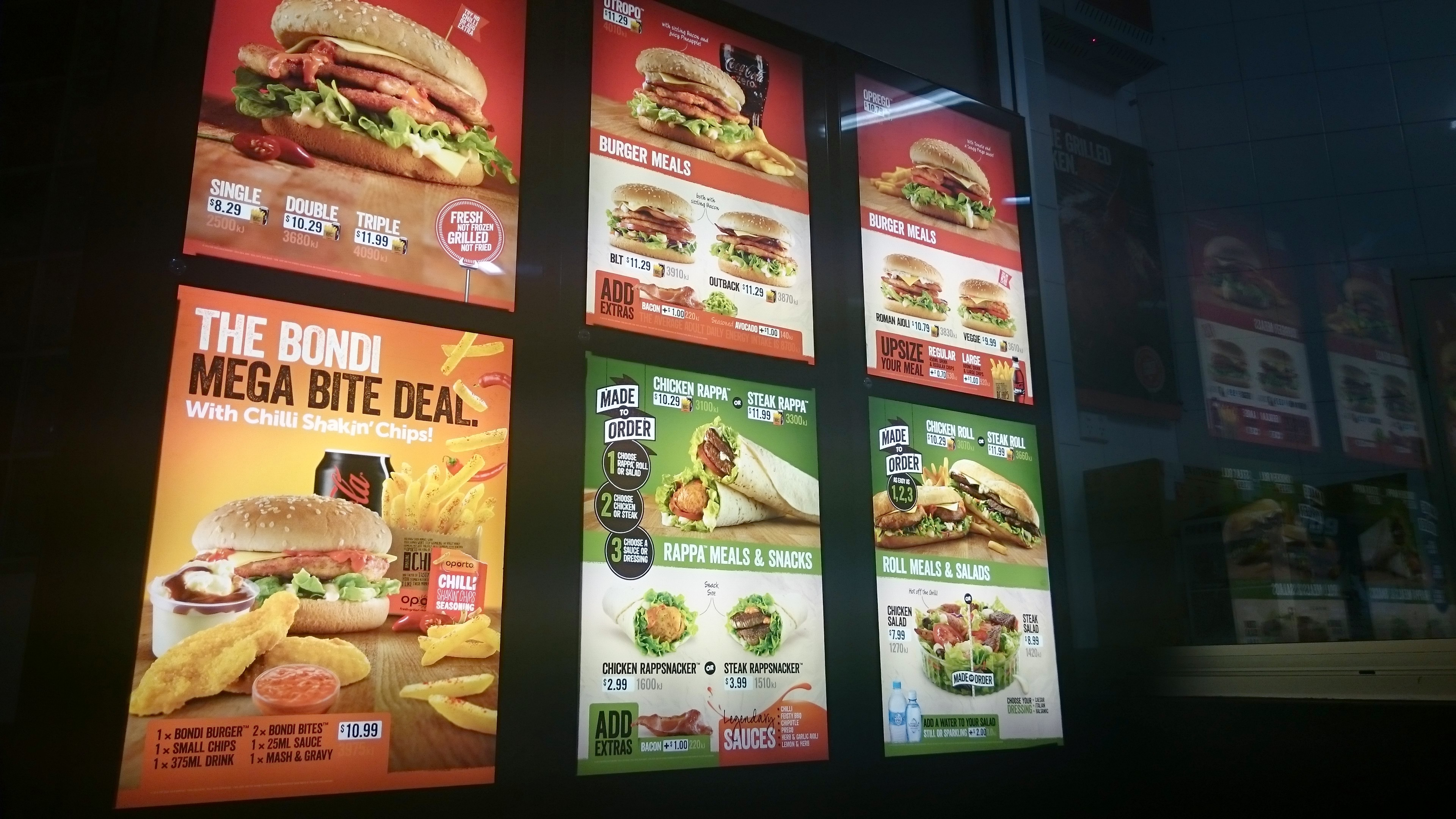
Oporto Drive-through menu in Sydney in October 2014

Oporto Holdings Pty Ltd is an Australian fast food restaurant franchise with a Portuguese theme. Oporto specialises in Portuguese-style chicken and burgers. It is owned by parent investment firm PAG Asia Capital, which also owns the Red Rooster and Chicken Treat restaurant chains.

Oporto has more than 200 eat-in or take-away restaurants in Australia and New Zealand. It previously also operated stores throughout China and expanded to Sri Lanka and Vietnam in August 2018. Oporto is also looking to expand its operations into the Middle East; its Dubai store opened in early 2020.

== Founding and history ==
Oporto's first restaurant was founded in 1986 by António Cerqueira, an Australian of Portuguese descent, in North Bondi, New South Wales, Australia, but was originally named Portuguese-Style Bondi Charcoal Chicken. The 'Oporto' name came from Cerqueira's favourite football team, FC Porto. The second location was opened in Maroubra Junction.

The franchise right was sold, but António Cerqueira kept the original store, with the second store becoming a franchise store later. The event that led to the closing of original store (on the hill at Bondi) began after the franchise opened a store in Bondi Junction, with the original owners having exclusive rights to the suburb of Bondi. An agreement was reached whereby the original store closed and a new, larger franchise store was built at the bottom of the hill close to the beach at Bondi.

Oporto first opened a franchise store in 1995 and was named the fastest growing franchise in Australia in January 2005 by Business Review Weekly. To this day, their long-running jingle and slogan featured in many advertisements since the late 1990s and early 2000s is "Just Gotta Go, Oporto!".

In 2007, there were 100 locations in New South Wales, 14 in Queensland, eight in Victoria, five in the Australian Capital Territory, five in South Australia, and six in New Zealand. Some of these restaurants are called Oporto Express and offer a smaller range of products – most commonly this means they do not offer a breakfast menu.

Oporto opened their first store in the United Kingdom at London's Victoria Station in January 2009, although this store closed on 18 October 2011, and they opened their first restaurant in the United States in Rancho Cucamonga, California, on 25 February 2011. Oporto stores in the United States were all converted to Feisty Chicken Grill in 2013. There are now over 100 stores in operation in Australia and New Zealand. Oporto has three types of Oporto store types: drive-thru, shopping centre, and strip store.

== Parent ownership and acquisitions ==
In July 2007, Quadrant Private Equity and Quick Service Restaurant Holdings now known as Craveable Brands (which owns Red Rooster and Chicken Treat) purchased Oporto.

In June 2011, Archer Capital acquired Quick Service Restaurant Holdings from Quadrant Private Equity for an estimated $450 million (including Red Rooster and Chicken Treat).

On 26 March 2012, Oporto ceased trading in China, closing its three outlets.

On 7 April 2013, Oporto's US franchisee closed its three outlets.

In 2013, Oporto opened their first restaurant in Western Australia in South Perth. Oporto has since increased to over 8 stores in the region.

== See also ==
- Nando's – A Portuguese-style chicken restaurant of South African origin
- List of fast-food chicken restaurants
- List of restaurant chains in Australia
