= Craveable Brands =

Australian fast food restaurant chain holding company

Craveable Brands Ltd
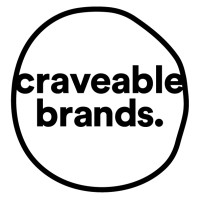
- Formerly: Quick Service Restaurant Holdings (2007–2017)
- Type: Subsidiary
- Industry: Fast food restaurants
- Predecessor: Australian Fast Foods
- Founded: 2007
- Headquarters: Sydney, New South Wales, Australia
- Number of locations: 580
- Area served: Australasia; Southeast Asia
- Key people: Josh Kilimnik (CEO)
- Revenue: A$800 million (2018)
- Number of employees: 12,500
- Parent: Quadrant Private Equity (2007–2011); Archer Capital (2011–2019); PAG Asia Capital (2019–present)
- Subsidiaries: Red Rooster; Oporto; Chicken Treat; Chargrill Charlie’s
- Website: craveablebrands.com

Craveable Brands Ltd (formerly known as Quick Service Restaurant Holdings) is an Australian fast food restaurant holding company. It owns the franchise chains Red Rooster, Oporto, Chicken Treat and Chargrill Charlie’s brands with 620 restaurants throughout Australasia and Southeast Asia. The company has been a subsidiary of Hong Kong–based private equity firm PAG Asia Capital since July 2019.

== History ==
Craveable Brands was founded in 2007 as Quick Service Restaurant Holdings (QSR) from the management buyout of Australian Fast Foods (AFF). The A$180 million deal was in partnership with Quadrant Private Equity, AFF's managing director Frank Romano, and other management members.

In July 2007, QSR acquired the Oporto chain of restaurants for A$60 million.

In June 2011, Archer Capital acquired QSR from Quadrant Private Equity for an estimated A$450 million.

In May 2017 the company was renamed from Quick Service Restaurant Holdings to Craveable Brands Ltd. in advance of a proposed stock market flotation. In July 2019, parent company Archer Capital sold Craveable Brands to PAG Asia Capital for an estimated A$450–500 million.

In May 2023, Craveable Brands acquired the Chargrill Charlie’s chain.

In late 2024, PAG Asia Capital failed to sell Craveable Brands to Affinity Equity Partners for $800 million, after the latter performed due diligence.
