= Archer Capital =

Australian private equity investment firm

- Formerly: GS Private Equity
- Type: Proprietary limited company
- Industry: Private Equity
- Predecessor: Byvest Management Buyout Group
- Founded: 1996; 30 years ago
- Headquarters: Sydney, Australia
- Products: Private equity funds
- Website: www.archercapital.com.au

Archer Capital is an Australian private equity investment firm based in Sydney. It was founded as GS Private Equity in 1996. Archer Capital hosts multiple investment funds which invest in businesses across a wide array of industries and sectors, specifically targeting mid-market leveraged buyouts in Australia and New Zealand.

The firm currently owns or co-owns a number of Australian and New Zealand companies including Allity and Craveable Brands. Previous investments include Australian Geographic, Dome, John West Foods, MYOB, Rebel, Supercars Championship and Repco.

== Notable investments ==
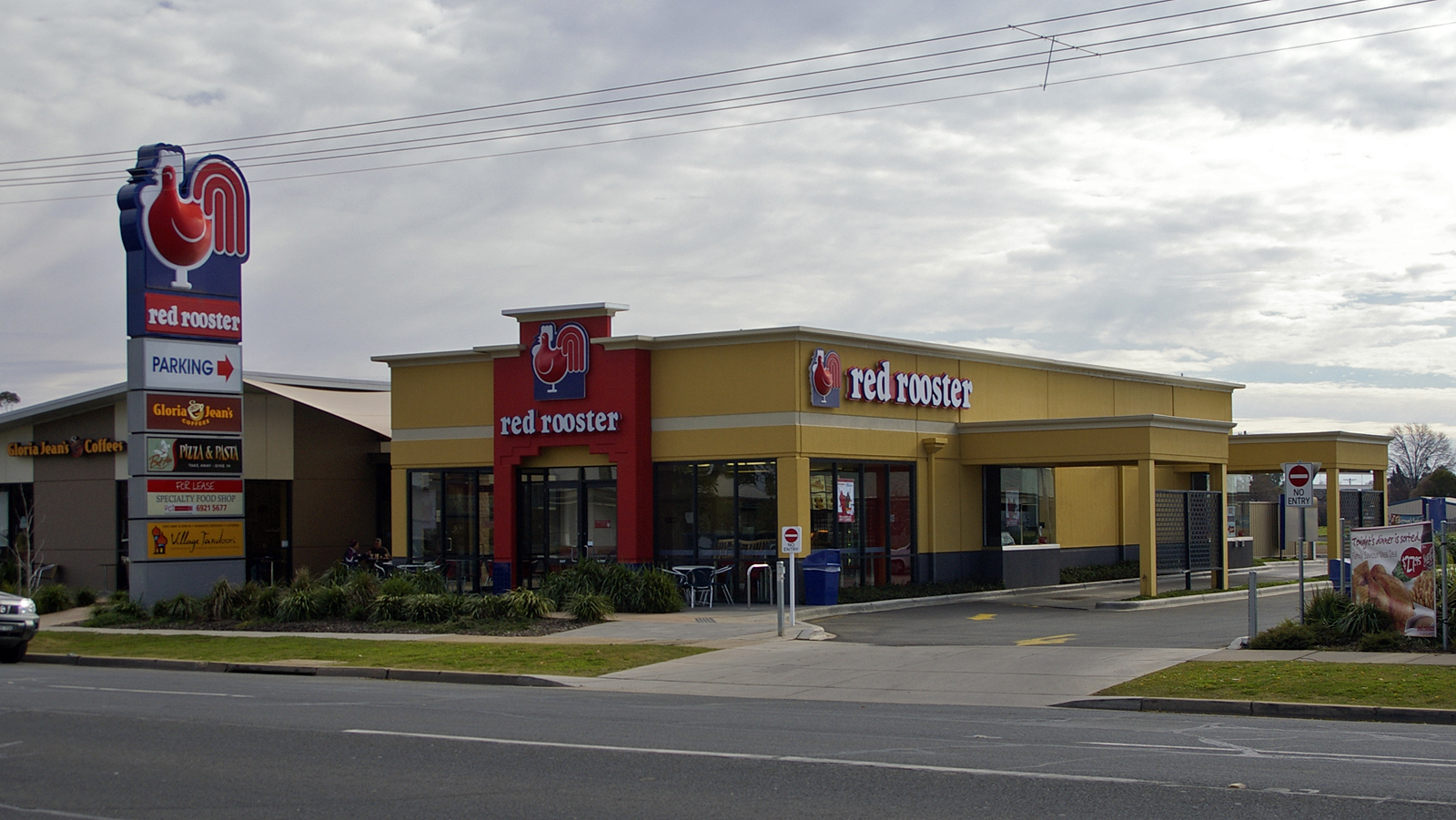
A Red Rooster outlet

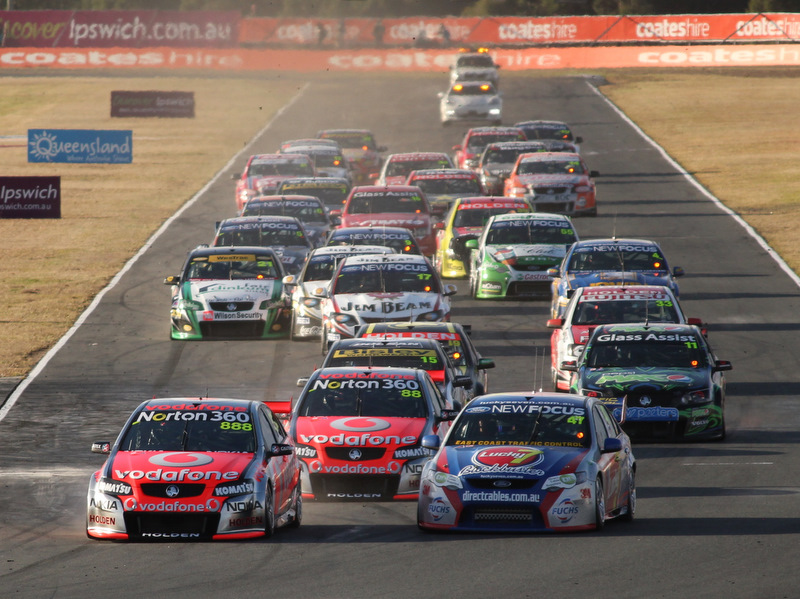
A V8 Supercars Championship race in 2011

In 1998, the firm partnered with the then-management of Australian Geographic to purchase the business for A$50 million. It was later sold to a consortium including the Myer family.

In 2000, Archer Capital gained a 50% stake in Dome coffeehouses, selling for A$20 million in 2003 to Navis. In 2001, Archer was part of a consortium (paying A$30 million) which purchased Repco from Pacific Dunlop, publicly listing the company on the Australian Stock Exchange in 2003.

Archer Capital was involved in the purchase of John West Foods from Unilever in 2003. Archer divested a few years later.

In 2009, the company lead a A$450 million takeover of MYOB, taking the company private. It was sold two years later for A$1.1 billion to Bain Capital.

In 2011, Archer acquired Quick Service Restaurant Holdings (renamed Craveable Brands in 2017) for A$450 million from Quadrant Private Equity, which holds 620 Australian-owned Red Rooster, Chicken Treat and Oporto fast food restaurants. In the same year it also became a major investor in the Supercars Championship.

In 2013, Archer purchased 30 aged care facilities from Lendlease, forming provider Allity. It has subsequently grown to be one of the largest care providers in Australia.

== Funds ==
Archer Capital has operated a total of 5 individual funds.

Fund	Year established	Capital (A$b)
Archer Capital Fund No. 1	1998	$0.104
Archer Capital Fund No. 2	2001	$0.192
Archer Capital Fund No. 3	2004	$0.45
Archer Capital Fund No. 4	2007	$1.36
Archer Capital Fund No. 5	2011	$1.5
