= Pollo al carbón =

Charbroiled chicken

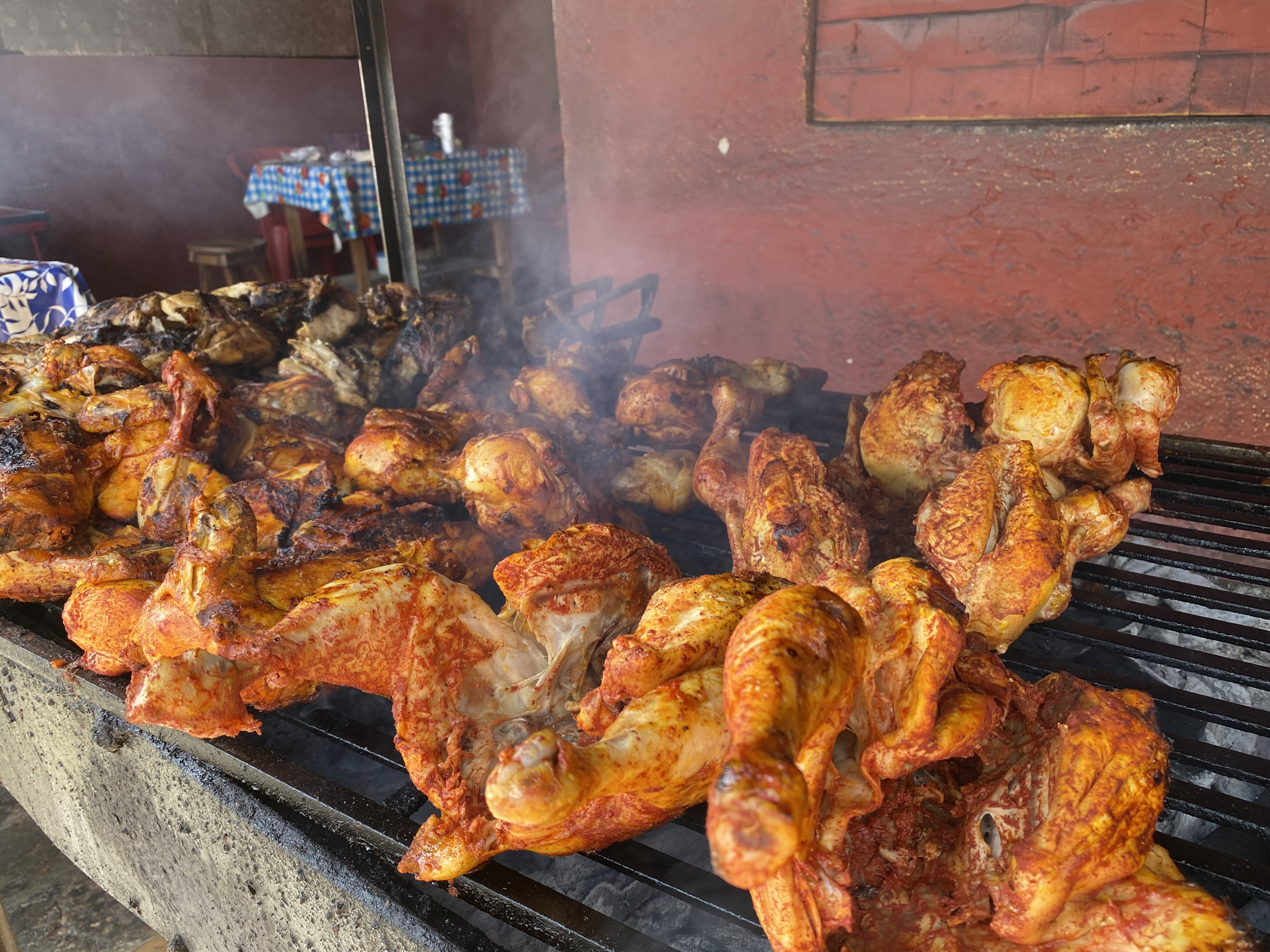
- Pollo al carbón being grilled in Valladolid, Yucatán, Mexico
- Alternative names: Pollo asado al carbón Chicken al carbón
- Type: Grilled chicken
- Region or state: Northern Mexico
- Associated cuisine: Mexican cuisine
- Main ingredients: Chicken

Pollo al carbón (lit. 'Charcoal chicken'), also called pollo asado al carbón or chicken al carbón, is a Latin American dish made of charbroiled chicken that has been marinated in a chili and citrus sauce.

== History ==
Pollo al carbón originates in northern Mexico. It is commonly sold with tortillas by food stands in Mexico. It has spread throughout the Southwestern United States and is popularly eaten in Tex-Mex cuisine. The dish is commonly sold by small, inexpensive restaurants in the Dominican Republic, paired with rice and beans and salads.

Similar grilled chicken recipes are found throughout Latin America, Spain, and Portugal, featuring variations on marinade and method of preparation.

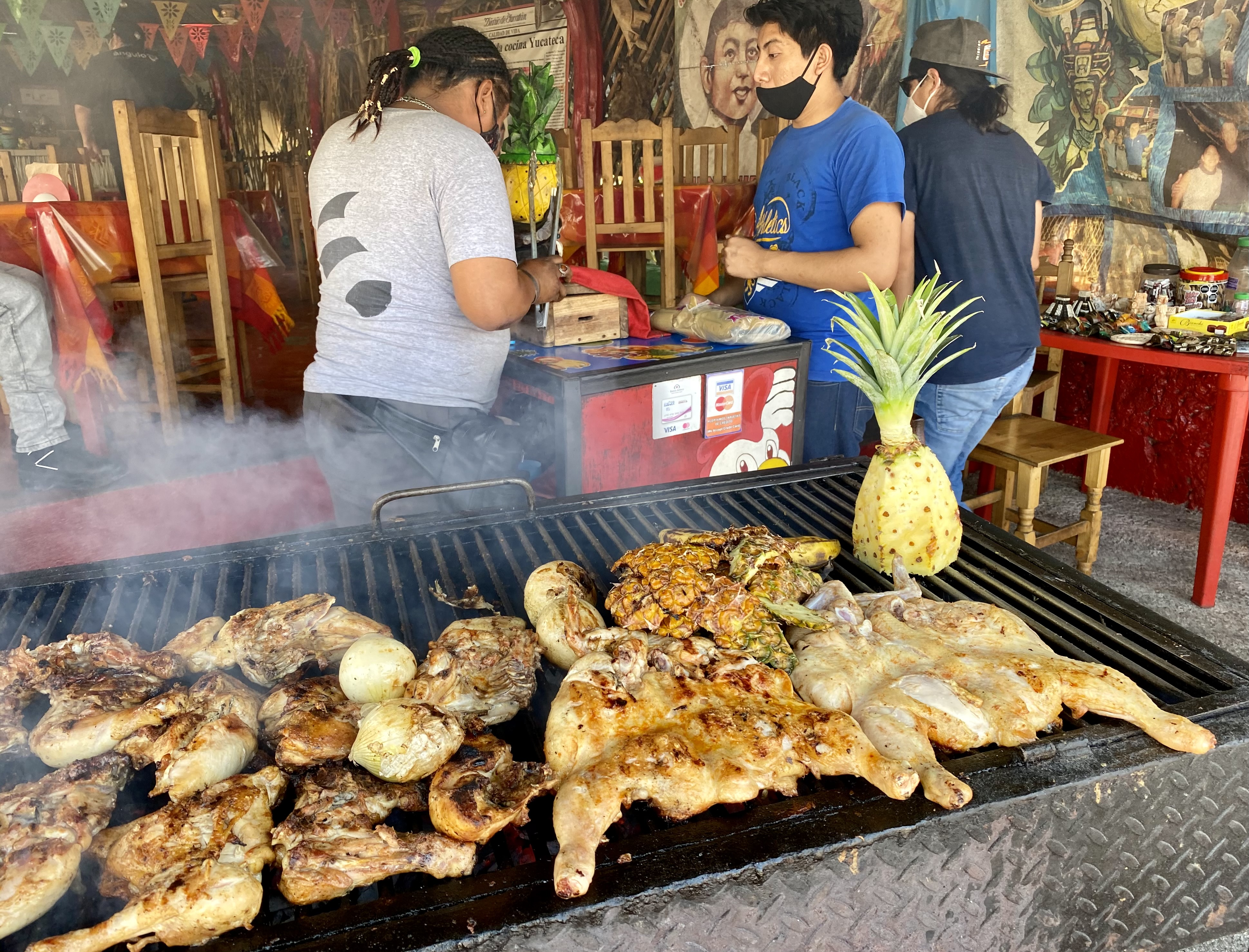
Pollo al carbón being grilled in Pisté, Yucatán, Mexico.

== Description ==
Pollo al carbón is made by charbroiling a whole chicken that has been marinated in a sauce of chili peppers, citrus, and other seasonings. The marinade typically includes limes and oranges, and either serrano peppers or jalapeños. Variations of the recipe may include lemons instead of oranges, and ancho chile, achiote paste, or chile de árbol.

The chicken may be butterflied with the backbone removed before grilling, or it may be cooked on a rotisserie spit. The dish is named "al carbón" because it is traditionally grilled over charcoal.

It is served with condiments such as salsa verde, pico de gallo, salsa roja, and grilled onions. Frijoles charros and pinto beans are common sides.

== See also ==
- Pollo a la brasa, a similar dish from Peru
