= PAG (investment firm) =

Hong Kong investment firm

- Formerly: Pacific Alliance Group
- Type: Private
- Industry: Investment Management
- Founded: 2002; 24 years ago
- Founders: Weijian Shan; Chris Gradel; Jon-Paul Toppino
- Key people: Weijian Shan (executive chairman); Chris Gradel (CEO); Jon-Paul Toppino (president)
- Products: Private Equity; Real Estate; Private credit Hedge Funds
- AUM: US$60 billion (2026)
- Number of employees: 577 (2022)
- Subsidiaries: Polymer Capital Management
- Website: www.pag.com

PAG is a Hong Kong investment firm that manages multiple asset classes, including private equity, private debt, real estate and hedge funds.

In 2023, Private Equity International, ranked PAG as the seventh largest private equity firm in Asia, based on total fundraising over the most recent five-year period.

PAG has offices in Asia-Pacific, London and New York.

== History ==
The origins of PAG come from Pacific Alliance Group, a multi-strategy hedge fund co-founded by Chris Gradel and Horst Geicke in 2002. It currently forms PAG's Credit & Markets business. Millennium Management was one of the initial investors of the firm and went on to invest $150 million for a 20% stake in the firm before Gradel bought it back in 2009.

The Real Assets business grew out of Secured Capital Japan, co-founded in 1997 by Jon-Paul Toppino, a Japanese real estate management company listed on the Tokyo Stock Exchange. In March 2009, PAG acquired a 40% stake in Secured Capital via a convertible bond deal of $46 million. In November 2010, PAG acquired the remaining shares of Secured Capital.

In July 2010, Weijian Shan joined PAG and established the private equity business of the firm.

In the same year, Gradel, Shan and Toppino brought their respective strategies together under the PAG brand.

In 2011 the firm rebranded from Pacific Alliance Group to PAG.

In March 2018, the Blackstone Group acquired a minority stake in PAG.

In 2019, PAG formed Polymer Capital Management, a long/short equity hedge fund.

In March 2022, PAG filed for an initial public offering (IPO) in Hong Kong aiming to raise $2 billion. However, in August 2022, it was reported that it would delayed due to market conditions.

In March 2024, it was reported that the Abu Dhabi Investment Authority was offering to buy out stakes in PAG funds from investors who wanted to exit the China market.

PAG closed its tenth "Asia-focused" real estate fund in February 2025, valued at $4 billion. The fund will focus on property and debt investment expansion in Japan, with a minimum allocation of 60%.

== Asset strategies ==
PAG has three main strategies, namely Private Equity, Real Assets and Credit & Markets.

Its flagship funds are PAG Asia Capital and PAG Growth Capital.

== Notable deals ==
On 13 December 2013, PAG invested $250 million into theme park operator Universal Studios Japan. Other investors in the deal included Goldman Sachs, MBK Partners and Owl Creek.

On 16 June 2014, TPG Capital, PAG and Ontario Teachers’ Pension Plan acquired DTZ from UGL for an enterprise value of US$1.215 billion. On 11 May 2015, DTZ merged with Cushman & Wakefield in a $2 billion deal. On 2 August 2018, Cushman & Wakefield held an IPO and was listed on the New York Stock Exchange under the symbol "CWK".

On 27 June 2014, PAG acquired Commerzbank's Real Estate subsidiary in Japan including a EUR700 million ($954 million) Japanese mezzanine property loan portfolio.

On 21 October 2014, PAG's Secured Capital announced sale of Pacific Century Place Marunouchi in Japan to Singapore's sovereign wealth fund, GIC for US$1.7 billion (S$2.2 billion).

On 5 January 2016, Chinese milk firm Yili Group sold all its remaining right on China Youran Dairy Group to Yogurt Holding I (HK) Limited, a subsidiary of PAG.

On 20 April 2016, Apex Technology and PAG acquired Lexmark for US$3.6 billion.

On 2017, PAG acquired Yingde Gasses, largest independent industrial gases producer in China.

On 11 April 2018, PAG and Joyson Electronics funded Key Safety Systems to successfully complete the acquisition of Air-Bag Maker, Takata for $1.588 billion. The combined company was rebranded Joyson Safety Systems.

On 12 July 2019, PAG acquired Craveable Brands from Archer Capital for $450m.

On 27 August 2020, PAG acquired a 51% stake in Edelweiss Wealth Management (EWM), the second largest non-bank wealth management business in India for US$300 million (INR 22 billion).

On 19 November 2020, PAG signed an agreement to invest up to AUD150 million in Rex Airlines to support the launch of Rex's domestic jet operations scheduled to commence on 1 March 2021.

In April 2021, PAG was merging Yingde Gases Group with Shanghai Baosteel Group, in preparation for a $10 billion offshore IPO. In the same year, PAG completed the acquisition of % Arabica.

In August 2022, PAG announced it has entered into an agreement with H.I.S. Co., Ltd. to acquire Huis Ten Bosch, one of Japan's largest theme parks, for $480 million.

In September 2022, PAG agreed to acquire the Australian food companies Patties Foods and Vesco Foods.

In August 2023, it was reported that PAG would acquire KKR's controlling stake in Australian Venue Co for about A$1.4 billion.

In December 2024, PAG acquired NashTech, a UK-based IT services outsourcing company, from Nash Squared to expand its technology and AI investments.

In October 2026, PAG agreed to acquire a 51% stake in Evergrande Property Services, the property management arm of Evergrande Group, from Evergrande's liquidators for HK$4.03 billion (US$514 million).
