= List of chicken restaurants =

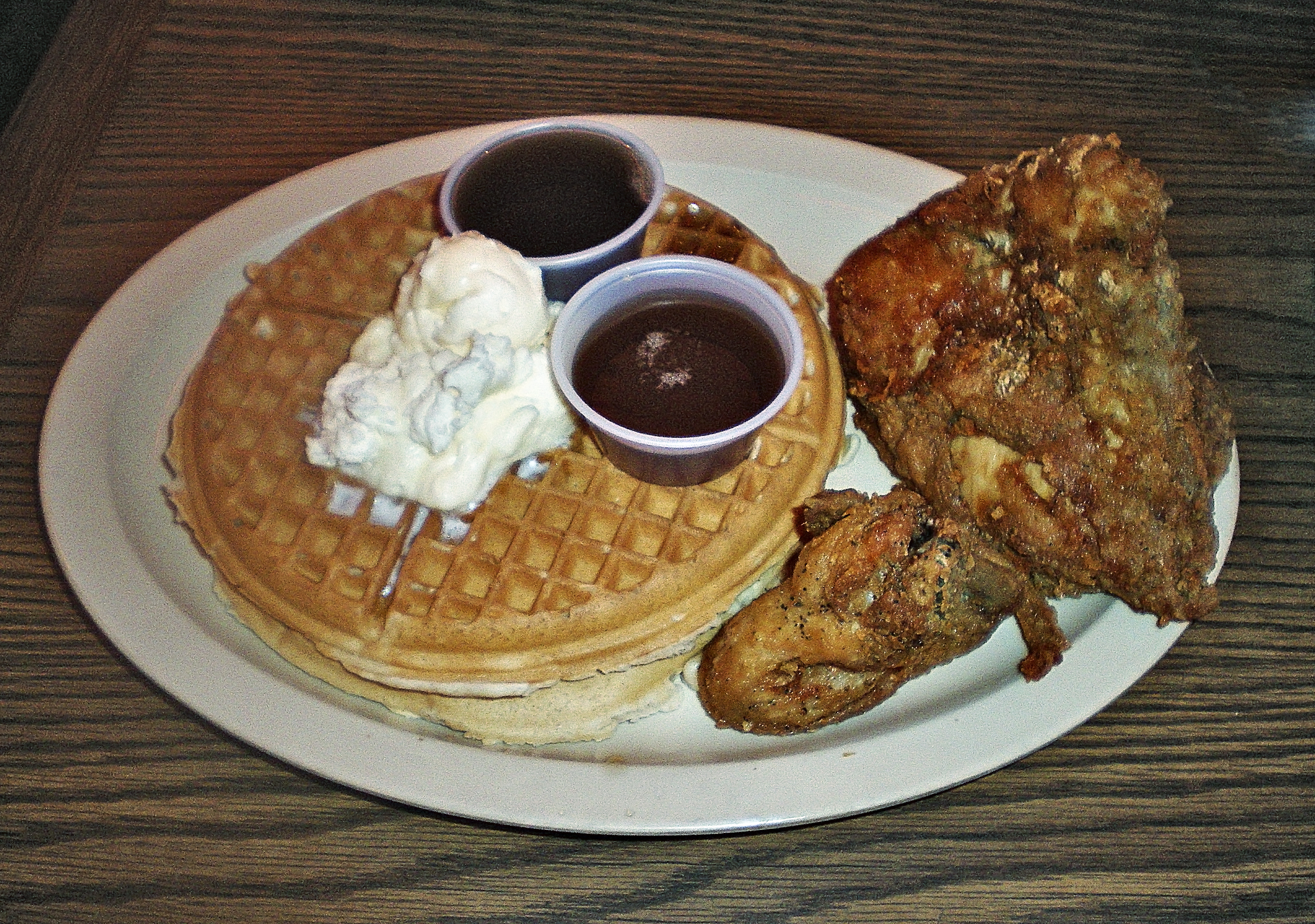
A chicken and waffles dish from Roscoe's House of Chicken and Waffles

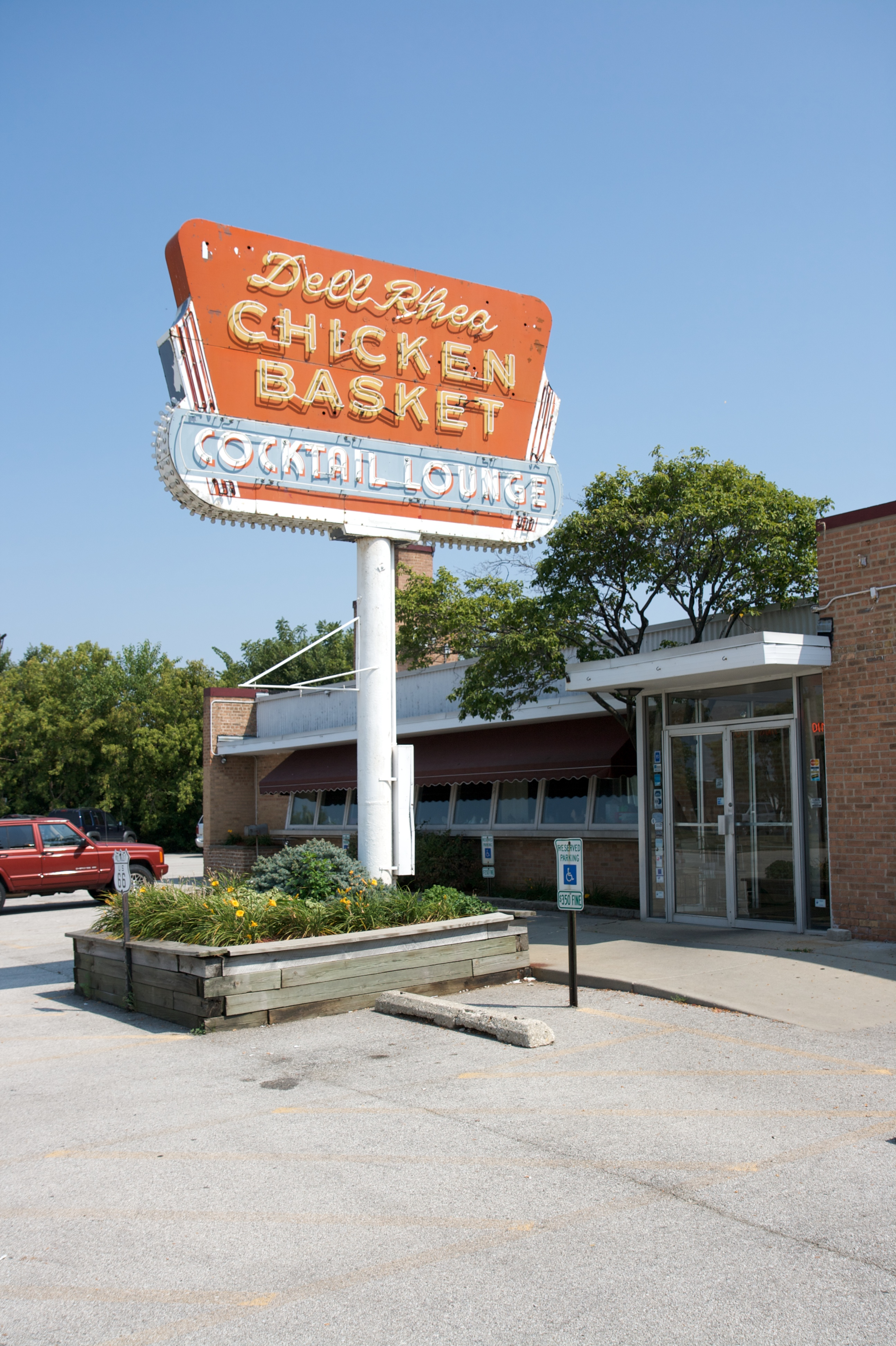
Dell Rhea's Chicken Basket in Willowbrook, Illinois is listed on the U.S. National Register of Historic Places.

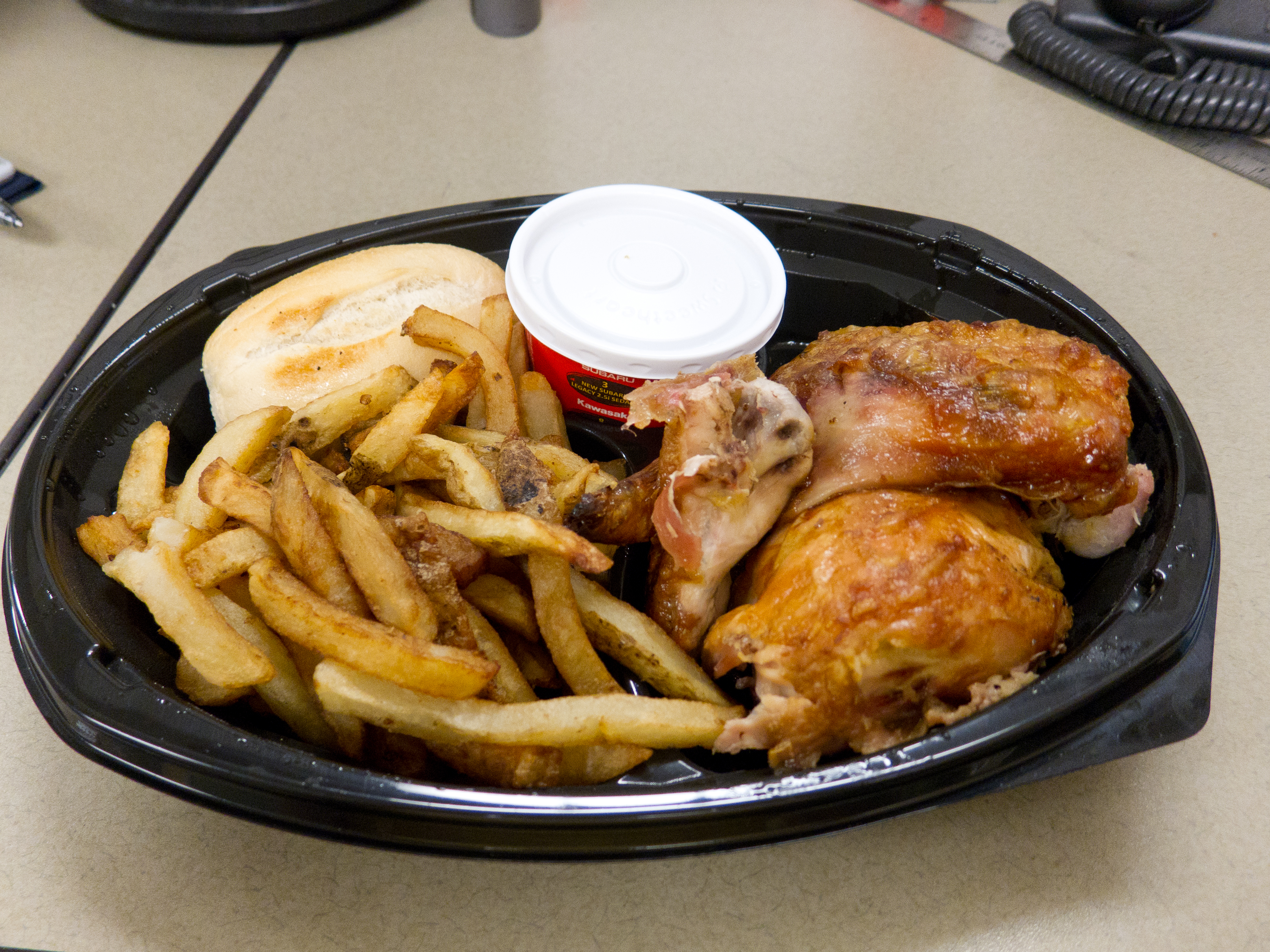
Take-out food from Swiss Chalet in Toronto

This is a list of notable chicken restaurants. This list includes casual dining, fast casual and fast food restaurants which typically specialize in chicken dishes such as Southern fried chicken, chicken and waffles, chicken sandwiches or chicken and biscuits.

== Chicken restaurants ==
- 4 Fingers Crispy Chicken – (Singapore)
- Albaik – (Saudi Arabia)
- Anchor Bar – (United States)
- Baes Fried Chicken – (United States), Portland, Oregon
- Belles Hot Chicken – (Australia)
- Big Chicken – (United States)
- Bonchon Chicken – (South Korea)
- Buffalo Wild Wings – (United States)
- Buffalo Wings and Rings – (United States)
- Champy's Famous Fried Chicken – (United States)
- Chargrill Charlie's – (Australia)
- Chefette – (Barbados)
- Chicken and Guns – (United States), Portland, Oregon
- Chicken in the Rough – (United States)
- Chicken Salad Chick – (United States)
- Chicken Shack – (United States)
- Church's Texas Chicken – (United States)
- Dave's Hot Chicken – (United States)
- Dell Rhea's Chicken Basket – (United States)
- Duff's Famous Wings – (United States)
- El Pollo Loco – (United States)
- Galito's – (South Africa)
- Golden Chick – (United States)
- Grandy's – (United States)
- Gus's World Famous Fried Chicken – (United States)
- The Halal Guys – (United States)
- Hattie B's Hot Chicken – (United States)
- Harold's Chicken Shack – (United States)
- Hen House – (United States)
- Hooters – (United States)
- Hot Chicken Takeover – (United States)
- Joella's Hot Chicken (United States)
- Jojo – (United States)
- Jollibee – (Philippines)
- KFC – (United States)
- Knott's Chicken Dinner Restaurant – (United States)
- LoRell's Chicken Shack
- Mary Brown's – (Canada)
- Max's Restaurant – (Philippines)
- Ma Yu Ching's Bucket Chicken House – (China)
- Miss Millie's – (United Kingdom)
- Mt. Joy – (United States)
- Nando's – (South Africa)
- Pollo Campero – (Guatemala)
- Pollo Palenque – (United States)
- Pollo Tropical – (United States)
- Popeyes – (United States)
- Prince's Hot Chicken Shack – (United States)
- Quaker Steak & Lube – (United States)
- Quick Pack Food Mart, Seattle
- Roscoe's House of Chicken and Waffles – (United States)
- Rostipollos – (Costa Rica)
- Siipiweikot – (Finland)
- St-Hubert – (Canada)
- Scores – (Canada)
- Slim Chickens – (United States)
- Smithfield's Chicken 'N Bar-B-Q – (United States)
- Swiss Chalet – (Canada)
- The Chicken Supply , Seattle
- Tip-Top Restaurant – (Nicaragua)
- White Fence Farm – (United States)
- Wild Wing Cafe – (United States)
- Wingstop – (United States)
- World Famous Hotboys
- Zehnder's – (United States)

=== Fast-food chicken restaurants ===
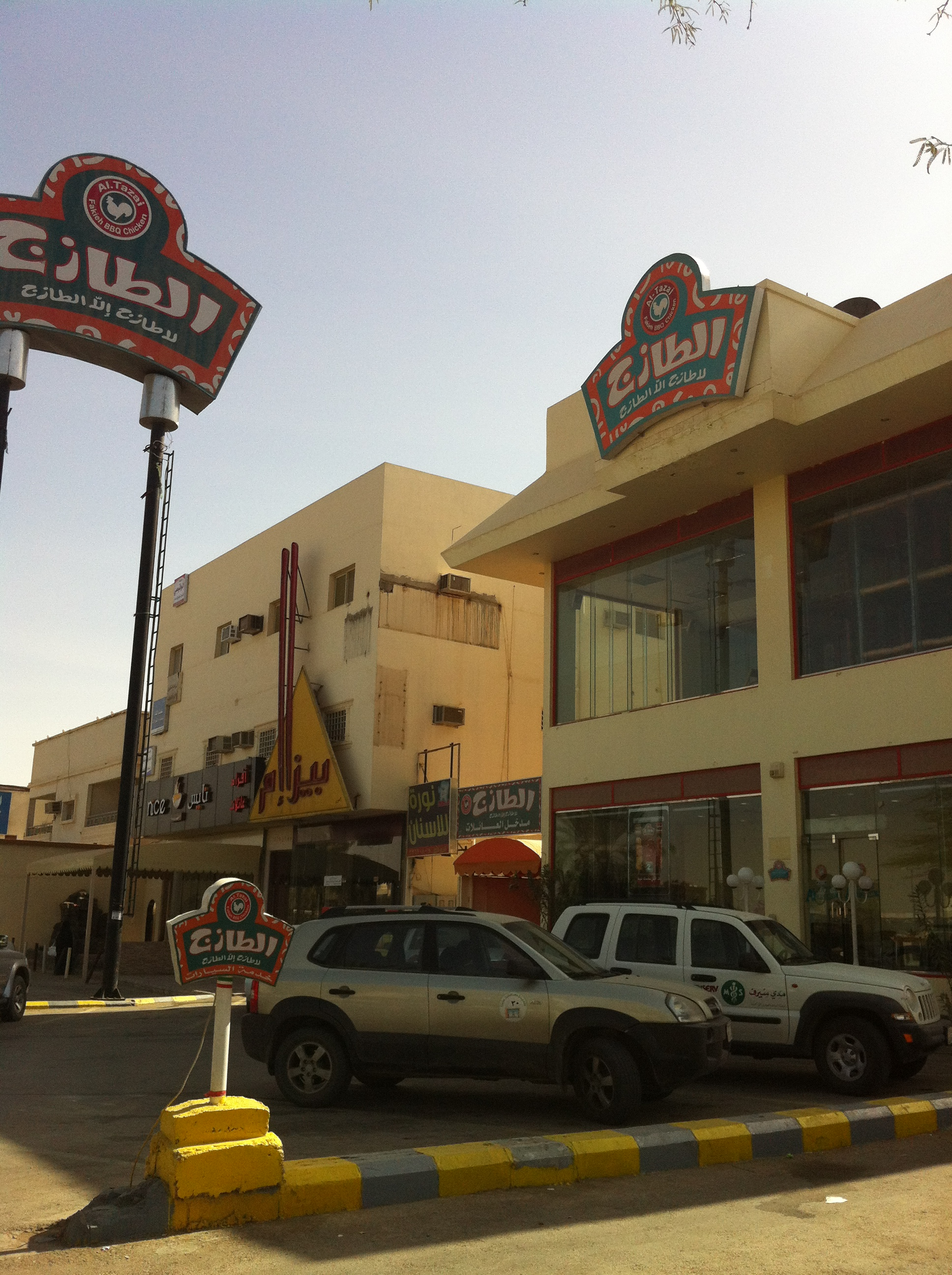
An Al Tazaj restaurant in Buraidah, Saudi Arabia

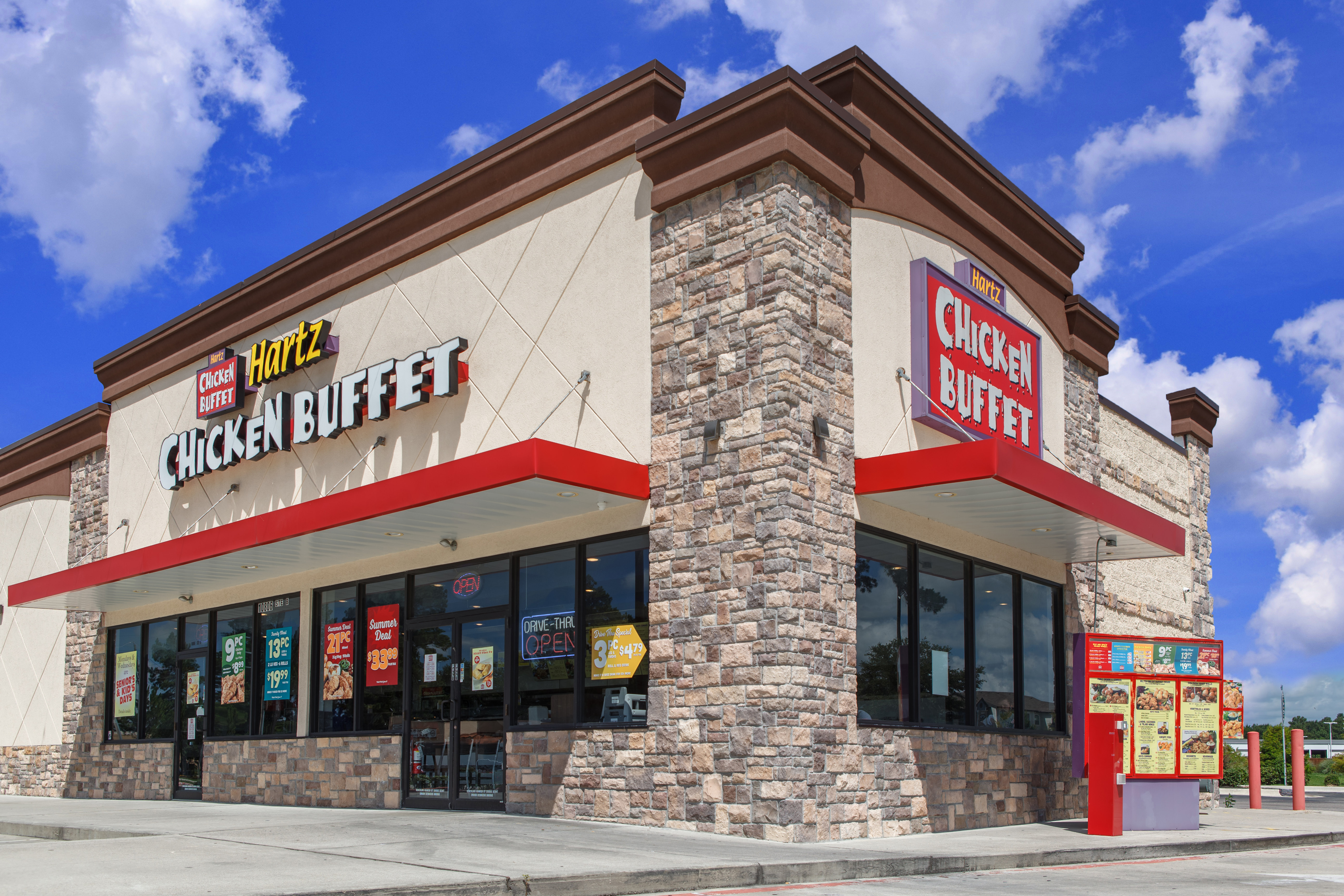
Hartz Chicken Buffet in Tomball, Texas, U.S.

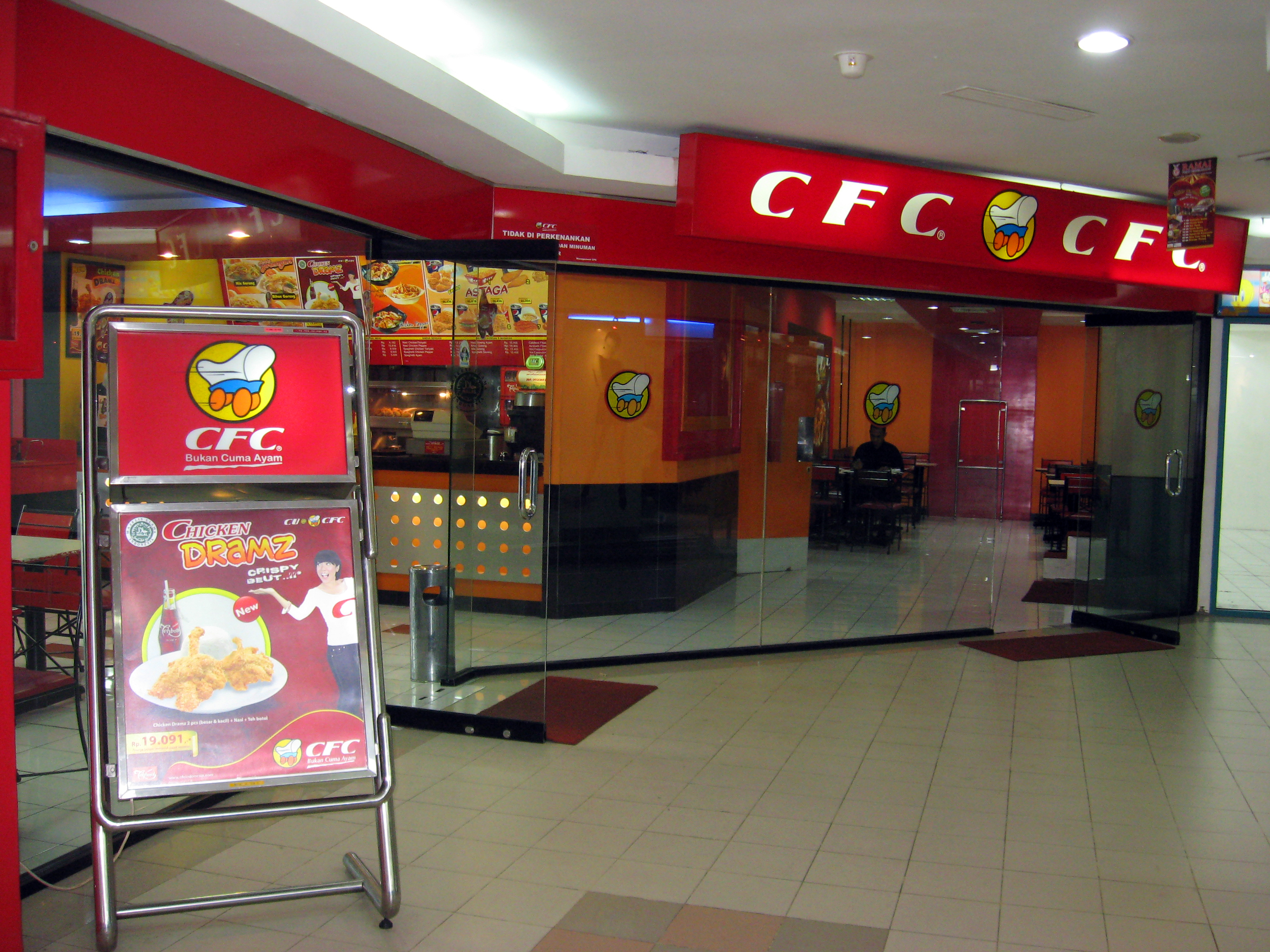
A California Fried Chicken location in Yogyakarta, Java, Indonesia

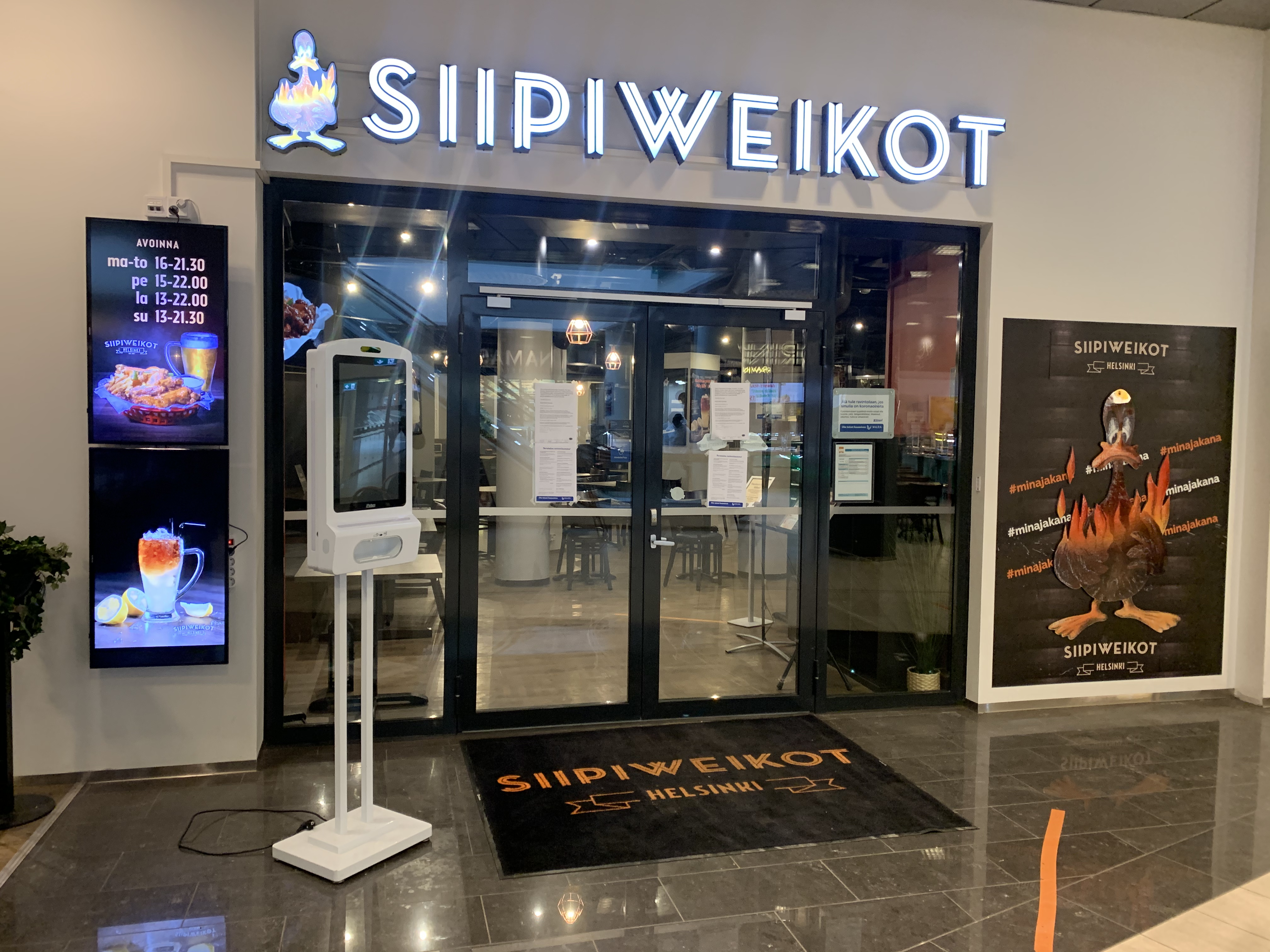
Entrance of Siipiweikot restaurant in Kaisaniemi, Helsinki, Finland

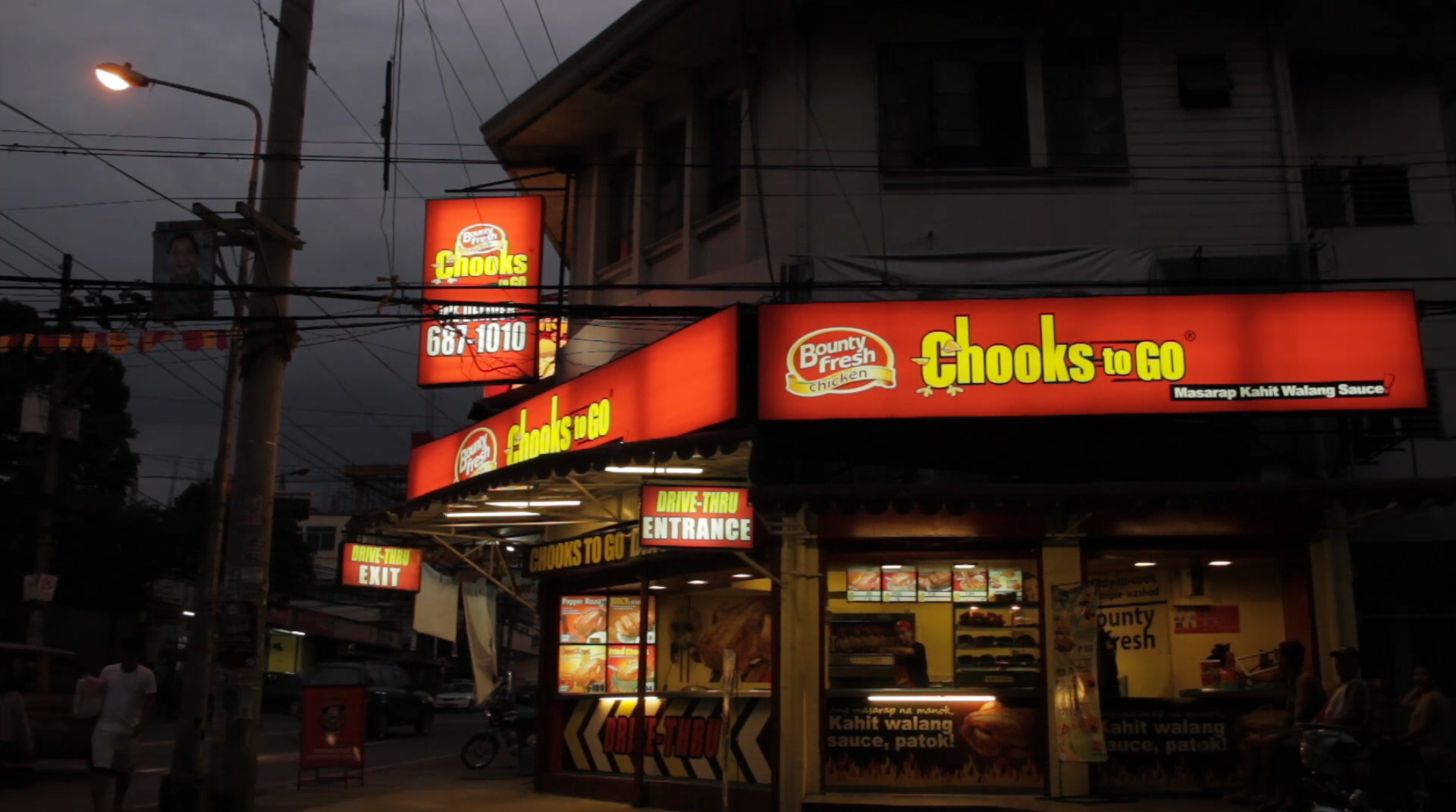
A Chooks-to-Go restaurant in the Philippines

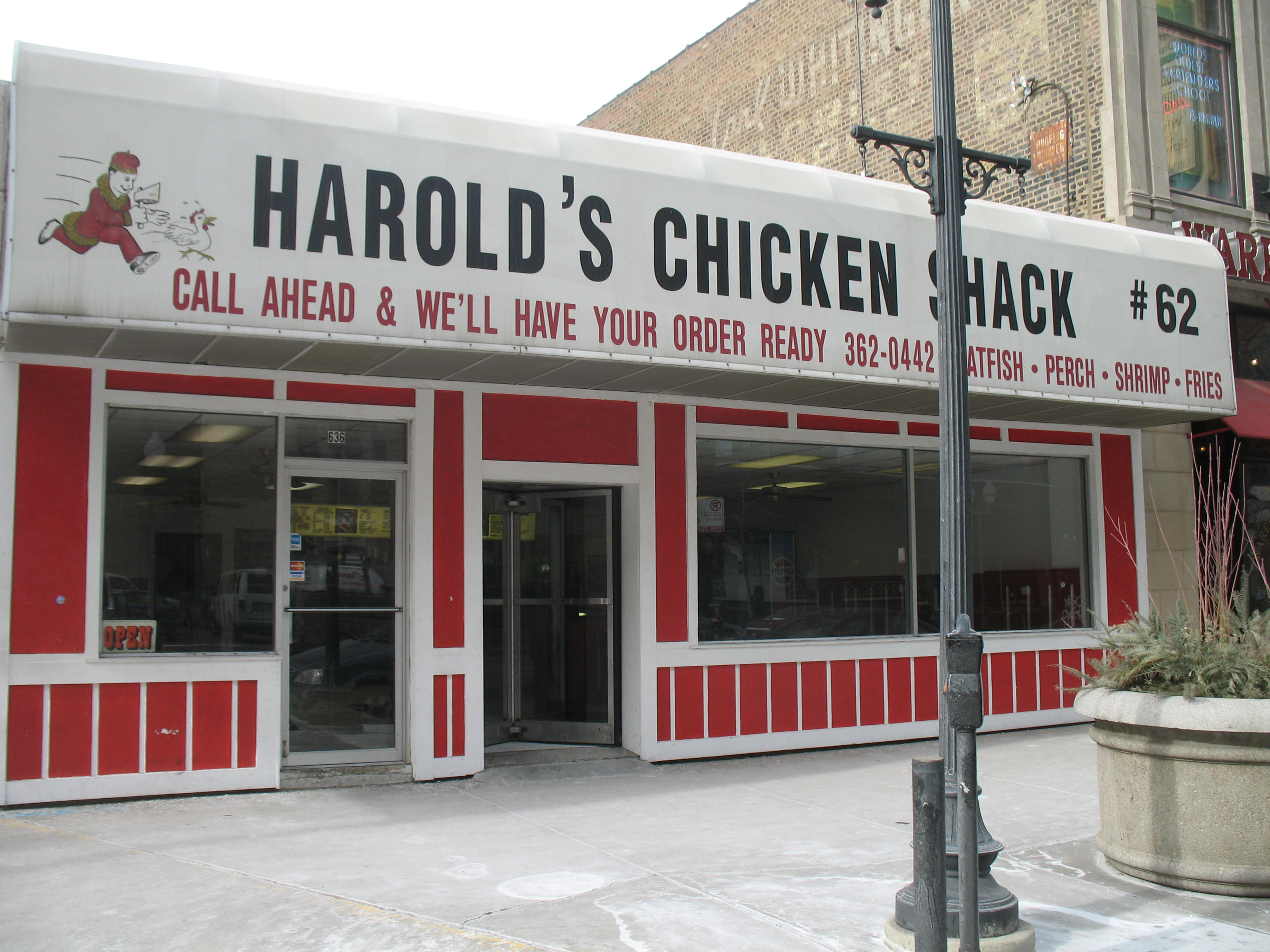
Harold's Chicken Shack in Chicago

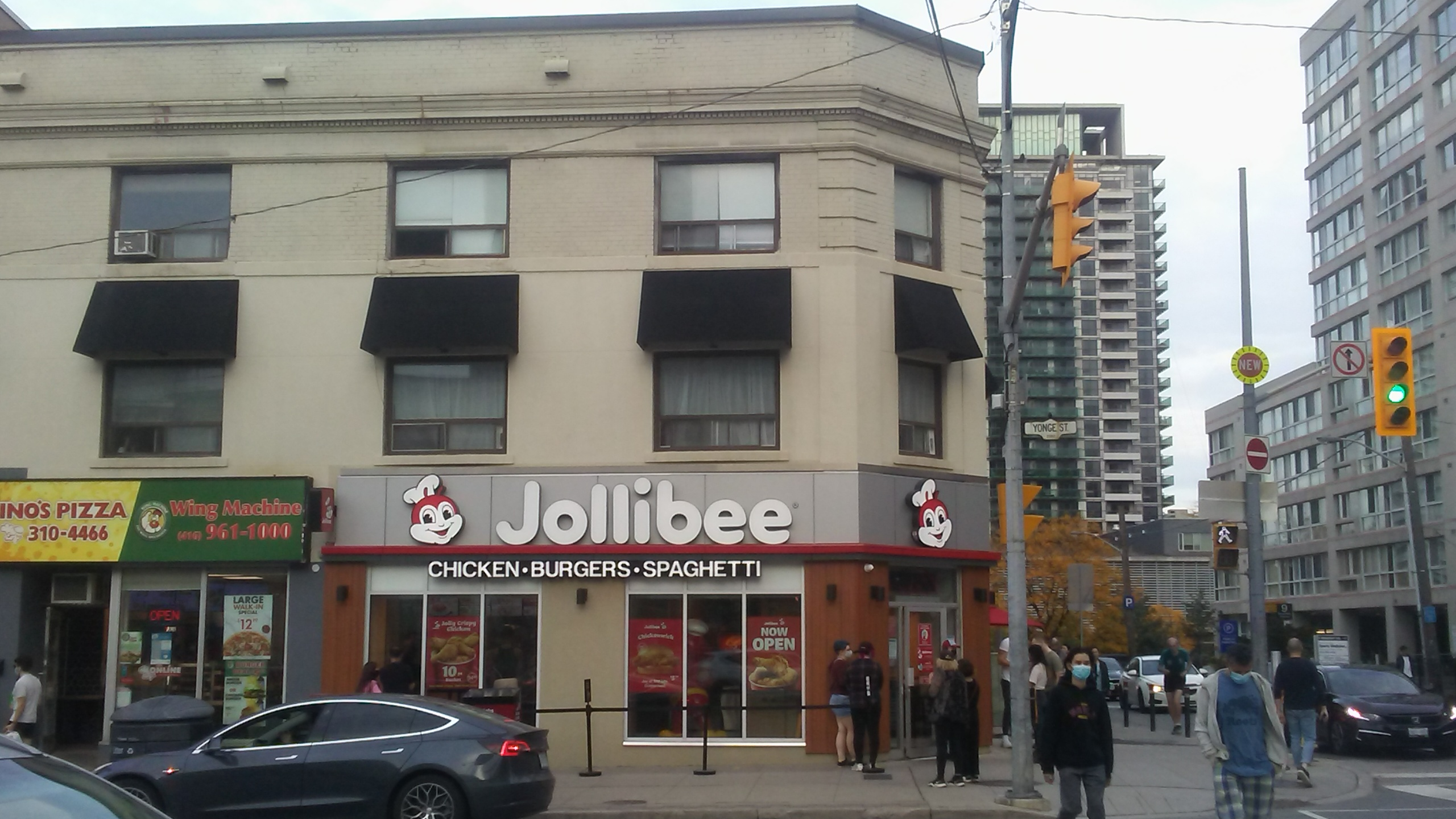
Jollibee, a Filipinos-owned fast food chain, in Toronto, Ontario, Canada

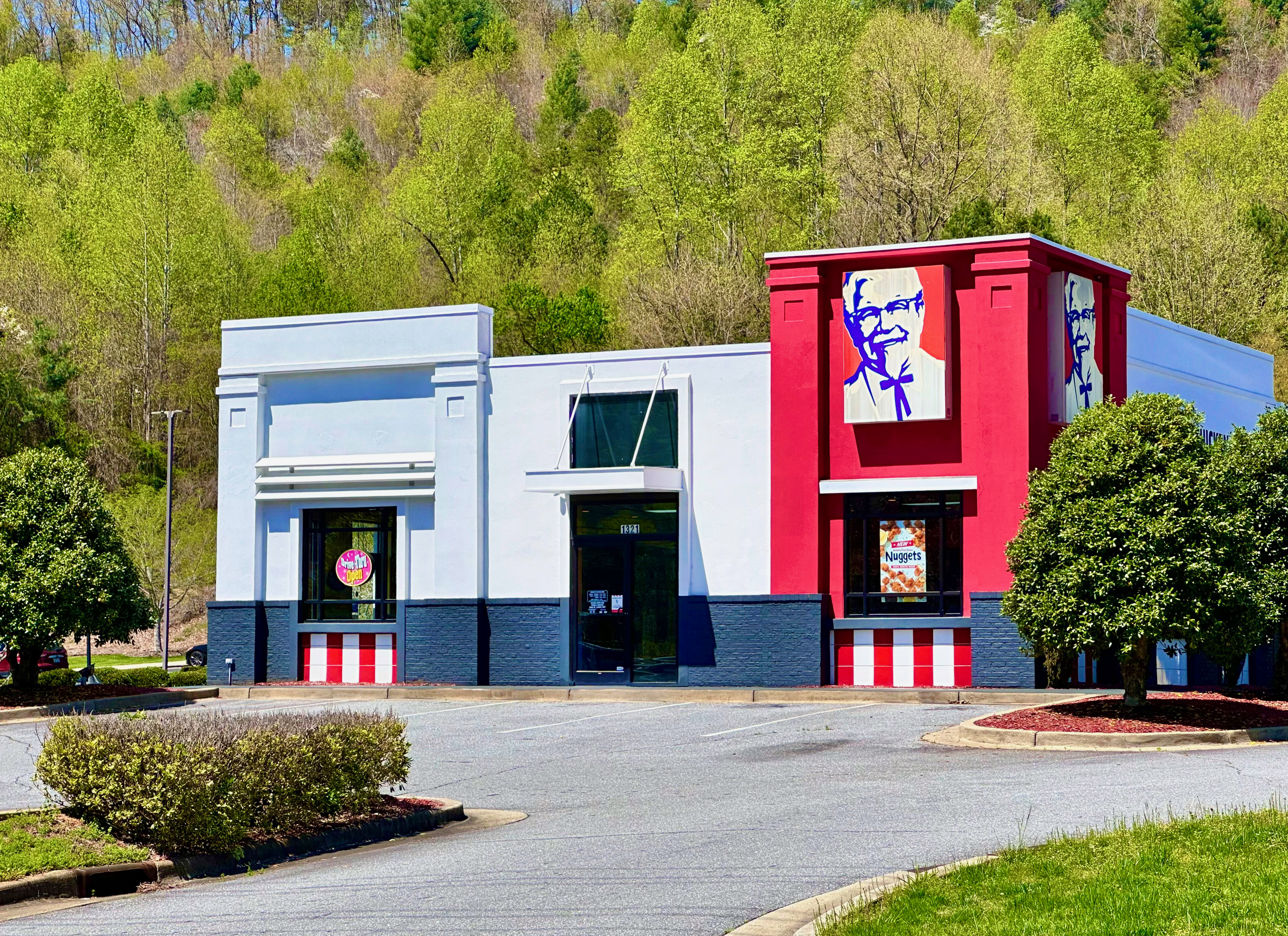
A modern KFC restaurant in Murphy, North Carolina

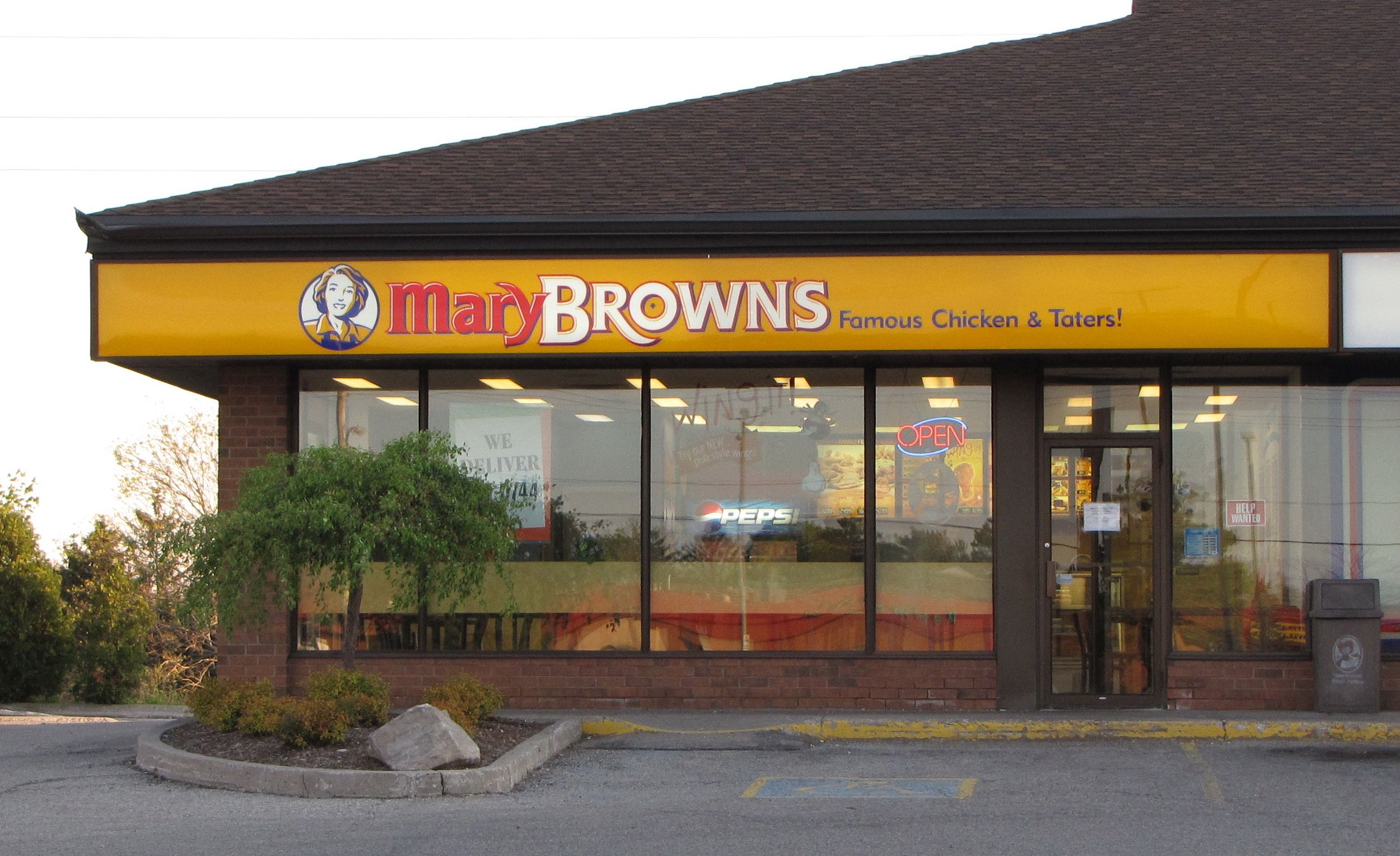
A Mary Brown's restaurant in Guelph, Ontario, Canada

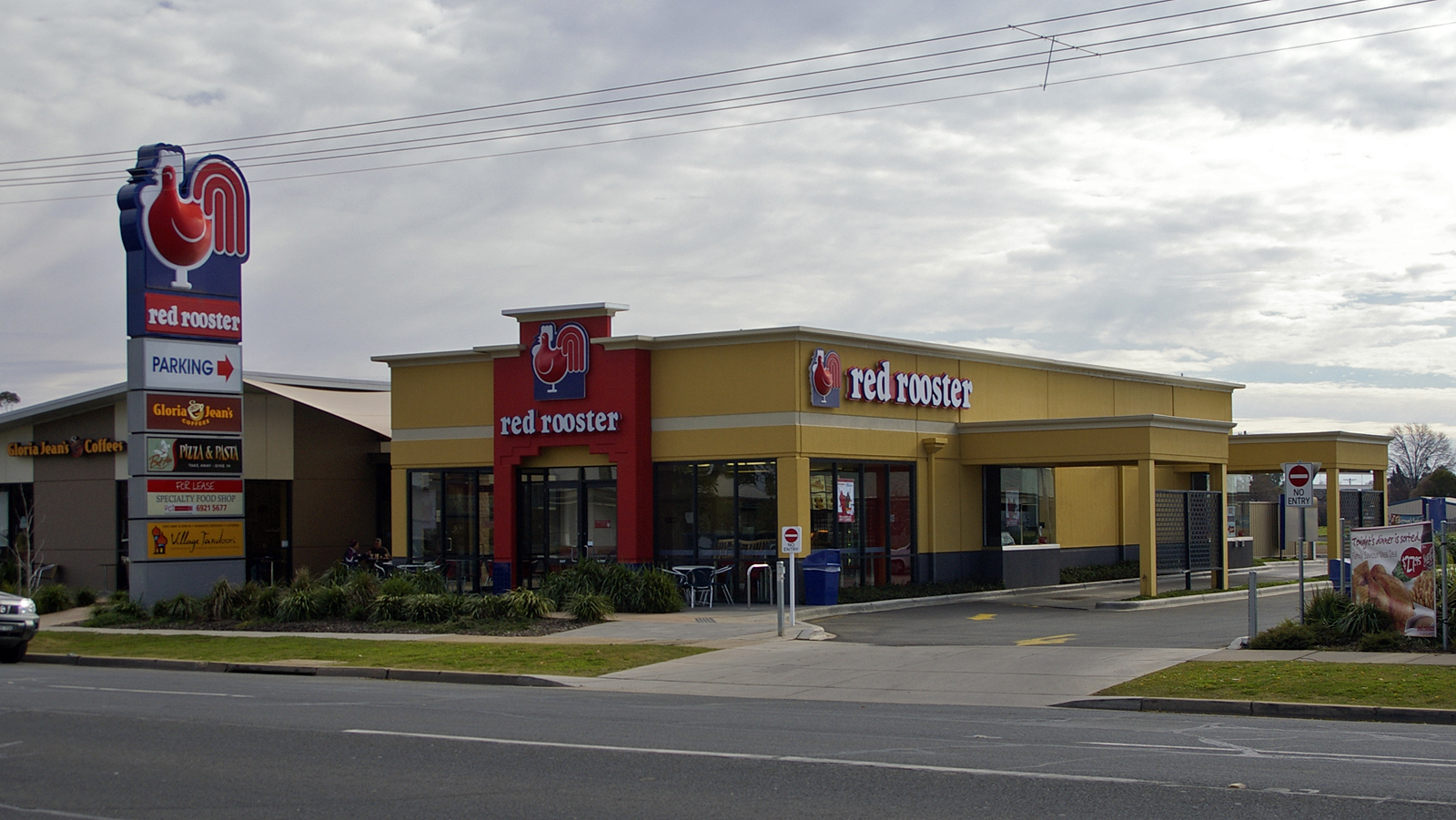
A Red Rooster restaurant in Wagga Wagga, New South Wales, Australia

- Albaik – (Saudi Arabia)
- Al Tazaj – (Jordan)
- Belles Hot Chicken – (Australia)
- Bacolod Chicken Inasal
- Bojangles – (United States)
- Boston Market – (United States)
- Brown's Chicken & Pasta – (United States)
- Bush's Chicken – (United States)
- California Fried Chicken – (Indonesia)
- Chefette – (Barbados)
- Chester's – (United States)
- Chick-fil-A – (United States)
- Chick'nCone – (United States)
- Chicken Cottage – (United Kingdom)
- Chicken Delight – (United States)
- Chicken Express – (United States)
- Chicken Licken – (South Africa)
- Chicken Republic – (Nigeria)
- The Chicken Rice Shop – (Malaysia)
- Chicken Shack – (United States)
- Chicken Treat – (Australia)
- ChicKing – (Emirate of Dubai)
- Chooks-to-Go – (Philippines)
- Church's Chicken – (United States)
- Cluck-U Chicken – (United States)
- Dixie Lee Fried Chicken – (Canada)
- Dixy Chicken – (United Kingdom)
- El Pollo Loco – (United States)
- Ezell's Chicken – (United States)
- Foosackly's – (United States)
- Fosters Freeze – (United States)
- Frisby – (Colombia)
- Geprek Bensu – (Indonesia)
- Golden Chick – (United States)
- Golden Skillet – (United States)
- Guthrie's – (United States)
- Harold's Chicken Shack – (United States)
- Hartz Chicken – (United States)
- HNT Chicken – (Brazil)
- J&G Fried Chicken – (Taiwan)
- Jollibee – (Philippines)
- Juan Pollo – (United States)
- Kennedy Fried Chicken – (United States)
- Kenny Rogers Roasters – (Malaysia, Philippines)
- KFC – (United States)
- KLG – (Malaysia, Taiwan).
- Krispy Krunchy Chicken – (United States)
- Kudu – (Saudi Arabia)
- Kyochon – (South Korea)
- Lee's Famous Recipe Chicken – (United States)
- Louisiana Fried Chicken – (United States)
- Mang Inasal – (Philippines)
- Marrybrown – (Malaysia)
- Martin's BBQ – (United States)
- Mary Brown's – (Canada)
- Max's of Manila – (Philippines)
- Morley's – (United Kingdom)
- Mrs. Winner's Chicken & Biscuits – (United States)
- Oporto – (Australia)
- Pelicana Chicken – (South Korea)
- Pollo Brujo – ten locations in Guatemala; also in Colombia, Costa Rica and Mexico
- Pollo Campero – (Guatemala) – based in Guatemala
- Pollos Frisby – (Colombia)
- Popeyes Louisiana Kitchen – (United States)
- Pudgie's – (United States)
- Raising Cane's Chicken Fingers – (United States)
- Red Rooster – (Australia)
- Richeese Factory – (Indonesia)
- Rostic's – (Russia)
- Roy Rogers Restaurants – (United States)
- SCR – (Malaysia)
- Slim Chickens – (United States)
- Southern Fried Chicken – (United Kingdom)
- Tastee Fried Chicken
- TKK Fried Chicken – (Taiwan)
- Wienerwald – (Germany)
- Wild Wing Restaurants – (Canada)
- Wing Zone – (United States)
- WingStreet
- Wingstop – (United States)
- YaYa's Flame Broiled Chicken – (United States)
- Zankou Chicken – (United States)
- Zaxby's – (United States)

=== Defunct chicken restaurants ===
- Chicken George – (United States)
- Chooks Fresh & Tasty – (Australia)
- Coon Chicken Inn – (United States)
- Koo Koo Roo – (United States)
- Maryland Fried Chicken – (United States)
- Minnie Pearl's Fried Chicken
- Pioneer Chicken – (United States)
- Sisters Chicken & Biscuits – (United States)
- White Coffee Pot – (United States)

== See also ==
- Fried chicken restaurant
- Hofbrau
- List of chicken dishes
- List of fried chicken dishes
- List of fast food restaurant chains
- List of restaurant chains
- Lists of restaurants
- Los Pollos Hermanos, a fictional chicken restaurant
- National Fried Chicken Day
- Chicken as food
