= Chicken shack =

A chicken shack is a restaurant that primarily serves chicken, usually fried.

The term may also refer to:

- Chicken Shack, English blues band
- Chick'n Shack, Shake Shack chicken sandwich
- Harold's Chicken Shack, American restaurant chain in Chicago, Illinois
- Chicken Shack (Michigan), American restaurant chain in metro Detroit, Michigan
- Jimmie's Chicken Shack, American alternative rock band from Annapolis, Maryland
- "Chicken Shack Boogie", 1948 jump blues song by Amos Milburn
- Back at the Chicken Shack, 1960 album by jazz organist Jimmy Smith
- "Back at the Chicken Shack" (song), song by organist Jimmy Smith, covered by many artists

== See also ==
- Chicken coop, housing for chickens
