= Bush's Chicken =

American fast food chain

- Company type: Private
- Industry: Restaurants Franchising
- Genre: Fast food
- Founded: 1996; 30 years ago
- Founders: Keith and Charlene Bush
- Headquarters: Waco, Texas, U.S.
- Number of locations: 75 stores
- Area served: Texas
- Key people: Patrick J. Clarke (CEO)
- Products: Fried chicken, fried okra, fries, mashed potatoes, corn nuggets, jalapeño poppers, yeast rolls and macaroni and cheese
- Revenue: ▲US$231 Million (2021)
- Number of employees: 1,000 (2021)
- Website: Official website

Bush's Chicken (stylized as Bush's Chicken!) is a fast food restaurant serving fried chicken. The company is headquartered in Waco, Texas and has over 75 franchise locations in Central, North, South, and West Texas. The chain serves fried chicken, fried okra, fries, mashed potatoes, corn nuggets, jalapeño poppers, yeast rolls and macaroni and cheese. Bush's Chicken also sells sweet and unsweet iced tea by the gallon jug.

== History ==
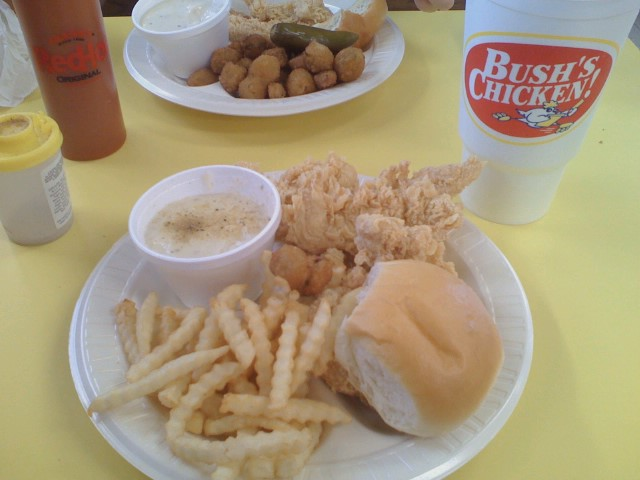
Chicken strips, mashed potato, fries and roll from Bush's Chicken

The first Bush's Chicken was opened in 1996 in Waco, Texas by Keith Bush. The chain was sold to Hammock Partners, L.L.C. in 2005. The headquarters was moved to Austin that same year. In 2011 Keith Bush's son, Corey Bush, purchased three of the chain's restaurants. After a change in ownership in 2015, headquarters relocated back to Waco.

In December 2012 the restaurant was hit with a lawsuit. The customer accused the restaurant of serving her husband tainted chicken from which he died. Bush's was later cleared of wrongdoing based on medical evidence presented at the trial.

== See also ==
- List of fast-food chicken restaurants
- List of fast food restaurant chains
