= Wing Zone =

American restaurant chain

Wing Zone Franchise Corporation
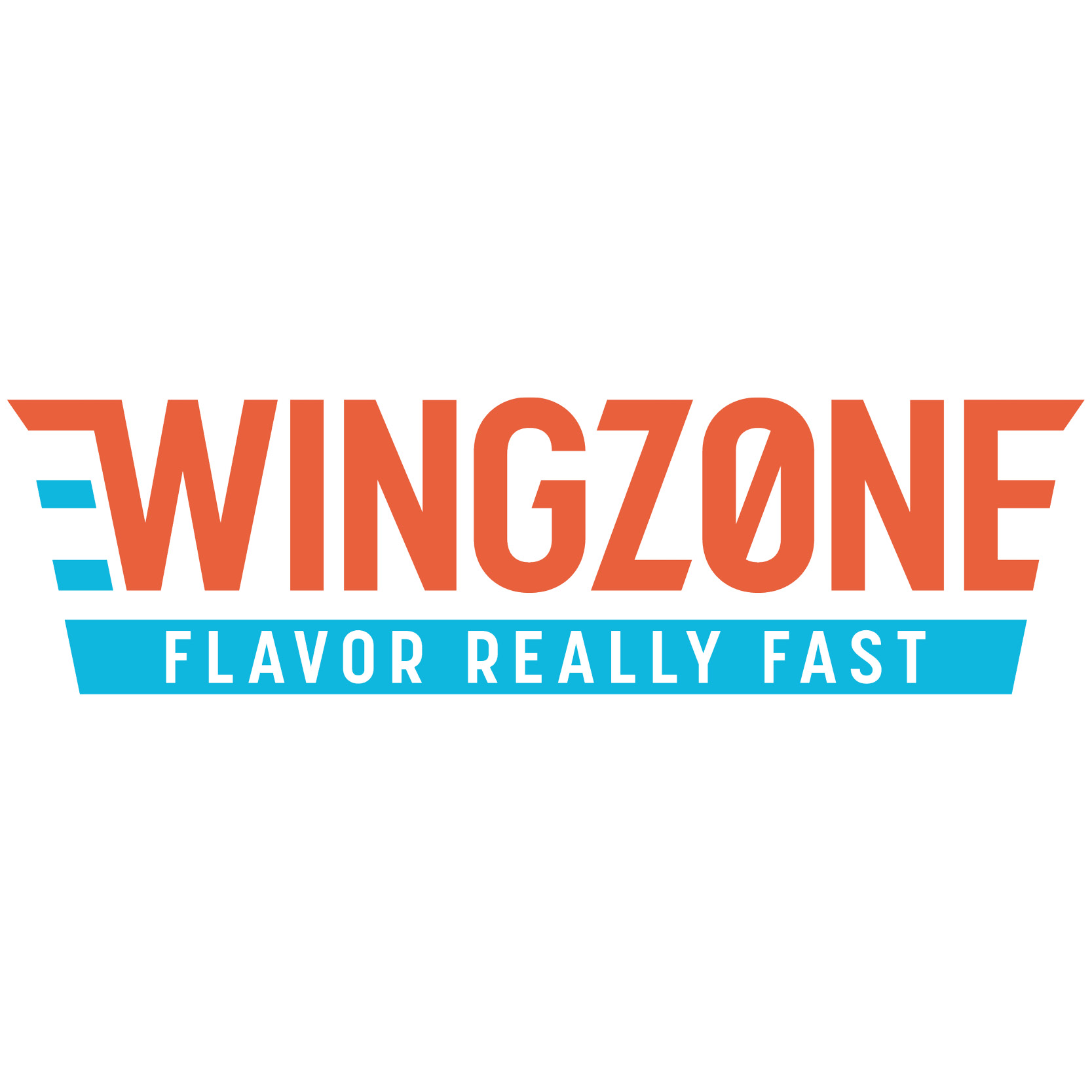
- Company type: Take-Out / Delivery Restaurant
- Industry: Restaurants
- Founded: 1991; 35 years ago in Gainesville, Florida, US.
- Headquarters: Las Vegas, Nevada, U.S.
- Area served: United States; Philippines; Panama; Saudi Arabia; Malaysia; Malabo; Colombia; Singapore; Guatemala
- Key people: Ashley Morris, CEO; Jason Smylie, President
- Products: Buffalo Wings; Sandwiches; Chicken fingers
- Owner: Capriotti's
- Website: wingzone.com

Wing Zone is an American, Las Vegas-based chain of restaurants, owned by Capriotti's, that specializes in chicken wings and burgers. The chain has over 30 restaurants in the United States and over 60 internationally. In 2022, Capriotti's announced that Wing Zone will be expanding with 50 new locations into India.

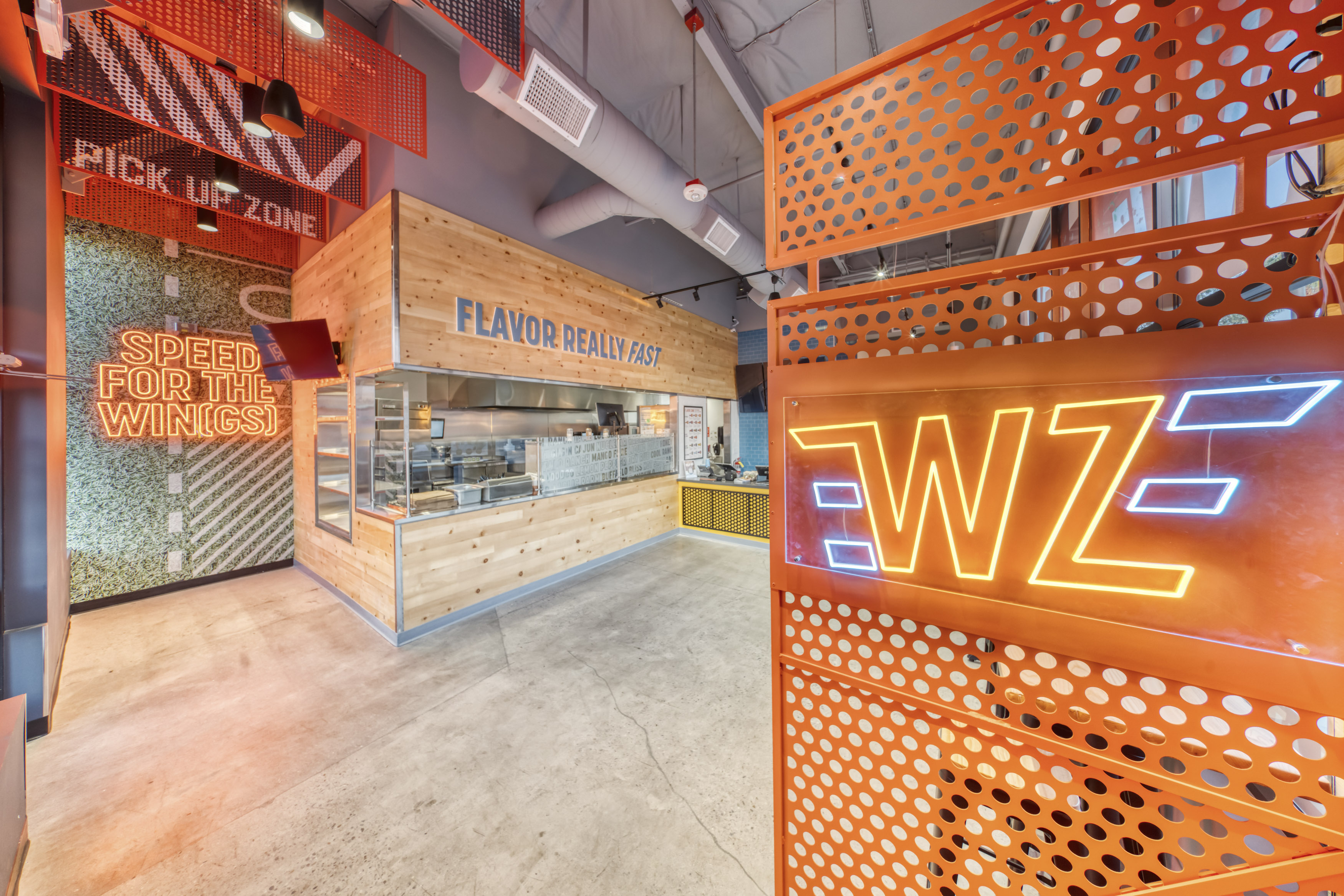
Interior of a Wing Zone in Las Vegas

== History ==
The Wing Zone was founded in 1991 by Matt Friedman and Adam Scott, two students at the University of Florida. The two partners took over their fraternity kitchen at night and began developing their recipes. Friedman and Scott opened up their first two locations in Gainesville, Florida, in 1993. As of 2014, Wing Zone has opened eight locations in Panama City, Panama. In 2014, Wing Zone opened their second international location in San Pedro Sula, Honduras. In 2015, Wing Zone opened their third international location in Guatemala City, Guatemala. In 2021, Capriotti's purchased the company and relocated the headquarters to Las Vegas.

== Flavors and Services ==
The restaurant offers multiple and savory options to choose from, like "Honey Q," "Liquid Gold," and "Blackened Voodoo" among others.

== See also ==
- Buffalo wings
- List of fast-food chicken restaurants
