= Golden Chick =

American restaurant chain

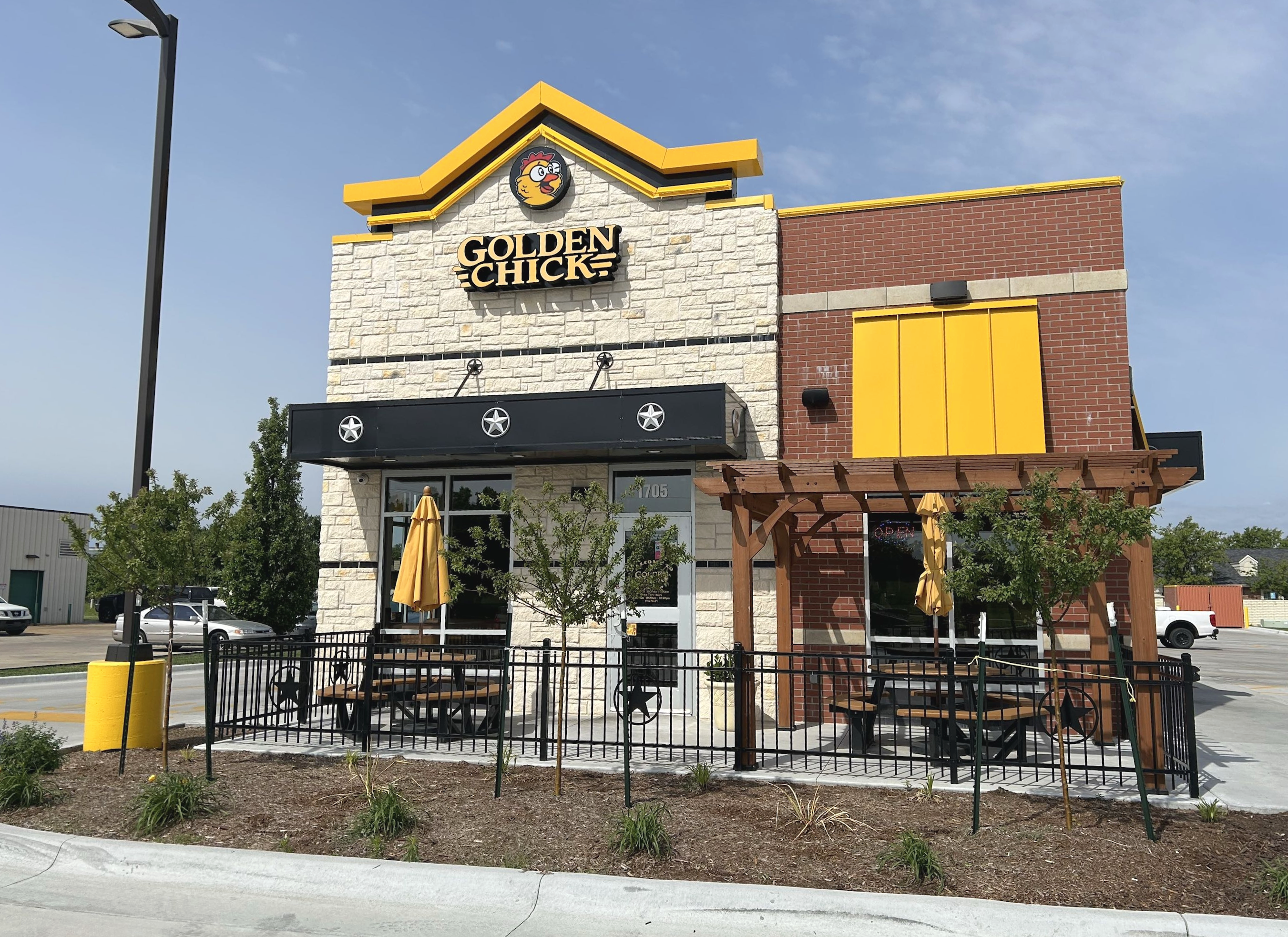
- A Golden Chick restaurant in Wichita, Kansas (2026)
- Type: Subsidiary
- Industry: Restaurant franchising
- Founded: 1967; 59 years ago San Marcos, Texas, US
- Headquarters: Richardson, Texas
- Number of locations: 210 (2022)
- Areas served: United States
- Key people: David Rutkowski (CFO); Mark Parmerlee (President (corporate title)); Howard Terry (CMO); Brian Loescher (COO)
- Products: Fried chicken
- Revenue: $155.4 million
- Parent: Golden Southern LLC
- Website: goldenchick.com

Golden Chick, formerly known as Golden Fried Chicken, is a quick-service fried chicken restaurant franchise headquartered in Richardson, Texas. Mark Parmerlee, head of Golden Tree Restaurants serves as the President and Chairman.

== History ==
The first restaurant was in 1967 in San Marcos, Texas, under the name Golden Fried Chicken. Franchising started in 1972. A decade later, the franchise grew to a number of restaurants primarily in Central Texas, with a focus on cities like Houston, Austin and San Antonio. Eventually it expanded outside to the Dallas-Fort Worth Metroplex, and then crossed the state line into Oklahoma. There are currently 211 restaurants operating in Texas, Oklahoma, Georgia, Louisiana, Mississippi, and Florida. In 2022, Golden Chick was included in Nation's Restaurant News' Top 200 Restaurant Brands in the U.S. (#142). Focused on innovation and growth, Golden Chick recently completed its third modular constructed restaurant.

Since 1985, the chain's flagship menu item has been its chicken strips, trademarked as Golden Tenders. In 1996, Golden Fried Chicken abbreviated to its present name, Golden Chick. The family-oriented brand is the creator of the Original Golden Tenders® and the Big & Golden™ Chicken Sandwich, along with other chef-inspired menu items including its Golden Roast Chicken and Zagat-recognized Chicken Salad.

In 2017, Golden Chick celebrated its 50th anniversary, and sponsored Texas Country Reporter.

The parent company of Golden Chick, Golden Tree Restaurants, has other subsidiaries: Heff's Burgers, Jalapeño Tree, JC's Burger House, Texadelphia and Fireside Pies.

== See also ==
- List of fast-food chicken restaurants
