= HNT Chicken =

Brazilian fast food restaurant chain

- Industry: Restaurants
- Founded: 2014; 12 years ago
- Headquarters: Rio de Janeiro, Brazil
- Area served: Brazil, United States
- Key people: Dany Levkovits (CEO)
- Products: Fast food, including: Brazilian food · chicken
- Website: www.hntchicken.com

HNT Chicken (short for "Hot 'n' Tender") is a Brazilian fast-food chain incorporated in 2014 by Dany Levkovits. Its first store located in Rio de Janeiro opened in 1995. The company has 39 chains across eight Brazilian states. The company began looking toward expansion in 2015 and opened its first United States expansion in Philadelphia in December 2019.

== History ==
The first restaurant was opened in 1995 in Rio de Janeiro and expanded to 39 locations across Brazil. The chain was incorporated in 2014 and its CEO is Dany Levkovits. After looking to expand in 2015, the company established a venture with 19-year-old Ronak Pandya, son of entrepreneur and restaurateur Jay Pandya, who owns dozens of restaurants in New Jersey, New York and Connecticut. Private equity fund, Moonbeam Capital Investments, is funding HNT's expansion into the United States East Coast.

The company is projected to open 65 locations "by the end of 2020 and 100 by June 2021". The franchise is expected to open 1,000 jobs. Between 40-50 locations are expected to open in the Philadelphia region. The first restaurant expansion in the region opened in December 2019 near Philadelphia Mills.

== See also ==
- List of chicken restaurants
