= Chicken in the Rough =

America restaurant chain

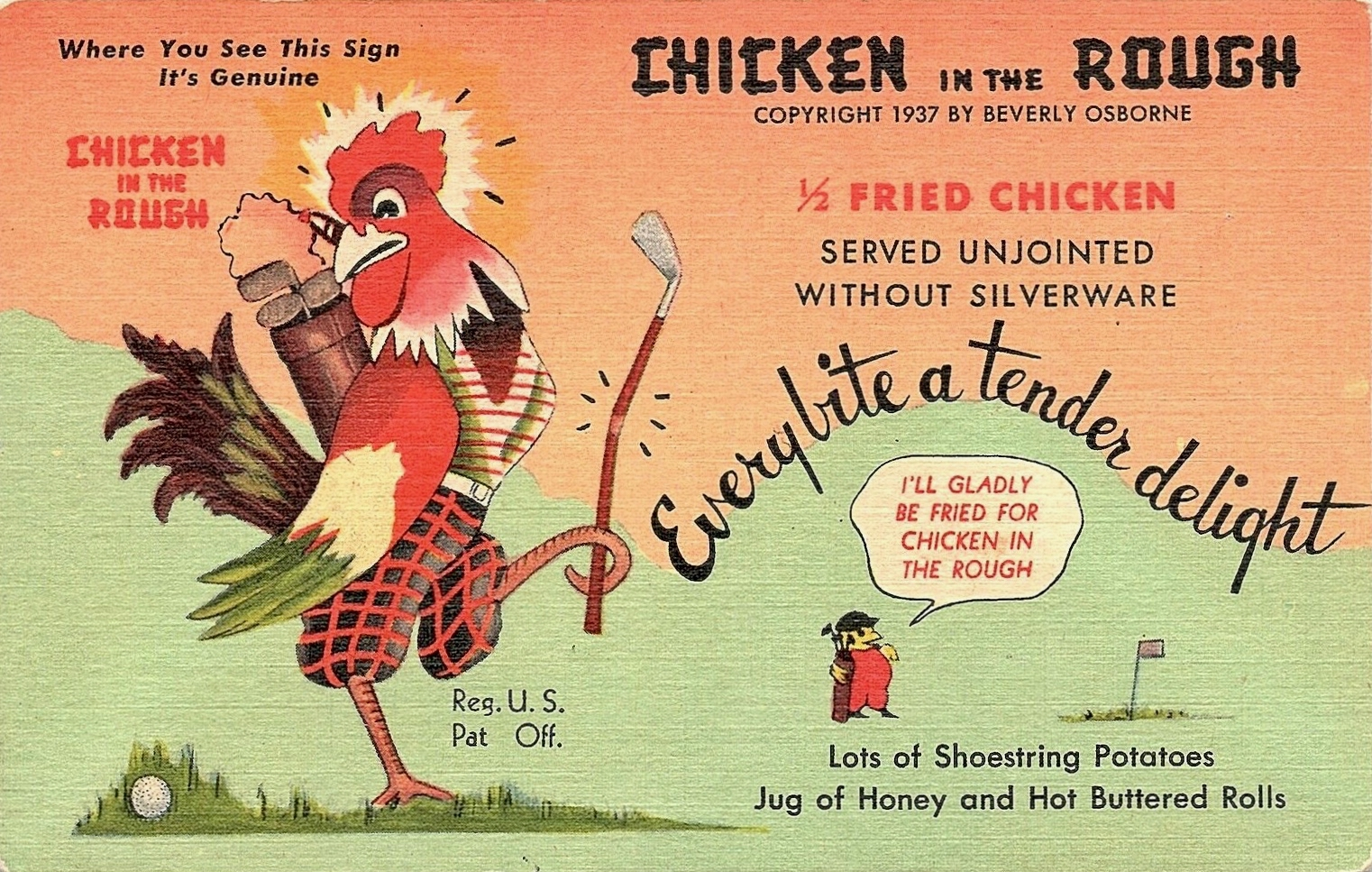
- A 1937 postcard with the Chicken in the Rough and "Chicken's Caddie" logos
- Type: Restaurant chain and former franchise
- Industry: Fast casual restaurant
- Founded: 1936; 90 years ago
- Founders: Beverly and Rubye Osborne
- Products: Fried chicken, shoestring potatoes, biscuits and honey
- Website: chickenintherough.com

Chicken in the Rough, also known as Beverly's Chicken in the Rough, is a fried chicken restaurant chain and former franchise. It was one of the earliest restaurant chain franchises in the United States. Chicken in the Rough was founded by Beverly and Rubye Osborne in 1936 in Oklahoma City.

The restaurant's specialty, half a fried chicken dish, was also created in 1936. The dish was also referred to as "Chicken in the Rough", and consisted of half a fried chicken, shoestring potatoes and a biscuit with honey.

As of 2021 three restaurants serve the dish in Sarnia, Ontario.

The chain's logo was an image of a rooster smoking a cigar and carrying a golf club. The chain also used a logo of "Chicken's Caddie", which depicted a chick acting as a golf caddie, stating "I'll gladly be fried for Chicken in the Rough".

== History ==
The restaurant's name was devised on a cancelled 1936 road trip to California, in which Beverly spilled a picnic basket of chicken after Rubye hit a bump in the road while driving on the Oklahoma prairie. Rubye remarked something to the effect of "This is really chicken in the rough". After this occurred, they turned around and headed back to Oklahoma City. The official website of the chain states that this is the correct version. Another notion is that the name was devised on a family picnic "where silverware had been forgotten", and that the consumption of the chicken without silverware constituted eating it "in the rough", using one's hands.

== Beverly's Pancake Corner aka Beverly's Pancake Corner - "home base" of Chicken in the Rough ==
In 1936, the first standalone Chicken in the Rough restaurant was opened on U.S. Route 66 at 2429 North Lincoln, Oklahoma City, and was initially a small drive-in restaurant with nine stools and four booths. The restaurant was significantly expanded to seat 1,100 people, and became a place that was visited by travelers, film stars and state executives. Celebrities who were friends with the Osbornes and patrons of Beverly's Pancake Corner restaurants include Bob Hope and Gene Autry.

Beverly's Pancake House had a framed black-and-white photo on a wall showing Hope with a birthday cake that the restaurant made him one year. In 1961, the building was demolished, and the state capitol complex was constructed there.

Beverly's Pancake Corner in Oklahoma City, Oklahoma, later called Beverly's Pancake House, has been described as the "home base" of Chicken in the Rough. The half-chicken dish continued to be served at Beverly's Pancake House, where it's prepared according to its original recipe.

People who have patronized Beverly's Pancake Corner since their youth, some of whom remember the first day it opened, continue to eat at the restaurant. In 2008, when the Beverly's Pancake Corner location at Northwest Expressway and Pennsylvania in Oklahoma City was razed, where it had existed since 1956, people took pieces of concrete and bricks from the building as mementos.

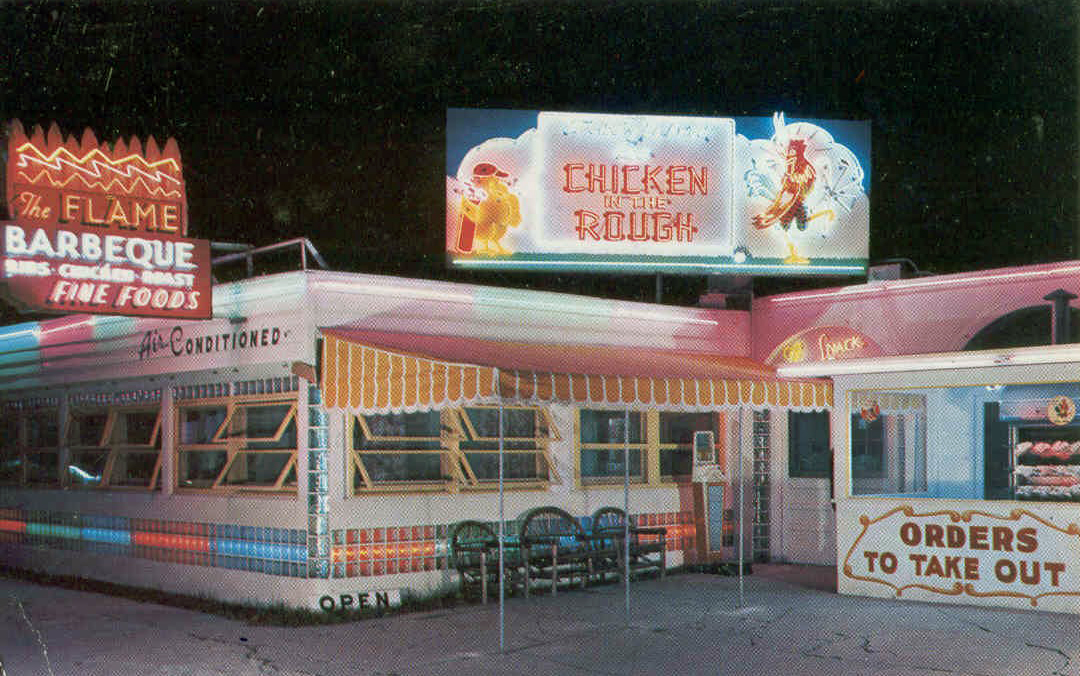
Key West, Florida, 1956

== Expansion ==
Chicken in the Rough was the first nationally franchised restaurant chain in the United States. In 1937, the chain had locations on Route 66 in the U.S. states of Arizona, Oklahoma, Missouri and Illinois. In 1949, an extraordinary grill was designed that simultaneously fried and steamed chicken, after which time franchising began.

During its heyday, the chain had seven locations in Oklahoma City and nearly 300 franchise locations, including franchises in South Africa and Hawaii. In the 1960s, after the franchise was sold to an investor group, 68 franchises remained. In 1974 Osborne's partner, Randy Shaw, purchased the restaurant chain.

== 2010s ==
As of July 2015, three restaurants continued to serve the dish: in Sarnia, Ontario, Canada, Port Huron, Michigan, and New Market, Virginia. The dish was prepared with a unique breading and preparation method, and cooked in a deep fryer.

== See also ==
- List of chicken restaurants
- List of restaurant chains in the United States
