= Cluck-U Chicken =

American fast food chain

- Type: Private
- Industry: Restaurants
- Genre: Fast food
- Founded: 1985; 41 years ago
- Founder: Robert Ilvento
- Headquarters: College Park, Maryland, United States
- Number of locations: 10
- Area served: United States
- Products: Chicken, hot wings, french fries, hot sandwiches
- Website: www.cluckuchicken.com

Cluck-U Chicken, also known as Cluck University, is an American quick-serve restaurant chain, with locations in the U.S. states of Maryland, New Jersey, and Pennsylvania.

While most locations are franchises, Cluck-U also operates corporate-owned stores, featuring a more limited menu, under the name Cluckster's.

== History ==
Cluck-U Chicken was started by Robert Ilvento in 1985. The first location was in New Brunswick, New Jersey at Rutgers University. Ilvento sold the business in 1999.

In 2000, JP Haddad acquired the rights to develop the franchise nationally, while Ilvento began to promote the business.

== Products ==
Cluck-U Chicken (a.k.a. "Cluck") serves chicken wings ("wingers") with a variety of traditional sauces including Honey-Hickory and spicy sauces on the scale Mild, Atomic, Nuclear, Thermo-Nuclear, 911 and Nuclear Fusion. At some locations where the "911" sauce is served, customers must sign a liability waiver. Other food products include chicken sandwiches, salads, appetizers, chicken fingers, fries, rice bowls, fish sandwiches and the like.

== See also ==
- List of fast-food chicken restaurants
