= SCR (restaurant) =

Malaysian fast food restaurant chain

SCR Corporation Sdn Bhd
- Type: Private Limited Company
- Industry: Fast food restaurant
- Founded: 1987; 39 years ago in Song Thian Cheok Road, Kuching, Sarawak, Malaysia
- Founder: Johnson Tan
- Headquarters: Rock Road, Kuching, Malaysia
- Area served: Asia
- Key people: Michael Sim; Johnny Leo
- Products: Chicken rice
- Revenue: MYR1.5 billion (2012)
- Website: www.scr.my

SCR Corporation Sdn Bhd (doing business as SCR) is a Malaysian halal-certified chicken rice fast-food restaurant chain in Sarawak. The chain is operated by SCR Corporation Sdn Bhd which was established in 1987. Since its birth, SCR Corporation Sdn Bhd has grown to become one of East Malaysia's biggest home grown food names with international outlets in Brunei and Indonesia.

== History ==
Originally named as Singapore Chicken Rice, it has rebranded itself into SCR and with introduction of SCR Xpress, which was introduced in early 2007 as another restaurant chains with a distinct blend of the old and new menu. The company formed as a result of Singapore-Sarawak joint venture, with the Singaporean partner bringing in the recipes for the chicken rice. Its operations started out with only 1,200 sq. feet air-conditioned lot in Song Thian Cheok Road. Over the years, the company now boasts a total of 30 outlets to date. SCR is set to expand it branches regionally through franchising efforts.

== Locations ==
There are a total of 30 outlets throughout Sarawak. Among the main locations are in Kuching, Sibu and Miri. It has also open pioneer branches in Bintulu, Limbang, and Sarikei. While in Sabah, it is available in Kota Kinabalu while the others will be opened in Sandakan, Kota Marudu and Keningau.

=== International presence of SCR chains ===
The company currently planning to open 100 outlets in Southeast Asia and East Asia countries.

Asia

- Malaysia (1987)
- Brunei (2013)
- Indonesia (2015)

== See also ==
- List of fast-food chicken restaurants
