= Martin's BBQ =

Puerto Rican cuisine fast food restaurant chain

- Type: Private
- Industry: Fast Food
- Founded: 1962; 64 years ago Bayamon, Puerto Rico
- Areas served: Puerto Rico; Central Florida
- Key people: Héctor Raúl Rosado Velázquez
- Website: (English)

Martin's BBQ is a Puerto Rican cuisine fast food restaurant chain that has 26 locations in Puerto Rico, where it is a "household name" and is one of the larger chains, along with two locations in Florida, in Orlando and in Tampa. The store's logo features a tough-looking chicken wearing a toque and the motto "¡El Original!" (The Original!).

== See also ==
- List of fast-food chicken restaurants
