= Rostipollos =

Restaurant chain in Costa Rica and Nicaragua

RostiPollos is a Central American cuisine restaurant franchise founded in Costa Rica by Nicaraguan businessman Mauricio Mendieta.

== About ==
The first restaurant was opened in the wealthy Escazú district of San José, Costa Rica in 1983 by the husband-and-wife team of Mauricio Mendieta Herdocia and Ivania Espinosa. As Mauricio Mendieta is Nicaraguan, the restaurant claims to be the first Nicaraguan restaurant to have franchises.

== Location ==
It now has locations in Costa Rica and Nicaragua.

== See also ==
- List of chicken restaurants
