= Foosackly's =

American chain of chicken restaurants

- Type: Private
- Industry: Restaurants
- Genre: Fast food
- Founded: 2000; 26 years ago
- Founder: Will Fusaiotti; Eric Brechtel
- Headquarters: Mobile, Alabama, U.S.
- Number of locations: 15
- Area served: Alabama, Florida
- Products: Chicken fingers, french fries, Texas toast, salads, sandwiches
- Revenue: ▲US$53.1 million (2021)
- Number of employees: About 200 (2021)
- Website: foosacklys.net

Foosackly's (stylized as foosackly's) is an American chain of chicken restaurants in coastal Alabama and Northwest Florida.

== Background ==
Foosackly's was co-founded by Will Fusaiotti and Eric Brechtel. The two attended Louisiana State University together. Fusaiotti moved to Mobile with his family in 1995 to help his father open a Smoothie King. Fusaiotti and Brechtel had never fried a piece of chicken until the weekend before opening their first location on University Boulevard in Mobile in 2000. The first location opened on April 28, 2000.

The restaurant has grown into a mini-chain in Alabama with 14 current operating locations in Mobile, Spanish Fort, Daphne, Foley, Saraland, Semmes, Auburn, and two in Pensacola, Florida. The chain opened its fourteenth location, in Tuscaloosa, in 2020, and has plans to open further locations in Baldwin County and in Pensacola. Fusaiotti has also considered opening restaurants in downtown Mobile and locations northward toward Montgomery and Birmingham, describing his philosophy of "It's not how many you open, it's how many you keep open."

All restaurants had to shut down their in-room dine-ins in mid-March 2020 to combat the COVID-19 pandemic. Customers could still make their orders via drive-thru, take-away or pick-up service. Dine-in service has since resumed.

== Advertising ==
One of the company's advertising campaigns gained national and international attention in 2008 during the U.S. Air Force's KC-135 aerial refueling tanker dispute between Boeing and a Northrop Grumman/EADS partnership. Boeing protested the contract being awarded to Northrop Grumman/EADS, who would have built the tankers in Mobile. After this protest, Foosackly's placed billboards around the area stating "We would like to offer Boeing a finger." That advertising campaign saw bumper stickers featuring the slogan sold as far afield as California and France. Almost four years later, following an announcement in July 2012 from Airbus (a subsidiary of EADS) that it planned to build its first North American aircraft assembly plant in Mobile, Foosackly's began using a new slogan that read "We'd like to offer Airbus a hand."

== Credit card breach of 2018 ==
In mid-2018, the company reported that all of its locations had been hacked and credit card data from over 165,000+ customers had been compromised. The attack took place from March 2018 through August 2018.

== See also ==
- List of fast-food chicken restaurants
- Guthrie's
- Raising Cane's Chicken Fingers
- Zaxby's
