= Louisiana Famous Fried Chicken =

American fast food chain

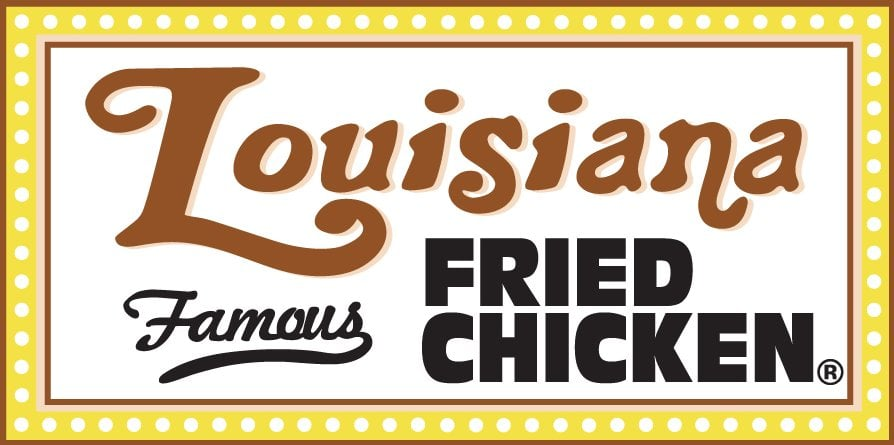
- Industry: Restaurants
- Genre: Fast food
- Founded: 1976; 50 years ago
- Headquarters: Los Angeles, U.S.
- Number of locations: 148 (2017)
- Key people: Joe Dion, Michael P. Eng
- Website: louisianafriedchickenhq.com

Louisiana Famous Fried Chicken is an American fast food chain that started in 1976 in Los Angeles by Joe Dion, a Michigan native.

The company is a franchise venture where licensees pay for license rights and a flour and red pepper recipe used to coat the dishes but are otherwise not restricted. Apart from Los Angeles, there are also locations in Pasadena as well as other locations in California; there are also stores in Arizona, Georgia, Illinois, Michigan, North Carolina and Texas.

== History ==
The first Louisiana Famous Fried Chicken was started by Joseph Dion who experimented with a recipe he says he obtained from a New Orleans Chef Paul Prudhomme. Dion started the franchise in 1976 on a corner lot of Vermont Avenue and Imperial Highway in California.

By 2017, there were 148 Louisiana Famous Fried Chicken restaurants in the United States, mostly run by Cambodians. Further, ownership of the company had been transferred to Michael P. Eng.

== See also ==
- List of fast-food chicken restaurants
- List of fast food restaurant chains
