= White Fence Farm =

- Interactive map of White Fence Farm

Restaurant information
- Established: Early 1920s
- Food type: Chicken
- Location: Romeoville, Illinois, United States
- Coordinates: 41°40′26″N 88°03′27″W
- Website: whitefencefarm-il.com

White Fence Farm is the name of a restaurant chain with locations in the Chicago metropolitan area. The original location is in Romeoville, Illinois.

== Early history ==
The original White Fence Farm location is in Romeoville, where it was established in the early 1920s on US Route 66. It was founded by Stuyvesant 'Jack' Peabody, son of Peabody Coal Company founder Francis S. Peabody and himself CEO of Peabody Coal at the time. It was opened on a 12-acre plot that Jack Peabody owned across U.S. Route 66/Joliet Road from his 450-acre Lemont horse farm, where thoroughbred racehorses were bred, boarded and trained. The story was that Jack Peabody often had weekend guests at his horse farm, but there was no restaurant in the area where he could entertain them – so he started one himself. The roadside restaurant, which opened in a converted farmhouse, was known then for its hamburger sandwiches and Guernsey milk products, including ice cream.

By the time U.S. Route 66 opened in November 1926, White Fence Farm had already served several thousand customers. It was reviewed several times during the Peabody years by the early restaurant critic Duncan Hines, who had been a fan of the restaurant since the late 1920s. After Prohibition ended, Jack Peabody promoted California wines at the restaurant and helped to revive the California wine industry, as he had earlier helped to revive thoroughbred horse racing in Illinois during the 1910s and 1920s. Peabody operated the restaurant successfully until his death in 1946. After that, the restaurant was first leased to several different renters, then eventually sold by Jack's son, Stuyvesant Peabody Jr.

== Change in ownership ==
Since 1954, the restaurant has been owned and operated by the Hastert family. Robert Hastert Sr. was the first family owner-manager. Hastert had begun as a wholesale poultry dealer at the Aurora Poultry Market during World War II and later owned the Harmony House restaurant in Aurora, Illinois, which he had opened four years before he bought White Fence Farm. The property had gone through several operators and/or owners after being sold by the Peabody estate. Family legend has it that Bob Hastert Sr. settled on the purchase price for the restaurant property with the previous owner, an acquaintance who had gone bankrupt, by using the flip of a coin.

Hastert was uncle to and his son, Bob Hastert Jr., was the first cousin of, former Speaker of the House Rep. J. Dennis Hastert (R-IL). Bob Jr., who had converted an industrial-sized hospital autoclave into an outsized pressure cooker for the restaurant's unique method of cooking the chicken, took over the operation of the restaurant after his father's death in 1998. Bob Sr.'s wife, Doris, also worked at the restaurant, usually as a hostess. Laura Hastert, daughter of Robert Jr., is the restaurant's current owner and manager. The restaurant's famous fried chicken recipe was added to the menu during the 1950s by Bob Hastert Sr. who, by his granddaughter's admission, told the chicken recipe origin story several different ways at different times and may have just as easily borrowed the recipe from someone else as brought it with him from Harmony House.

The restaurant building was expanded several times under the Hasterts. It now has several dining rooms, with seating for more than 1,000 customers. It also features a side room and gallery that includes an antique car collection, other antiques, and Jack Peabody's collection of original Currier & Ives prints, among other nostalgic displays. During the summer, the restaurant has an outdoor petting zoo.

== Competition ==
White Fence Farm markets its dish as "the world's greatest fried chicken," which is pressure cooked and refrigerated in bulk before being flash-fried to order. The restaurant maintains a long-standing rivalry with nearby Dell Rhea's Chicken Basket on Route 66 in Illinois, with both establishments noted for their fried chicken and corn fritters. While Dell Rhea's Chicken Basket began serving fried chicken earlier, White Fence Farm distinguishes its menu by offering a brandy ice dessert.

== Other locations ==
White Fence Farm operates several satellite carry-out locations throughout southwest suburban Chicago, an enterprise that was begun by Bob Hastert Jr.

== See also ==
- List of chicken restaurants
