= Ma Yu Ching =

Historic restaurant in Kaifeng, Henan, China

Ma Yu Ching's Bucket Chicken House, or Ma Yuxing, (Chinese: 马豫兴桶子鸡; pinyin: Mǎ Yùxīng Tǒngzi Jī), is a historic restaurant in Kaifeng, Henan, China, said to be originally established in 1153, during the Jin dynasty (1115–1234).

The Ma family began trading in bucket chicken in Nanjing, in today's Jiangsu Province, after the Song dynasty moved to the south.

In 1855, Ma Youren, a descendant of the original Mr Ma moved back to his ancestral home in the village of Laodong, Kaifeng, bringing with him a bucket of the traditional sauce. There, Ma Youren established the "Ma Yuxing Roast Chicken Shop" in 1864, specialising in bucket chicken. In 1954, a branch store was established in Zhengzhou when that city became the capital of Henan province.

In February 2007, Ma Yu Ching's bucket chicken was named as an intangible cultural heritage of Henan Province.

== See also ==
- List of chicken restaurants
- List of Chinese restaurants
- List of oldest companies
