= Gus's World Famous Fried Chicken =

Restaurant in Memphis, Tennessee, United States

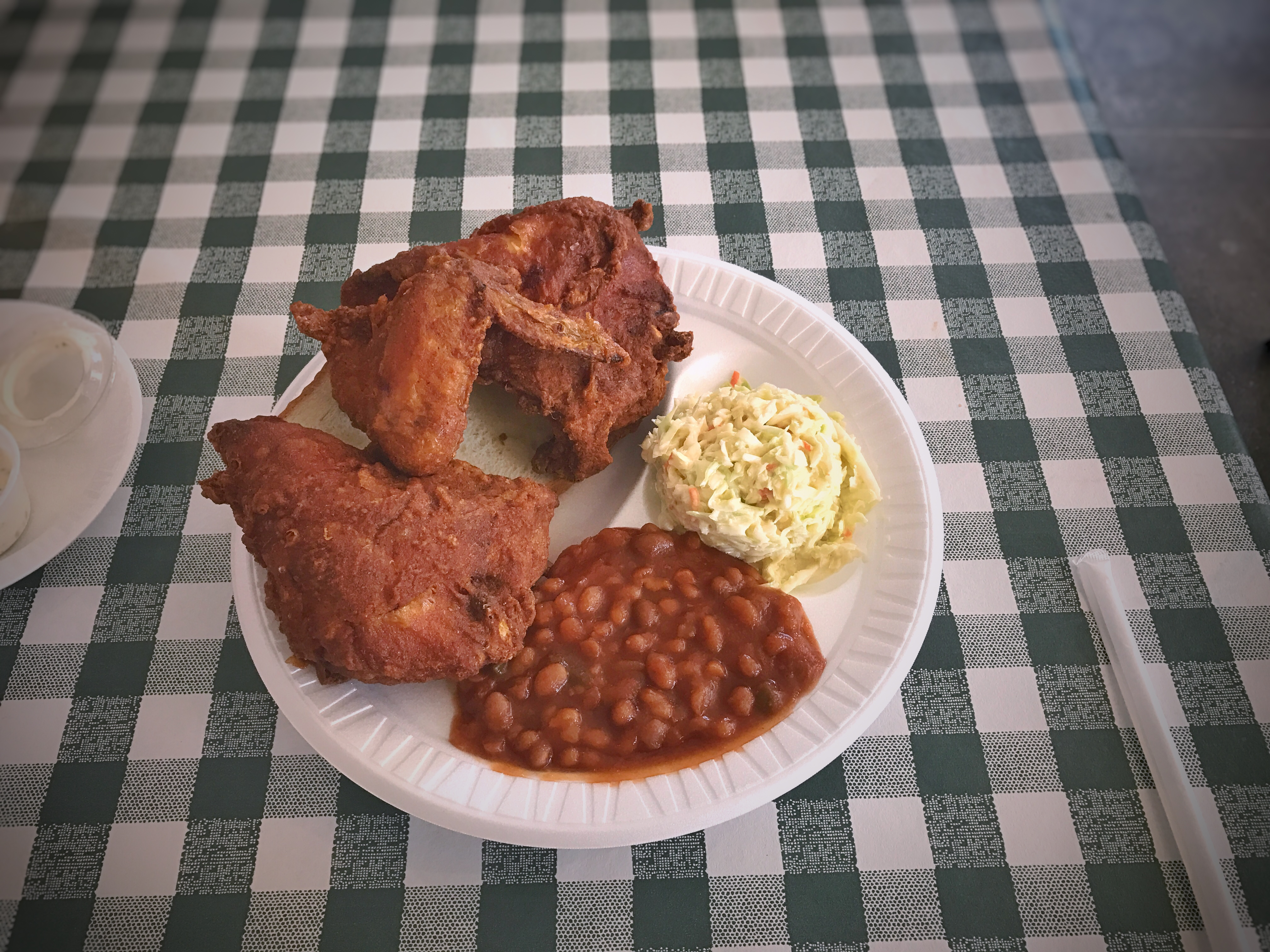
Three-piece fried chicken, baked beans, and slaw served at Gus's

Gus's World Famous Fried Chicken is a chain of southern fried chicken restaurants based in the independent Town of Mason, Tennessee, United States. It was also founded in the town of Mason, Tennessee by Napoleon Vanderbilt. As of March 2026, there are 40 locations in 14 states across the United States, there are plans to start franchising locations in China.

The business is known for the hearse out front advertising "chicken worth dying for." Travel Channel rated Gus's as the 12th tastiest place to chow down and GQ Magazine rated it as a "top ten restaurant in the world worth flying for." It has been featured on food channel television shows including The Best Thing I Ever Ate, $40 a Day with Rachael Ray and Man v. Food. A red rooster frequented the business.

Although the "S apostrophe S" signifying possession may appear to be grammatically incorrect, it is supported by the 17th edition of the Chicago Manual of Style.

== See also ==
- List of chicken restaurants
