= Siipiweikot =

Finnish restaurant chain

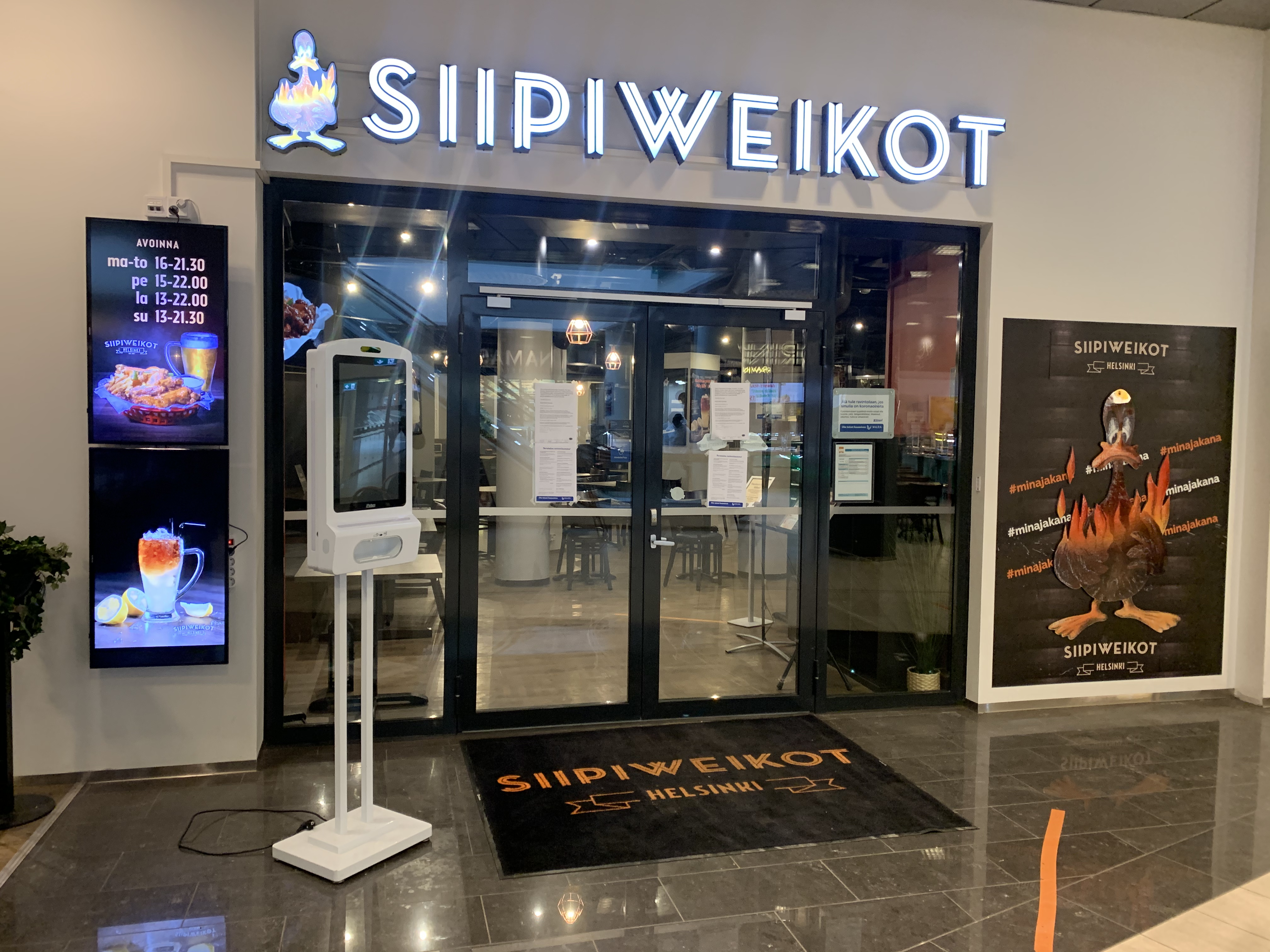
- The entrance to the former Siipiweikot restaurant in Helsinki.
- Trade name: Hot Wings Oy
- Industry: Restaurant chain
- Founded: 1993; 33 years ago
- Founder: Pekka Yli-Houhala
- Headquarters: Tampere, Finland
- Number of locations: 2
- Key people: Laura Yli-Houhala (CEO)
- Products: Chicken wings
- Revenue: EUR 4,800,000 (2020)
- Operating income: EUR 472,000
- Website: www.siipiweikot.fi

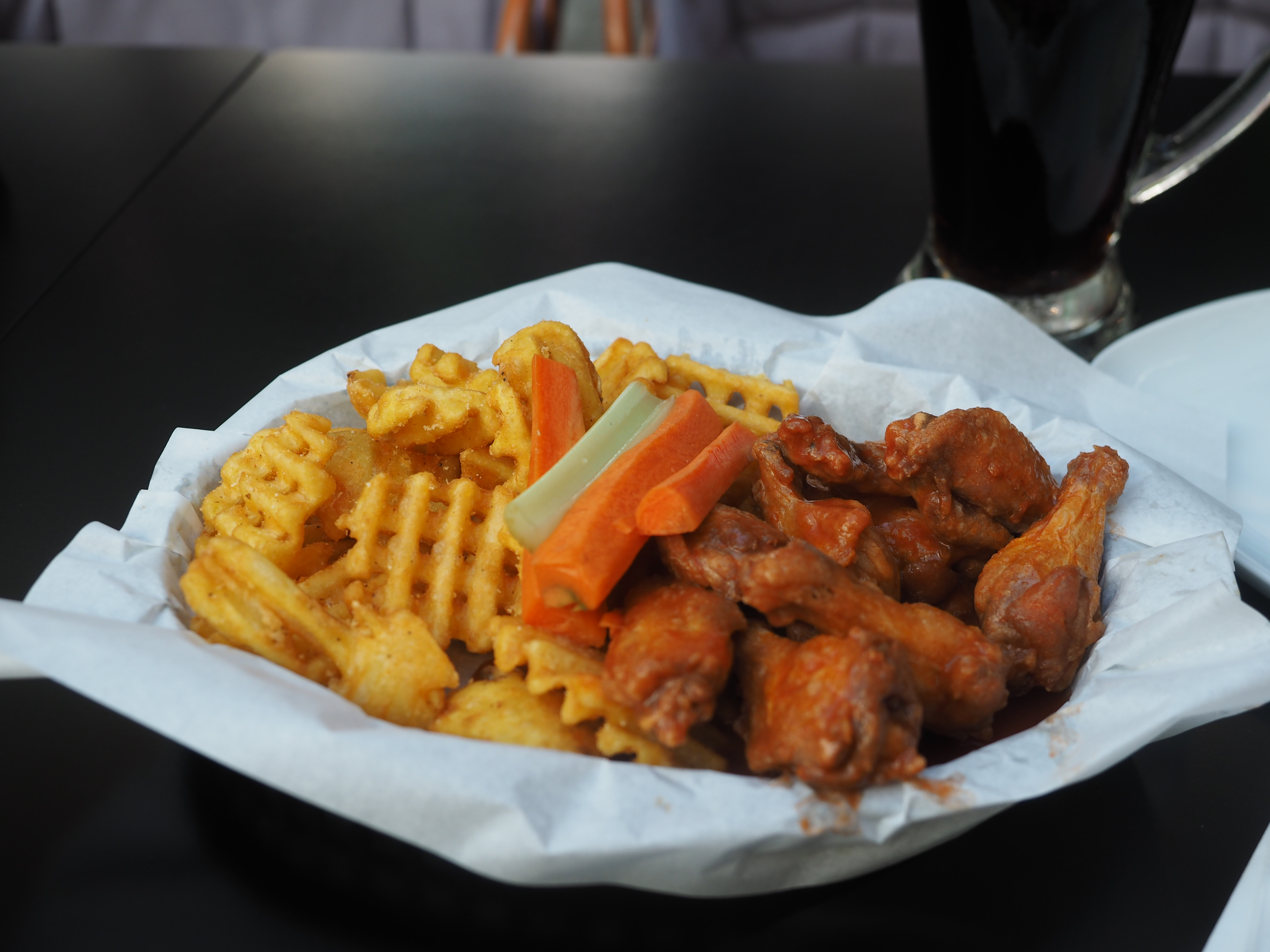
Chicken wings at the Siipiweikot restaurant in Espoo.

Siipiweikot is a Finnish restaurant chain founded in 1993 specialising in hot chicken wings, spicy sauces, french fries and beer. The Siipiweikot chain has two restaurants in Tampere. Also the Prisma store in Pirkkala has a smaller bar-style establishment where wings can be bought as take-away.

Siipiweikot has become famous for furthering the hot wings culture in Finland, and its home city of Tampere has often been called "the wings capital of Finland". The restaurant menu also offers vegetarian options based on seitan. The Siipiweikot sauces are also sold for consumers in grocery stores.

The business of the restaurant chain is handled by the limited company Hot Wings Oy. In 2020 the company's revenue was 4.8 million euro, and the annual profit was 472 thousand euro. The current CEO of the company is Laura Yli-Houhala, who is the daughter of the company founder Pekka Yli-Houhala.
