= Rostic's =

Russian fast food restaurant chain

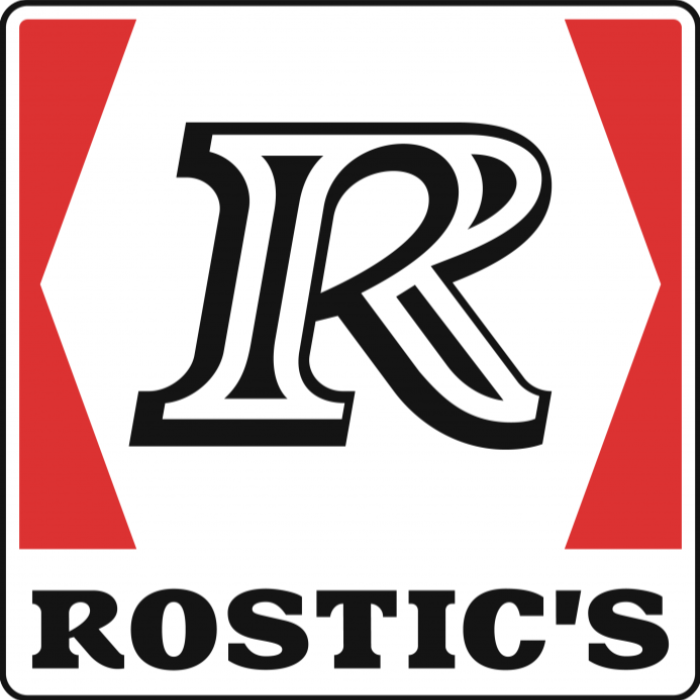

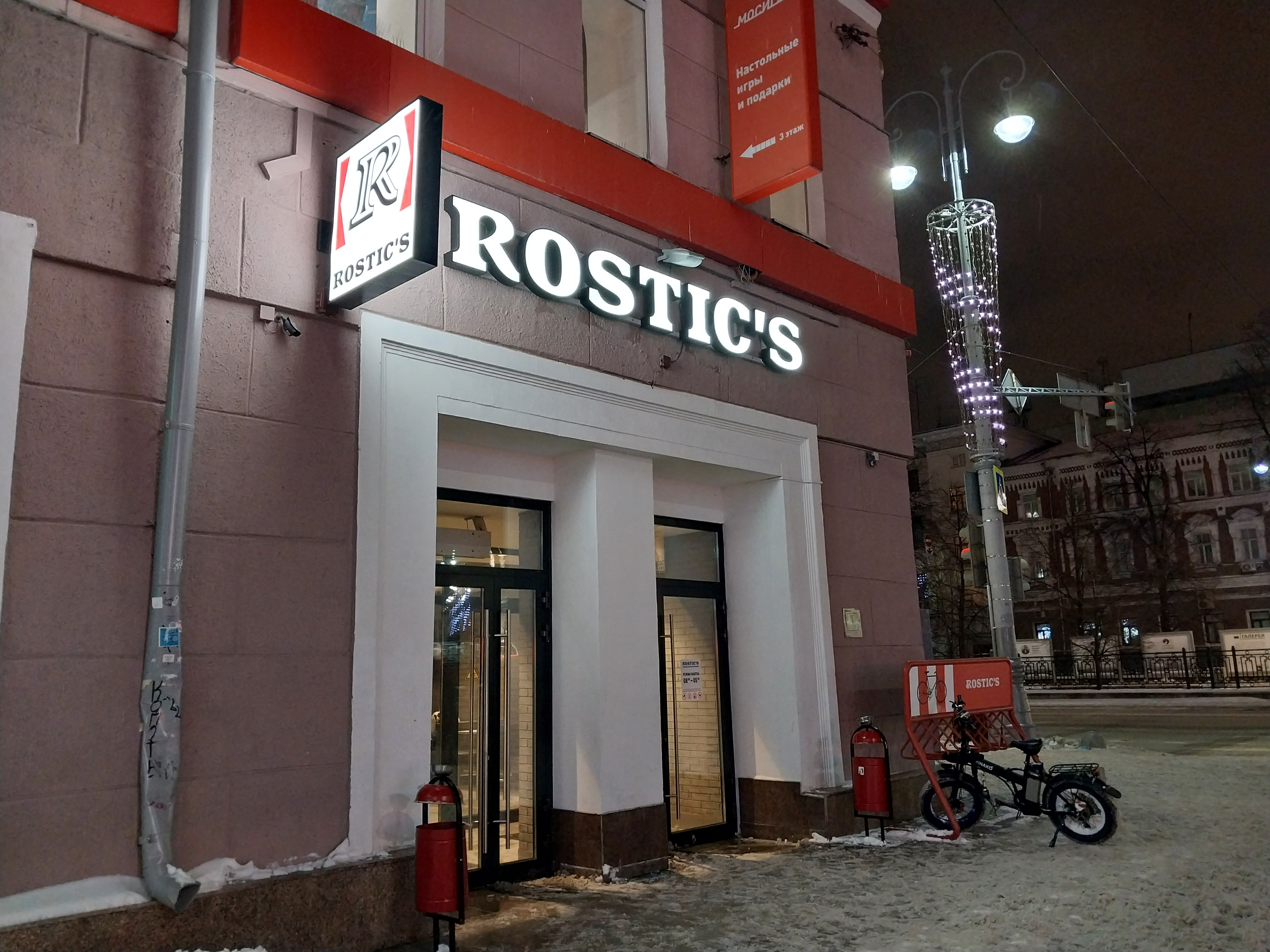
- Rostic's restaurant on Vayner Street in Yekaterinburg (2023)
- Native name: Ростикс
- Type: Private
- Founded: 1993; 33 years ago

Rostic's is a Russian fast-food chain specializing in chicken recipe. The chain was founded by businessman Rostislav Vadimovich Ordovskiy-Tanayevskiy Blanko, with the first store opening in 1993 in Moscow. In 2005, the chain signed a strategic partnership agreement with Yum! Brands, the American corporation that owns the KFC brand. The restaurants were renamed Rostic's — KFC, and then, in 2012, officially adopted the KFC brand name. In 2023, after Yum! Brands withdrew from the Russian market, the management rights of the chain were sold to Smart Service LTD. Under the terms of the agreement, all KFC establishments in Russia had to revert to the name Rostic's. The brand repositioning process was completed in early 2026.

Rostic's owns 68 restaurants directly managed by the company and more than 1,000 locations operated by 20 franchise partners, making it the largest fast-food chain in Russia in terms of the number of outlets. In terms of market share, the chain ranks second, after Dodo Pizza and Vkusno i tochka. The chain's menu remains largely unchanged from previous KFC offerings, featuring over 200 items, including a wide variety of sandwiches, side dishes, desserts, and beverages.

== History ==
Rostic's is owned by a Venezuelan-Russian businessman Rostislav Vadimovich Ordovskiy-Tanayevskiy Blanko founded. The first restaurant opened in Moscow in 1993. This brand became the first large-scale fast-food chain in Russia, successfully competing with McDonald's. The chain is part of the diversified Rostik Group, which has been operating since 1990.. Rostic's operated on a similar model to the American KFC chain, which was also operating in the Russian market from 1993 to 1998 but withdrew due to the influence of 1998 Russian financial crisis. Both restaurants also have fried chicken dishes with quite similar styles.

In the mid-1990s, Rostic's expanded its restaurant system to many cities across Russia, including the Siberian region: Omsk (1996) and Novosibirsk (1998).

In the early 2000s, the media began paying more attention to the use of various food colorings, chemical additives, and genetically modified organisms by foreign companies. The image associated with the West and adherence to global restaurant business standards negatively impacted the company's reputation. As a result, from 2001 onwards, the menu began to feature more Russian flavors, advertising campaigns emphasized the brand's Russian origins, and the interior design incorporated ethnic motifs..

As of 2004, Rostic's was the largest restaurant chain in the group and the leader in the number of locations in the domestic fast-food market. It had 42 branches operating in Moscow, and another 12 in major Russian cities and neighboring countries. Half of its 54 restaurants operated under a franchise model. The menu included over 70 different dishes..

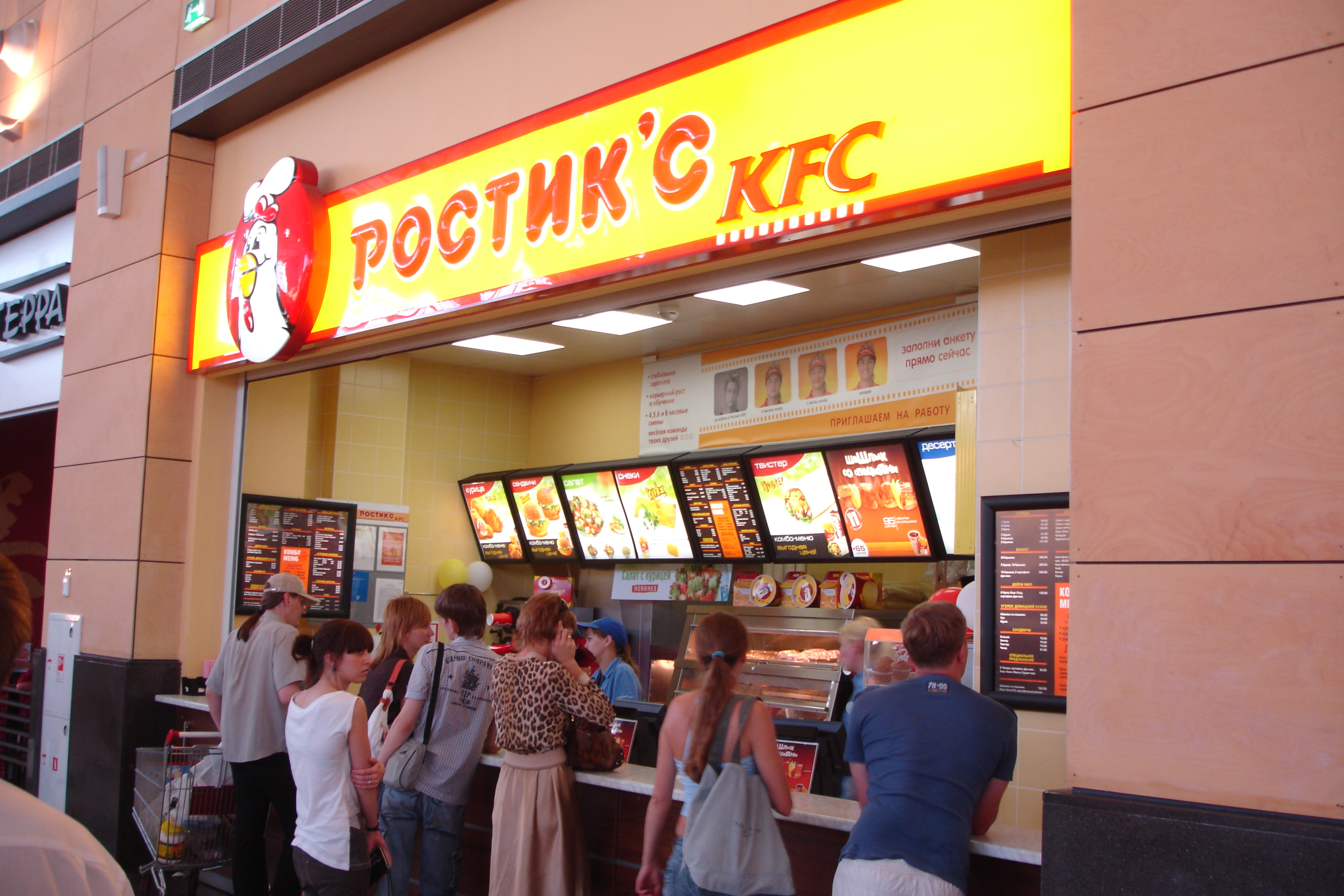
Rostic's — at Mega shopping mall from Novosibirsk (2008)

In 2005, the American corporation Yum! Brands, owner of KFC, signed a strategic partnership agreement with Rostik Group to jointly develop the chain under the common name Rostik's — KFC.. At that time, the company owned 80 restaurants in Russia, Belarus, and Ukraine.. The following year, Yum! Brands acquired the rights to the Rostic's brand and related intellectual property for $15 million.. The agreement also stipulates that after five to seven years, the American partner may acquire the entire chain.. The first coffee shop, named Rostic's — KFC, opened in April 2006., after all the establishments simultaneously changed their names..

In 2010, Yum! Brands announced it would acquire the Russian restaurant chain, which at the time comprised 161 locations.. The deal was finalized in 2011, and by the end of 2012, all the restaurants had been renamed KFC..

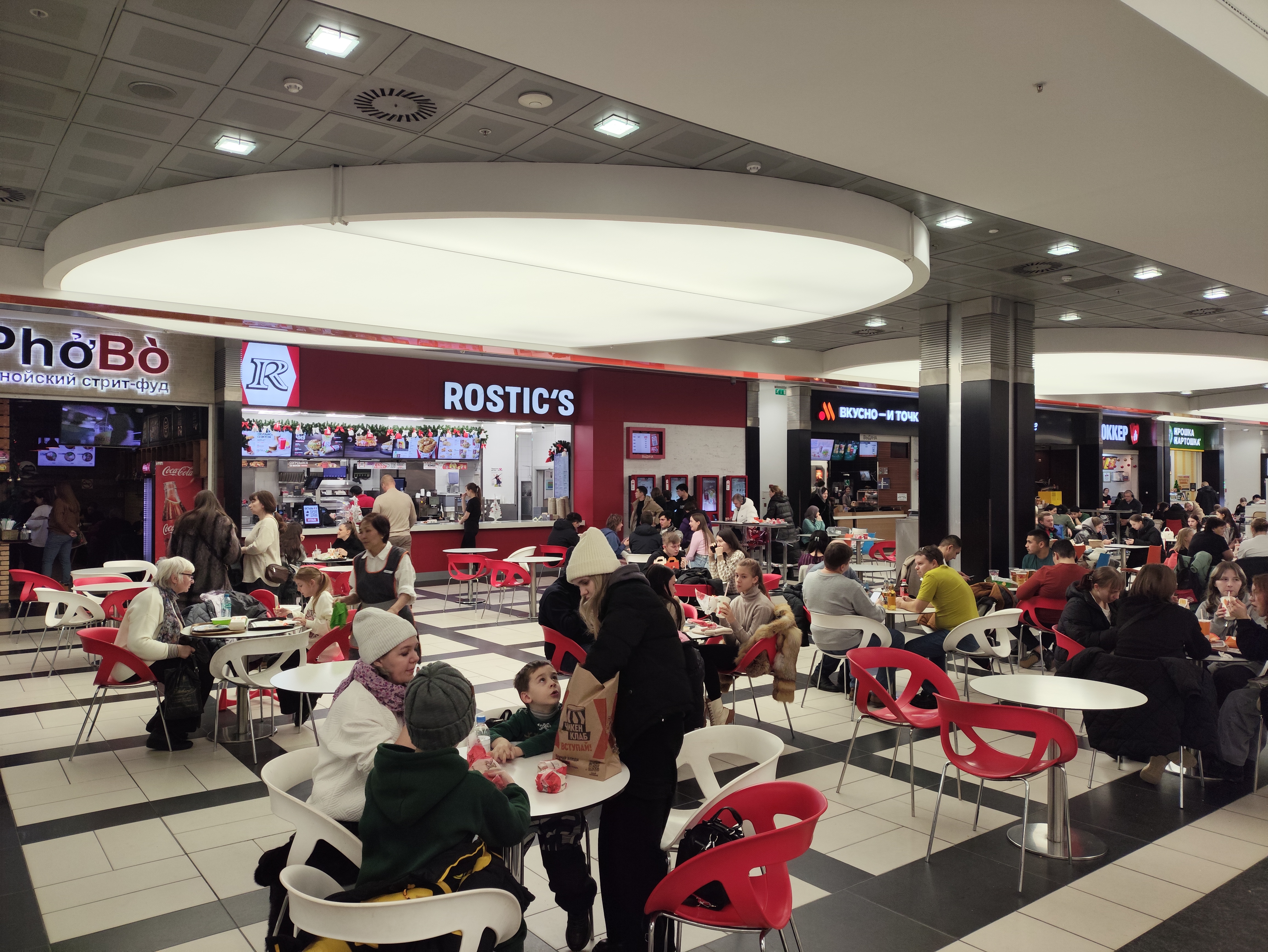
Rostic's restaurant inside the Kapitoliy shopping center in Moscow (2025)

As of 2022, there were approximately 1,100 KFC establishments operating in Russia. Of these, only 66 restaurants were owned by Yum! Brands, with the rest being franchised outlets. The corporation developed its own stores through its subsidiary Yum! Restaurants Russia. In March 2022, following Russia's invasion of Ukraine, Yum! Brands suspended operations of its owned restaurants in Russia, and ceased investment and business development in the country. By April 2023, the entire KFC business in the Russian Federation was acquired by Smart Service LTD. This company is owned by Konstantin Kotov and Andrey Oskolkov, who had previously developed approximately 40 KFC franchise restaurants in several regions. Smart Service acquired Yum! Restaurants Russia (which had changed its name to Unirest before the sale). Based on the terms of the agreement, all restaurants (including franchised establishments) were required to undergo a name change. As a result, Smart Service decided to revive the Rostic's name.

On April 25, 2023, KFC's flagship restaurant located next to the Mayakovskaya metro station in Moscow became the first establishment to rebrand as Rostic's. At the time, the company announced that by the end of summer, approximately 100 establishments would have switched to the new brand, and by the end of the year, this number would reach about 10% of its total restaurants.. Simultaneously, the consolidation of existing KFC-branded establishments was underway. In February 2023, Smart Service acquired the business of AmRest, which operated 215 KFC restaurants under a franchise agreement. By August 2023, Smart Service, together with International Restaurant Brands, the largest KFC franchise partner in Russia, established the joint venture company Restorany bystrogo pitaniya LLC to develop the Rostic's brand. However, some franchisees refused to change their signage, as their contracts stipulated the right to use the KFC brand until the end of 2035.. April 2024, 90% of the chain's franchise partners had signed a name change agreement. At that time, 750 restaurants had officially switched to the Rostic's brand.. In December 2024, Unirest acquired AK Russia, which continues to operate 97 restaurants under the KFC brand. These establishments are scheduled to be renamed before spring 2025, after which the KFC rebranding process in Russia will be nearly complete..

The owners expressed their desire to expand the brand's reach in Russia between now and 2029, and also plan to launch innovative street store models..

In 2025, the shareholder structure of this fast-food chain will change when 12.75% of the shares are transferred from Marathon to Island For Business (IFB) of Oman. As of July 2025, the owners of the chain include:

- Invest (23,4%);
- Horizon Capital (26,5%);
- Forum-Invest (24,49%);
- Island For Business (12,75%);
- Gradient Capital (11,75%).

== Business information ==
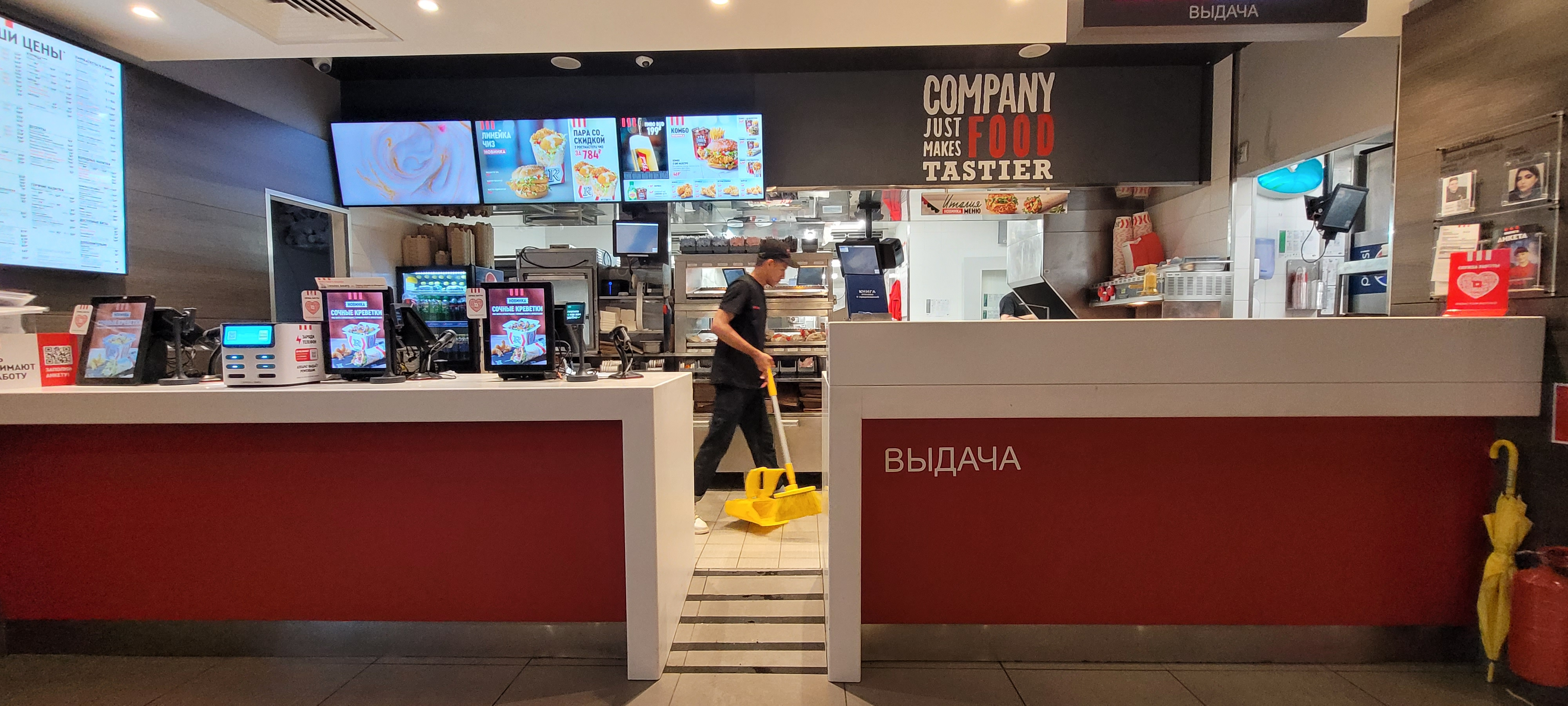
Inside Rostic's restaurant on Tolmacheva Street in Yekaterinburg (2024)

At the end of 2023, Unirest recorded a 17.1% increase in revenue, reaching 20.17 billion rubles. Gross profit reached 14.96 billion rubles, a 34.7% increase. Trading expenses increased by 9.7% to 7.1 billion rubles. Net profit increased 2.75 times, reaching 3.54 billion rubles.. As of the end of 2024, Rostic's owned 68 restaurants directly managed by the company and partnered with 20 franchisees to operate over 1,000 restaurants. The chain held the largest position in the Russian fast-food market in terms of the number of outlets and ranked second in market share. Main competitors included Vkusno i tochka, Burger King, and Dodo Pizza. Each day, the chain served over 1,700,000 customers..

== Menu ==
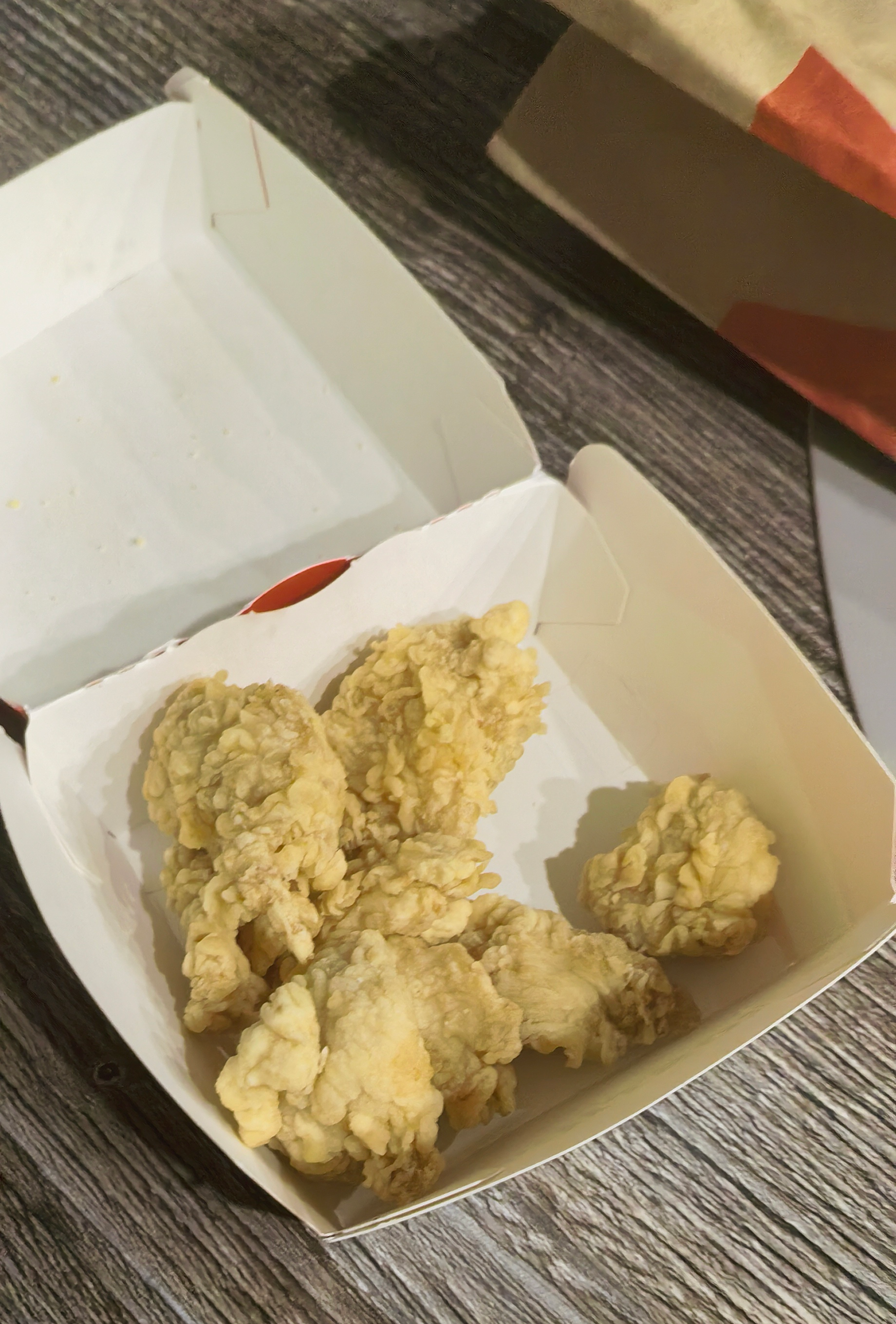
Bites nugget

As of the end of 2024, the menu featured over 200 items, including more than 20 types of sandwiches, 10 )chicken varieties, beverages, desserts, side dishes, mozzarella sticks, and shrimp. In 2023, many observers noted that the brand's menu fully retained the items previously offered by KFC. The company only had to rename two items that were proprietary trademarks of Yum! Brands: the Boxmaster (renamed Rostmaster) and the Twister (renamed Chefroll).. In 2023, Konstantin Kotov, a co-owner of the Rostic's brand, stated that he foresaw no difficulties in supplying food to the new chain, though he did note price increases for certain items from suppliers. For instance, the price of french fries doubled; however, since staple ingredients—such as chicken, buns, flatbreads, and lettuce—as well as beverages were sourced domestically in Russia, there would be no supply shortages. According to Kotov, suppliers had restructured their supply chains wherever necessary throughout 2022..

== See also ==
- Dodo Pizza
- Vkusno i tochka
