= Chicken Shack (Michigan) =

American restaurant chain

Chicken Shack Inc.
- Company type: Private
- Industry: Food service
- Founded: 1956
- Founders: John Sobeck; Iola Sobeck
- Area served: Metro Detroit
- Website: www.chickenshack.com

Chicken Shack is an American restaurant chain. The first branch was opened in Royal Oak, Michigan by John and Iola Sobeck in 1956. Today, the chain has 21 locations in the Metro Detroit area.

== See also ==
- List of fast-food chicken restaurants
