= Miss Millie's =

British fast-food restaurant chain

Miss Millie's Fried Chicken Limited
- Industry: Fast-food restaurant, Takeaway
- Founded: 1988, Bristol, England
- Founder: Harry Latham
- Headquarters: Bristol, England
- Area served: United Kingdom
- Products: Fried chicken, burgers, sides, desserts
- Number of employees: 40+
- Website: Official website

Miss Millie's Fried Chicken Limited, commonly known as Miss Millie's, is a British fast-food restaurant chain founded in 1988 in Bristol, England. The chain specialises in fried chicken and related menu items, operating across Southern England.

== History ==
Miss Millie's was founded by Harry Latham, who had previously worked alongside Colonel Sanders to introduce KFC to the UK in the 1960s. The business was originally incorporated under the name "Finger Lickin' Chicken Limited" in 1963 before rebranding to "Miss Millie's Fried Chicken Limited" in 1990.

The brand name "Miss Millie's" was chosen as a tribute to Colonel Sanders' daughter, Mildred. Miss Millie's remained a family-run business until it was sold to new owners in 2019.

In 2023, Miss Millie's signed a franchise partnership with Motor Fuel Group (MFG) to open locations at petrol station forecourts, marking the brand’s expansion beyond the South West region.

Later in 2023, the chain opened its first Bristol city-centre outlet in over 30 years as part of a company rebrand. Miss Millie's also announced plans at this time to expand its footprint across the UK, targeting up to 100 locations over the next five years.

== Recognition ==
Miss Millie’s Scotland concession was featured in the Forecourt Trader Awards 2024, recognising excellence in forecourt retail outlets.

== Community and cultural impact ==
Miss Millie's has operated in Bristol’s fast-food market since the late 1980s, sometimes engaging in local rivalries with other restaurants through their marketing campaigns. When American chain Popeyes opened in Bristol, Miss Millie's responded by launching a billboard campaign; this was covered by local news outlets.
