= Champy's Famous Fried Chicken =

American restaurant chain

Coordinates: 34.7593°N 87.6770°W

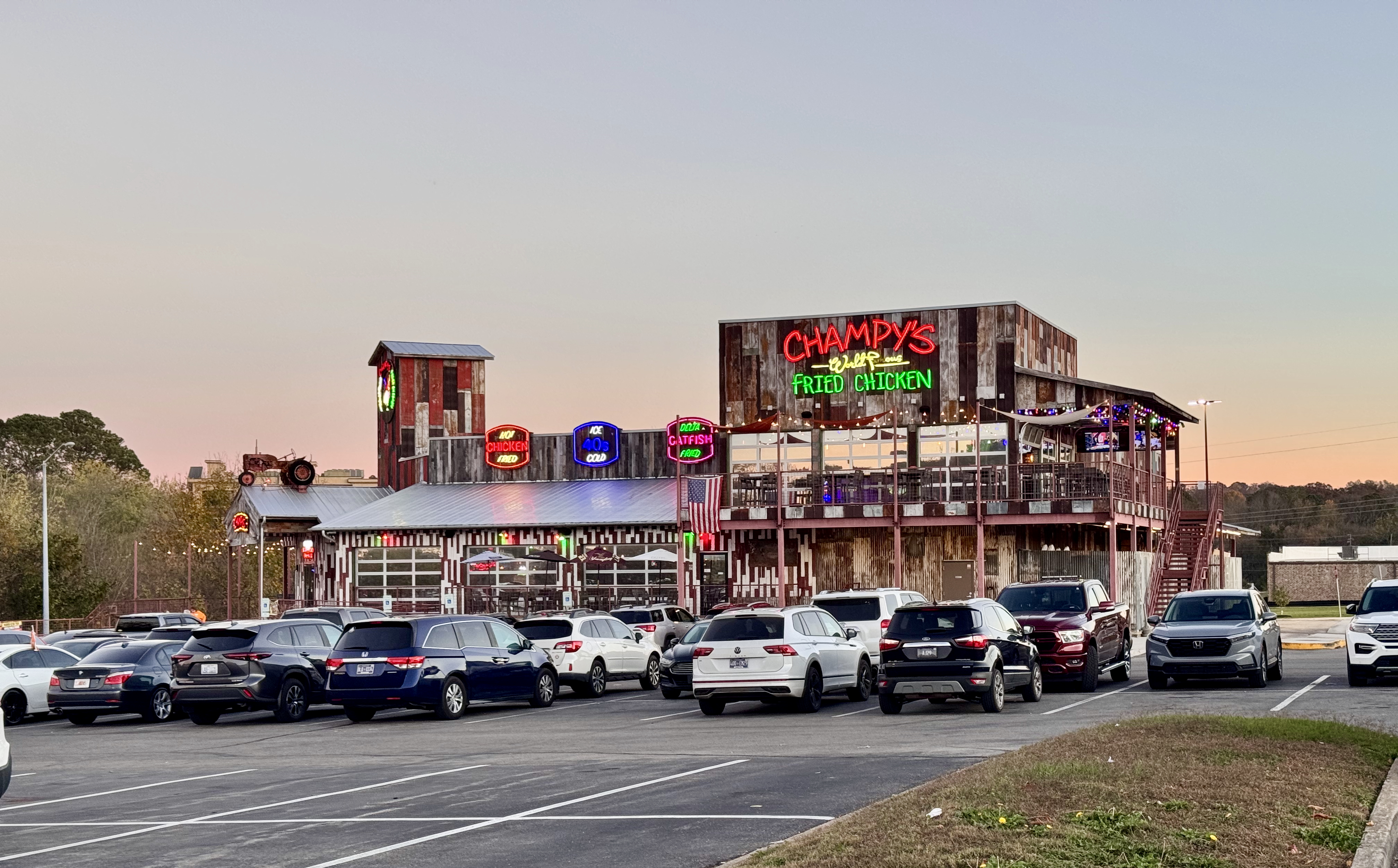
Champy's Famous Fried Chicken restaurant in Cleveland, Tennessee

Champy's World Famous Fried Chicken is a restaurant chain located in U.S. states of the Tennessee and Alabama.

== Locations ==
Seth and Crissy Champion opened the original restaurant in Chattanooga, Tennessee, in 2009. After Champy's launch in Chattanooga, the owners expanded the chain to several locations in Alabama. Their first location in Alabama was in Muscle Shoals, followed by locations in Daphne and Alabaster. As of 2024, there are eight locations throughout Tennessee and Alabama. Champy's menu is based on the original family recipes of the owners, and is modeled after the food and culture of the Mississippi Delta.

== Reviews ==
A review in The Chatter, a Chattanooga magazine, and the American magazine, Garden & Gun, spoke positively of the restaurant.

A local paper, The Nooga, offered a more mixed review of the menu and dining experience.
