= Fried chicken restaurant =

Type of restaurant

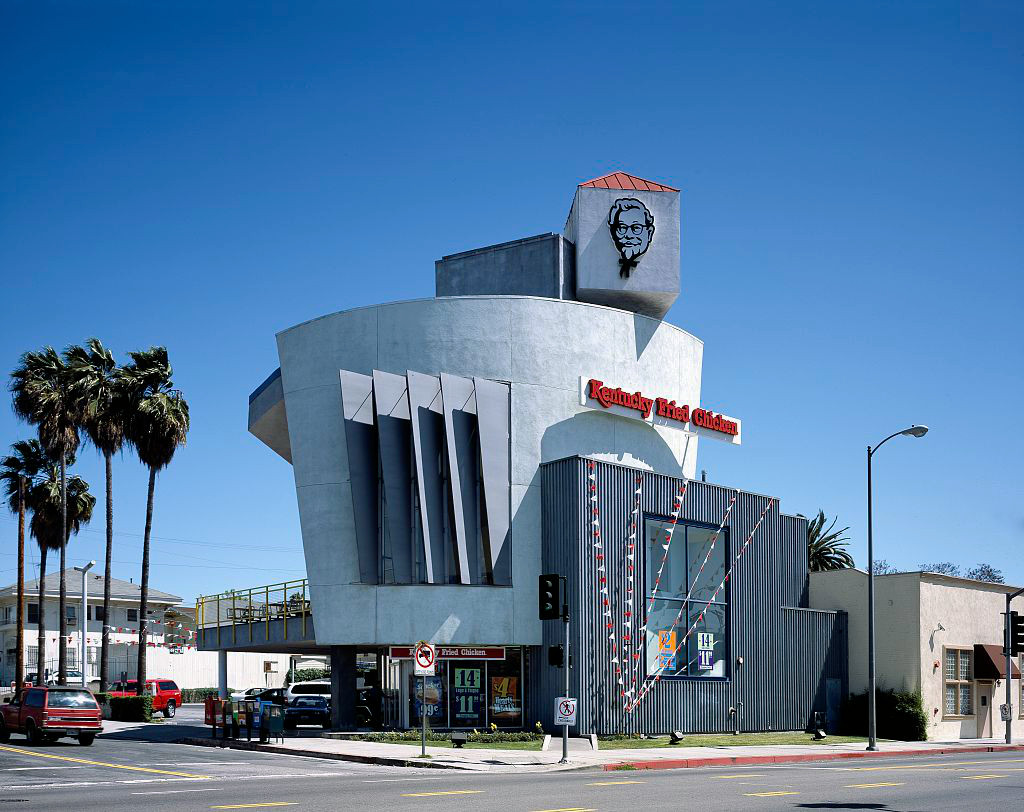
A Kentucky Fried Chicken outlet in Los Angeles, opened in 1990

A fried chicken restaurant is a fast food restaurant that serves (mainly) Southern fried chicken—usually chunks of chicken, battered or breaded and deep-fried.

== United States ==
The concept of the fried chicken restaurant originated in the United States. These restaurants may also serve other food items, such as roast or grilled chicken, seafood, or hamburgers. KFC (previously Kentucky Fried Chicken) is a well-known example. Others include:

- Baes Fried Chicken
- Bojangles'
- Brown's Chicken & Pasta
- Bush's Chicken
- Chick-Fil-A
- Chicken Delight
- Chicken Express
- Church's Texas Chicken
- Crown Fried Chicken
- World Famous Hotboys
- Golden Chick
- Gus's World Famous Fried Chicken
- Harold's Chicken Shack
- Joella's Hot Chicken
- Kennedy Fried Chicken
- KFC
- Krispy Krunchy Chicken
- Lee's Famous Recipe Chicken
- LoRell's Chicken Shack
- Mrs. Winner's
- Popeyes Louisiana Kitchen
- Raising Cane's Chicken Fingers
- Roy Rogers
- Smithfield's Chicken 'N Bar-B-Q
- Zaxby's

== Canada ==
Chains of fried chicken fast-food restaurants originating in Canada include Dixie Lee based in Napanee, Ontario and Mary Brown's based in Markham, Ontario. Several US-based chains also have outlets in Canada, including KFC and Popeyes Chicken & Biscuits.

== United Kingdom ==
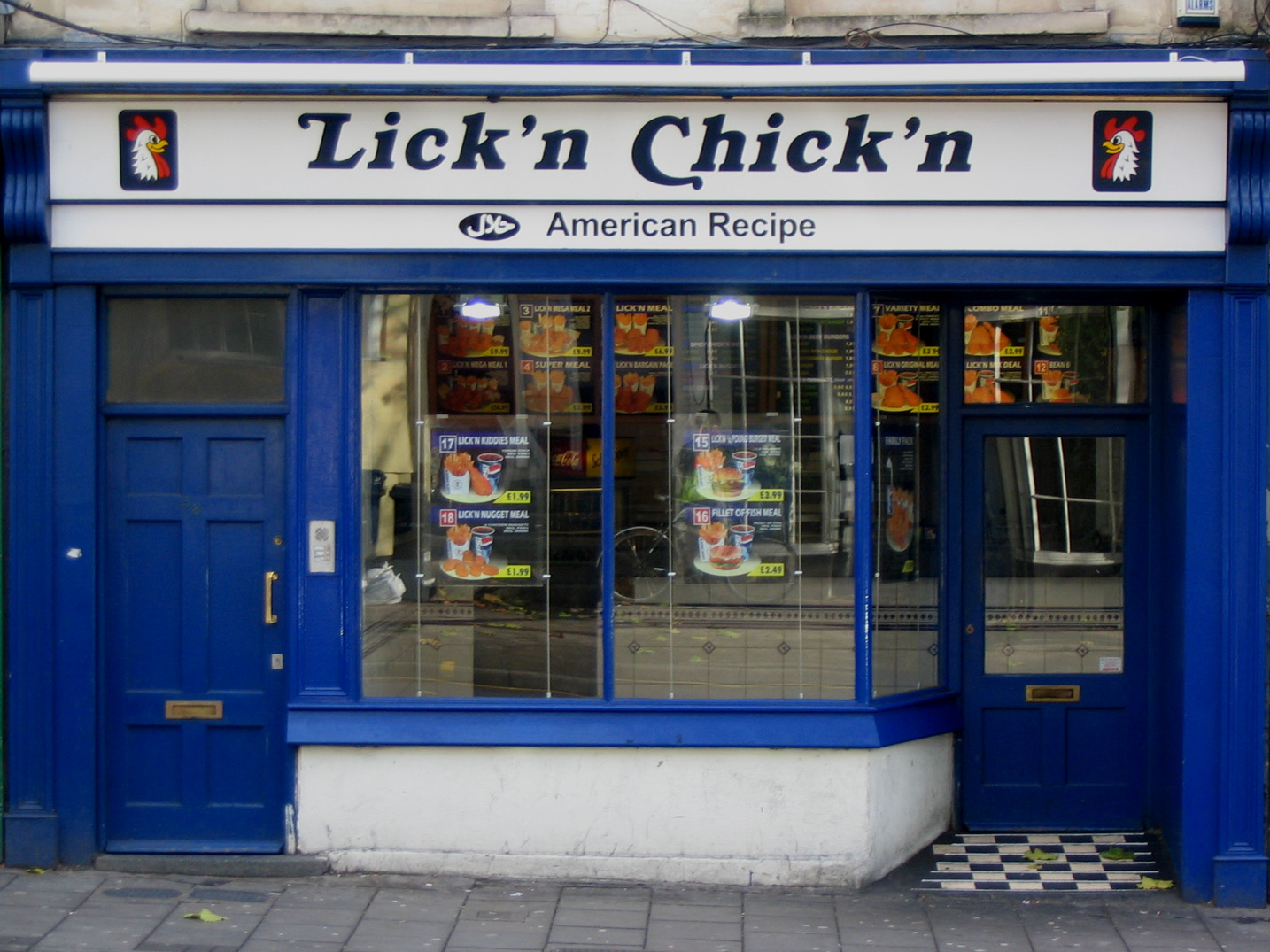
Lick'n Chick'n in Bristol

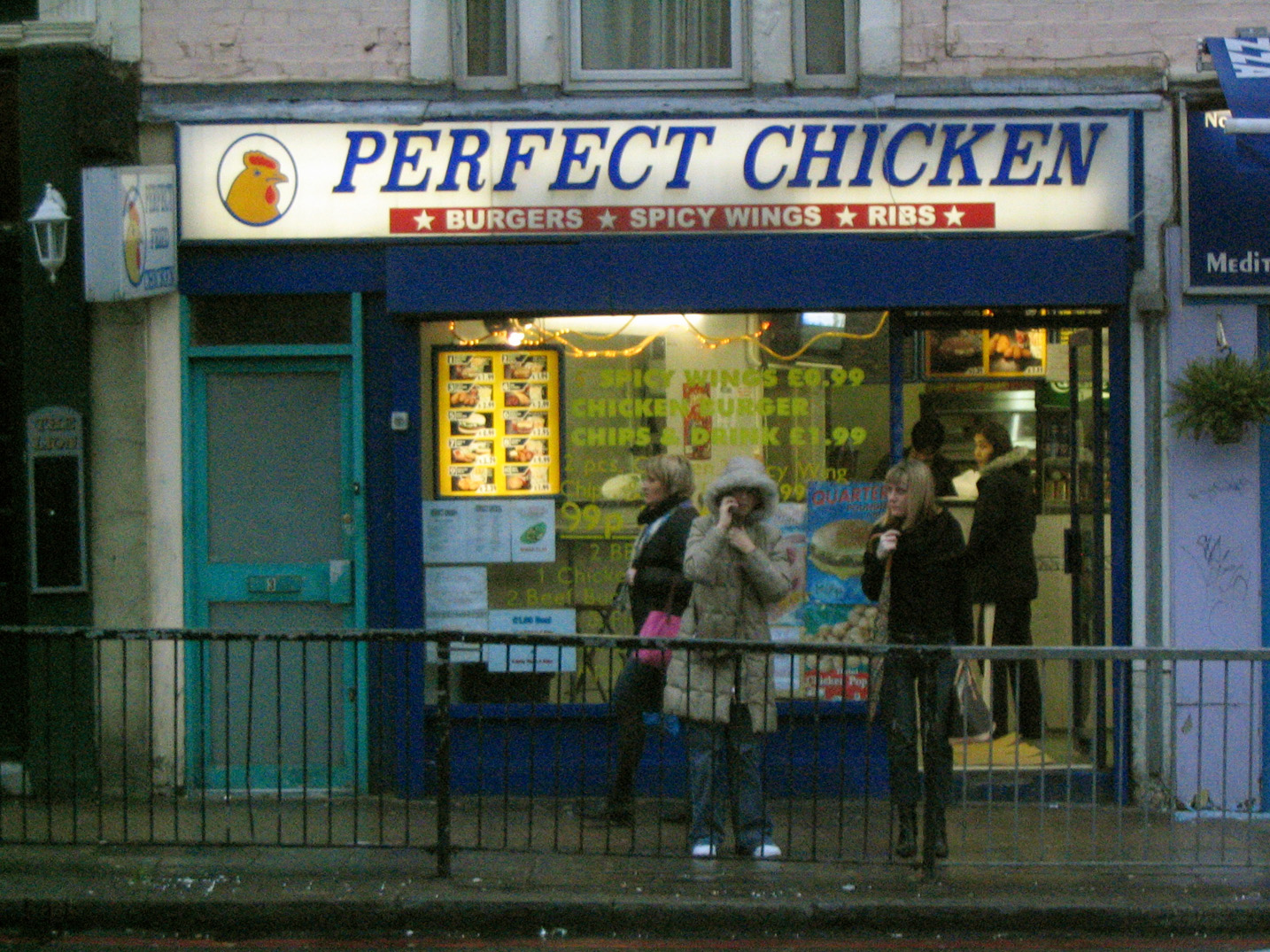
Perfect Chicken in Archway, London

Fried chicken restaurants are commonplace in inner city areas of the United Kingdom. The United Kingdom has one of the largest, fastest growing and most diverse fried chicken markets in the world, with about 1,000 individual brands and 1,700 outlets. Shop signs are commonly designed in a red, white and blue colour scheme, and include a drawing or cartoon of a chicken, as well as a reference to the Southern United States.

Especially popular in poor and ethnic minority neighbourhoods, fried chicken restaurants have been criticised for contributing to urban blight. For instance, the Labour MP for Tottenham, David Lammy, has said that the proliferation of chicken joints hampers prosperity in his constituency. Residents in Waltham Forest see them as "eyesores that encourage anti-social behaviour", according to a poll.

Chicken shops are nevertheless regarded by some people as important cultural institutions in the UK, particular for black and Asian communities. A 2017 article in Vice suggested that as meeting places and providers of cheap meals, they play an important role in neighbourhoods affected by the impacts of austerity and other government policies.

Other popular UK chicken brands include Chicken Cottage, Morley's, and Dixy Chicken.

== Other countries ==
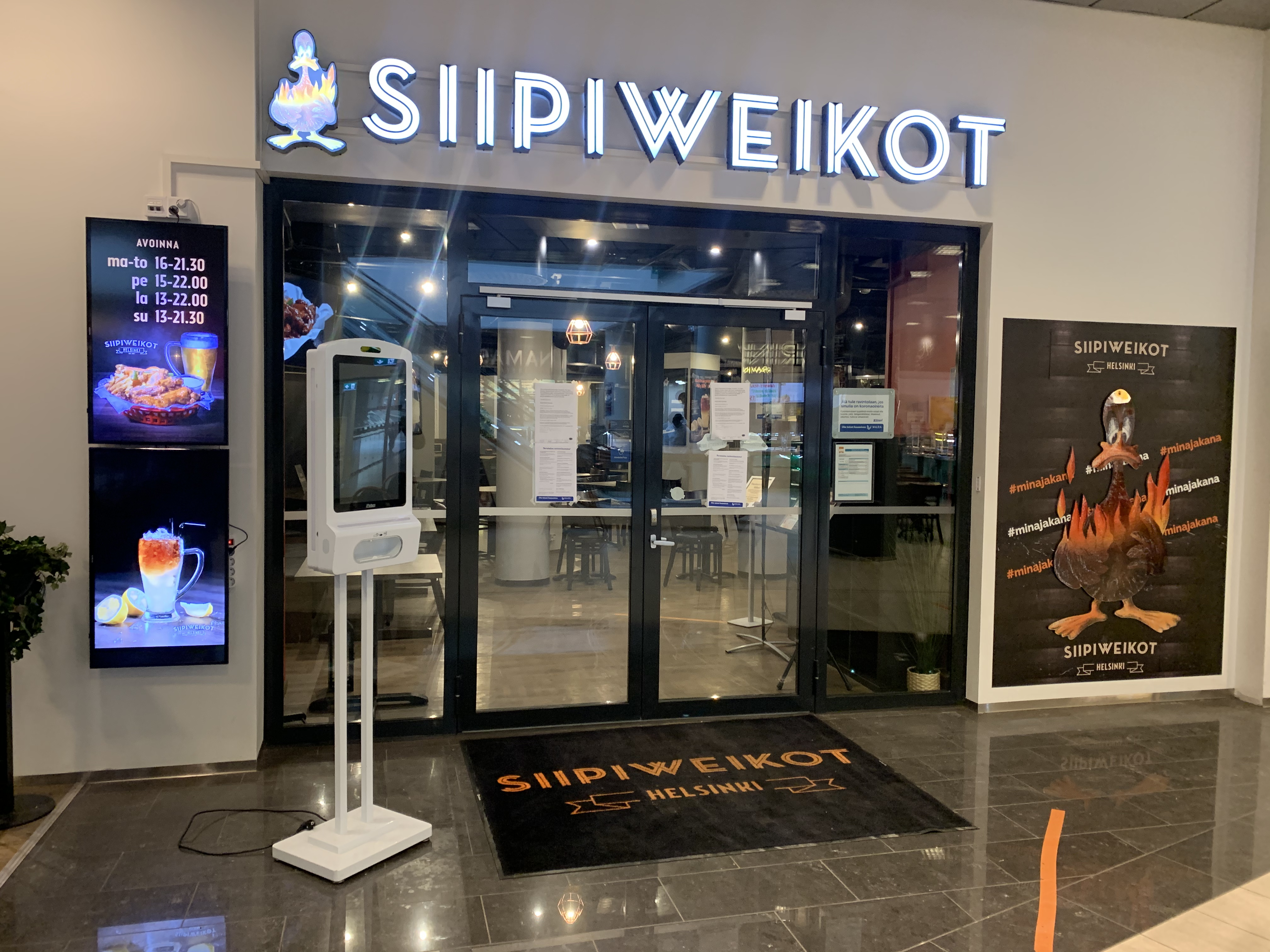
Entrance of Siipiweikot restaurant in Kaisaniemi, Helsinki, Finland

Australia

- Chooks Fresh & Tasty, originally named River Rooster, with, as of 2010, 39 stores, mainly in Western Australia. There is also Belles Hot Chicken, Country Fried Chicken, Oporto and Red Rooster.

Guatemala

- Pollo Campero, a fried chicken restaurant chain with over 200 locations in twelve countries, including 50 in the United States.

Ireland

- Hillbillys, a Cork based fried chicken restaurant with locations throughout Ireland
- Chicken Hut, Limerick fried chicken outlet
- John Grace Chicken, Cork City fried chicken outlet

Indonesia

- California Fried Chicken, an Indonesian fast food restaurant chain principally serving fried chicken. Its primary competitors are KFC, McDonald's, A&W, and Texas Chicken, and as of March 2019, it runs 269 locations across Indonesia.
- There are types of Indonesia (only) fried chicken restaurant such as D'Besto, Sabana (fried chicken restaurant) , d'kriuk, etc

Nigeria

- Tastee Fried Chicken, a fast food fried chicken restaurant with eight locations, based in Lagos, Nigeria.

Philippines

- Jollibee, a fast food chain with over 1500 branches worldwide.
- Max's Restaurant, with over 100 branches in the Philippines and several more in the United States.

South Africa

- Chicken Licken
- Hungry Lion

South Korea

- Bonchon Chicken, the most famous fried chicken chain of South Korea, with over 338 branches in the South Korea, Asia, Middle East and United States.

Taiwan

- TKK Fried Chicken, most popular Taiwanese fried chicken restaurant in Taiwan and overseas.

== See also ==
- Chicken restaurant
- List of fast-food chicken restaurants
- National Fried Chicken Day
