= Flavor-Crisp =

Food seasoning and breading brand

- Company type: Private
- Industry: Food processing, foodservice products
- Founded: 1960 (as part of Ballantyne of Omaha, Inc.)
- Area served: North and Central America
- Products: Seasoning blends, breading products, pressure fryers
- Parent: Elmwood Capital LLC
- Website: flavor-crisp.com

Flavor-Crisp (also known as Chicken on the Run or Flavor-Crisp: Chicken on the Run) is a brand of seasoned breading and commercial cooking equipment primarily used in the preparation of fried foods. Established in the 1960s as part of Ballantyne of Omaha, Inc., Flavor-Crisp is best known for its fried chicken seasoning blends. The company also produced commercial cooking equipment, including pressure fryers, though appliance manufacturing has since ceased. Flavor-Crisp is credited with popularizing Jojo potatoes, a seasoned potato wedge dish popular in the Pacific Northwest, Ohio, and New York.

In 2018, Flavor-Crisp was acquired by Elmwood Capital, LLC and remains independently led and managed.

== History ==
Flavor-Crisp originated in 1960 as part of Ballantyne of Omaha, Inc., a Nebraska-based fabrication company that primarily manufactured motion picture equipment and follow spotlights. Seeking to diversify, Ballantyne developed Flavor-Crisp to provide food service equipment and seasonings, selling primarily to convenience stores, fast-food operators, and equipment suppliers.

In 1960, the company trademarked its flagship product — a commercial deep-fat pressure fryer — which helped produce consistently crispy fried foods. The breading blend Chicken on the Run was introduced soon after, becoming the brand's best-known product. Around this time, Flavor-Crisp seasoning was adopted in the Pacific Northwest for fried potato wedges, later known as Jojo potatoes.

Through the 1980s and 1990s, Flavor-Crisp expanded distribution across the United States and Canada. Products were adopted by family restaurants, grocery stores, and institutional kitchens.

By 2004, Ballantyne of Omaha announced it was phasing out its restaurant equipment product line consisting of smokers, ventilation hoods and pressure fryers. Ballantyne of Omaha continued to supply parts to its installed equipment customer base and distributed its “Flavor Crisp” marinade and breading products, as well as support its “Chicken-On-The-Run” and “BBQ-On-The-Run” programs through 2008. Flavor-Crisp discontinued manufacturing fryers and other appliances, focusing instead on breading, marinades, and rubs. After restructuring, Ballantyne of Omaha eventually divested its Flavor-Crisp division in 2008 to one of its retired executives, and Flavor-Crisp was later acquired by Elmwood Capital LLC in 2018.

== Products ==
=== Seasoned Breading & Batters ===
The flagship line includes:

- Chicken on the Run Fine Grind Seasoned Coater Breading (bleached wheat flour, salt, spices, coloring), designed for advance breading up to 18 hours before frying.
- Chicken on the Run Medium Grind All-Purpose Breading & Batter (bleached wheat flour, yellow corn flour, soybean oil, salt, spices, coloring), formulated for use within one hour before frying.

=== Marinades & Seasonings ===
Flavor-Crisp offers marinades and rubs for poultry, beef, pork, seafood, and vegetables. Popular items include the Marinade Mix, Pork & Beef Rub, and Fish & Poultry Rub.

=== Commercial Cooking Equipment ===
For decades, Flavor-Crisp manufactured commercial pressure fryers and slow roast ovens. These appliances are no longer produced, though many remain in operation.

== Uses ==
Flavor-Crisp products are used in the preparation of fried chicken, fish, seafood, vegetables, and Jojo potatoes. The seasonings are also used for roasting, grilling, and institutional catering.

== Restaurants ==
Flavor-Crisp-branded fried chicken restaurants operated in parts of the U.S. and Canada during the mid-to-late 20th century. Today, while the restaurants no longer exist, the breading and seasoning products remain widely used in foodservice establishments across North America.

== Awards and Legacy ==
- In 2023, Flavor-Crisp seasonings were credited with the winning breaded pork tenderloin sandwich in Iowa (Cliff's Place, Manning), awarded by the Iowa Pork Producers Association; finishing in 1st place out of 774 submissions.
- Flavor-Crisp's role in popularizing Jojo potatoes is noted in The Seattle Times as part of Pacific Northwest culinary history.

== See also ==
- Pressure frying
- Fried chicken
