= Howlin' Ray's =

American restaurant chain

- Company type: Private
- Industry: Restaurant
- Genre: Fast food
- Founded: 2015; Los Angeles, California
- Founders: Johnny Ray Zone; Amanda Chapman
- Number of locations: 3 (June 9, 2025)
- Area served: California; Nevada
- Products: Hot chicken; French fries; Collard greens; Vinegar slaw; Macaroni salad; Potato salad; Banana pudding
- Owner: Johnny Ray Zone; Amanda Chapman
- Website: www.howlinrays.com

Howlin' Ray's is an American fast food restaurant chain that specializes in hot chicken. Founded in 2015 by Los Angeles chef Johnny Ray Zone and his wife Amanda Chapman, it has since expanded to three locations: Chinatown, Los Angeles, Pasadena, California, and Las Vegas.

== History ==
In late 2014, Zone visited Nashville, Tennessee while working a brief stint at chef Sean Brock's restaurant Husk in the city. There, he was introduced to hot chicken and instantly fell in love with it. When he returned to Los Angeles, Zone shared his newfound interest in hot chicken with Chapman. Before long, they traveled back to Nashville to learn more about hot chicken and its culture. They tasted some of the best examples of hot chicken, from restaurants such as Prince's, Hattie B's, 400 Degrees and Bolton's. The experience inspired Zone to find the perfect balance between the spicy, sweet and savory elements of the dish while keeping it authentic.

In June 2015, the couple opened the first food truck that exclusively sold hot chicken on the West Coast. They named their business "Howlin' Ray's" after Zone's late father Ray Zone. It drew increasingly large crowds, partly due to the success of their Hot Chicken Sando, a sandwich that Chapman created on a whim during a routine stop after buying some buns from a local hamburger stand. The truck made its final stop on November 1 at Alibi Room in Culver City, since Zone and Chapman were planning to transition the business to a brick and mortar location. They briefly partnered with restaurateur David Reiss, with plans to slightly expand the menu to utilize all resources in the kitchen, add a bar, and open the restaurant at Hollywood's Littlefork location on November 17, 2015. However, they pulled out of the deal as they were unable to settle on agreeable terms for both parties.

The first Howlin' Ray's restaurant opened inside the Far East Plaza in Chinatown, Los Angeles, on April 27, 2016. Zone chose this location because it spanned the neighborhoods of Silver Lake and Arts District, which were the two areas where his food truck gained the most popularity. The restaurant was a huge success, notably attracting extremely long lines throughout its opening hours. It has also been credited for popularizing hot chicken in Los Angeles; dozens of similar restaurants opened in the city over the next few years, but Howlin' Ray's has remained the most popular.

In June 2019, it was announced that Howlin' Ray's would open a second location in Pasadena, which Zone and Chapman chose for their love of the city, where they had also recently moved to. They aimed to create a more family-oriented environment and provide more efficient service, hoping to eliminate long lines. Construction began in early 2021, and the Pasadena Howlin' Ray's opened in November 2022.

The third location opened on June 9, 2025, as part of the Venetian Las Vegas casino hotel's Via Via food hall.

== Menu ==
The menu offers fried chicken as "Quarter Bird" (breast and wing or leg and thigh), "Half Bird" (both combinations), tenders, wings, and chicken and waffles. Chicken is served with bread and pickles. Sides include collard greens, macaroni salad (made with pimento cheese), vinegar slaw, shake fries, potato salad and banana pudding. The Sando consists of boneless chicken breast and is served with coleslaw, comeback sauce, pickles and a butter bun. There are two variations of the Sando: Luis-style, in which the chicken is topped with melted cheddar cheese and put between two slices of buttered and griddled toast (like a patty melt), and JoJo-style, a waffle sandwich with boneless breast and melted cheddar. French fries are prepared in several styles: Mario, covered in comeback sauce, cheddar, vinegar slaw and pickles and mixed with cut-up chunks of chicken; Matt, topped with collard greens, cut-up bacon, comeback sauce, braised tomatoes and melted cheddar and served with a side of pot liquor; and Juicy, lightly coated with extra-hot seasoning, laced with Crystal Hot Sauce and combined with Trappey's hot pepper vinegar, slaw, and comeback sauce. The styles of the Sando and fries are named after members of the Howlin' crew. The chicken spice levels range from "country" (no heat) to "howlin'", which is spiced with cayenne and extracts of habanero, ghost pepper and red savina. The restaurant also offers even hotter versions, "Howlin' plus" and "Howlin' plus plus", which are seasoned with Carolina Reapers and scorpion peppers and require customers to sign a waiver.

== Marketing ==
In December 2019, Howlin' Ray's collaborated with singer Post Malone for a delivery project on Postmates, originally scheduled to run from December 12 to 14. For this campaign, Howlin' Ray's created a sandwich called "Ghost Malone", made with ghost pepper Monterey Jack cheese. The event experienced an unexpectedly high surge in demand, with hundreds of orders submitted immediately after its launch. This led to complications, including delivery drivers canceling orders, traffic backing up, and the kitchen becoming overwhelmed with preparation demands, to the extent that Howlin' Ray's and Postmates ended the event prematurely.

In April 2022, Howlin' Ray's entered another collaboration with Postmates to launch Nugs chicken nuggets, which were available on the platform for five days until April 25.

In January 2023, Howlin' Ray's collaborated with Adidas to release a line of sneakers called Adilicious. It was launched on January 23 in retail stores with a limited amount of sneakers available at the Howlin' Ray's in Pasadena.

In October 2023, Howlin' Ray's collaborated with rapper Offset to release the Howlin' Ween Offset Shake Box, consisting of chicken nuggets and Offset's own sauce Southern Drip, which was inspired by a chicken dipping sauce that originated in North Carolina in the 1920s. Offset designed the meal box with Postmates, where it was available exclusively from October 25 to 31 in the Los Angeles area.

In October 2025, Howlin' Ray's collaborated with rapper Warren G to create a pop-up kitchen in Long Beach, California. A limited-edition entry listed under "Howlin' Ray's Long Beach" on Postmates allowed customers to choose from three combination meal options, some of which were accompanied by exclusive sticker sets or T-shirts.
