= Krispy =

Krispy may refer to:

- "Krispy" (song), song from album Due Season by hip-hop artist Kia Shine
- Krispy (cracker), a saltine or soda cracker

== See also ==
- Krispy Kreme, an American doughnut company
- Krispy Krunchy Chicken, an American fried chicken company
