= Chicken Licken =

Chicken Licken can refer to:

- Henny Penny, also known as "Chicken Little" or "Chicken Licken", a European folk tale about a little chicken believing the sky is falling.
- Chicken Licken (restaurant), an African fast food chain
