= Haiderzai, Pishin =

Town in Balochistan, Pakistan

Haiderzai is a town situated in the Pishin District of Baluchistan province, Pakistan. The caste of the people is "Syed", therefore they are known as Haiderzei syedan. Haiderzai comprises three villages: Killi Mandan, Killi Nasozai and Killi Masterzai.

== Culture ==
Haiderzai known for tobacco dealing and business all over the world. It has a bazaar known as Yaru which can supply items of everyday needs. Haiderzai has electricity, gas stations, and telephone and mobile phone services. It has famous hotels named the Ajwa Hotel Yaru and the Sharjah Hotel, which is most famous for its culture and spicy dishes, broast, rosh, saji, soap, chai and mustang cake.
