= Zesto =

Zesto may refer to:

- Zesto Drive-In, a former chain of American drive-in restaurants
- Zest-O Corporation, one of the largest beverage companies in the Philippines, and its flagship product: Zest-O juice drink
- ZESTO, a type of savings account offered by RCI Banque, a France-based international company
