= Joella's Hot Chicken =

Regional fast food chicken restaurant chain

- Company type: Subsidiary
- Industry: Fast food
- Founded: 2015; 11 years ago in Louisville, Kentucky
- Founder: Tony Palombino
- Headquarters: Louisville, Kentucky, US
- Number of locations: 9 (2025)
- Area served: Kentucky, Indiana, Ohio
- Products: Nashville hot chicken
- Parent: Schulte Restaurant Group
- Website: joellas.com

Joella's Hot Chicken is a fast food chain founded in Louisville, Kentucky.

== Description ==
The restaurant chain is known for serving Nashville hot chicken. It serves chicken tenders, wings, and bone-in chicken, including half and quarter-chickens, chicken and waffles, and chicken burgers. The chain also serves a vegan chicken alternative made with peas, carrots, potatoes, and beetroot.

The chicken is prepared in a choice of seven spice levels. The lowest spice level is Southern fried chicken, which has no heat, while the highest spice level requires customers to sign a waiver before eating. In 2025, the chain stopped serving whole wings and replaced them with drumettes and flats.

It also serves various sides including french fries, macaroni and cheese, kale salad, coleslaw, banana pudding, potato salad, and green beans.

== History ==
The first location was opened by Tony Palombino in Louisville, Kentucky in 2015. Palombino also founded Boombozz Taphouse in 1998. He invested approximately $350,000 into opening the first location. A second location was opened a few months later in January 2016 in Lexington. By 2019, the chain subsequently opened locations in Florida, Ohio, Georgia, and Indiana. It was purchased by Schulte Restaurant Group in 2018.

Not all of the new locations did well and were quickly closed. In Indiana, Joella's opened a restaurant in Broad Ripple in October 2018 and closed in January 2025. Joella's opened a restaurant in Bloomington in January 2019, right next door to a Chick-fil-a, only to close four years later in November 2023.

In Florida, Joella's opened and quickly closed three restaurants. A location in Largo opened in September 2019 and closed in October 2024. A location in Seminole opened in October 2019 and closed by the end of 2021. A location in Melbourne opened in October 2019 and closed in June 2023.

In the Atlanta metropolitan area in Georgia, Joella's opened four restaurants in 2019 only to have all four restaurants be closed by December 2023. In Ohio, Joella's opened a restaurant in Cincinnati in June 2018 and closed in October 2021.

These closed restaurants represent over half of the chain's locations to date and most of the closures are due to the impact of the COVID-19 pandemic on the restaurant industry, which coincided with their individual openings occurring just a few months prior to the start of the pandemic.

== Legal ==
In 2020, the fast food chain Zaxby's filed a trademark infringement lawsuit alleging that Joella's logo was too similar to the Zaxby's logo.
