= Chicken Licken (restaurant) =

South African fast-food chain

Golden Fried Chicken (Pty) Ltd

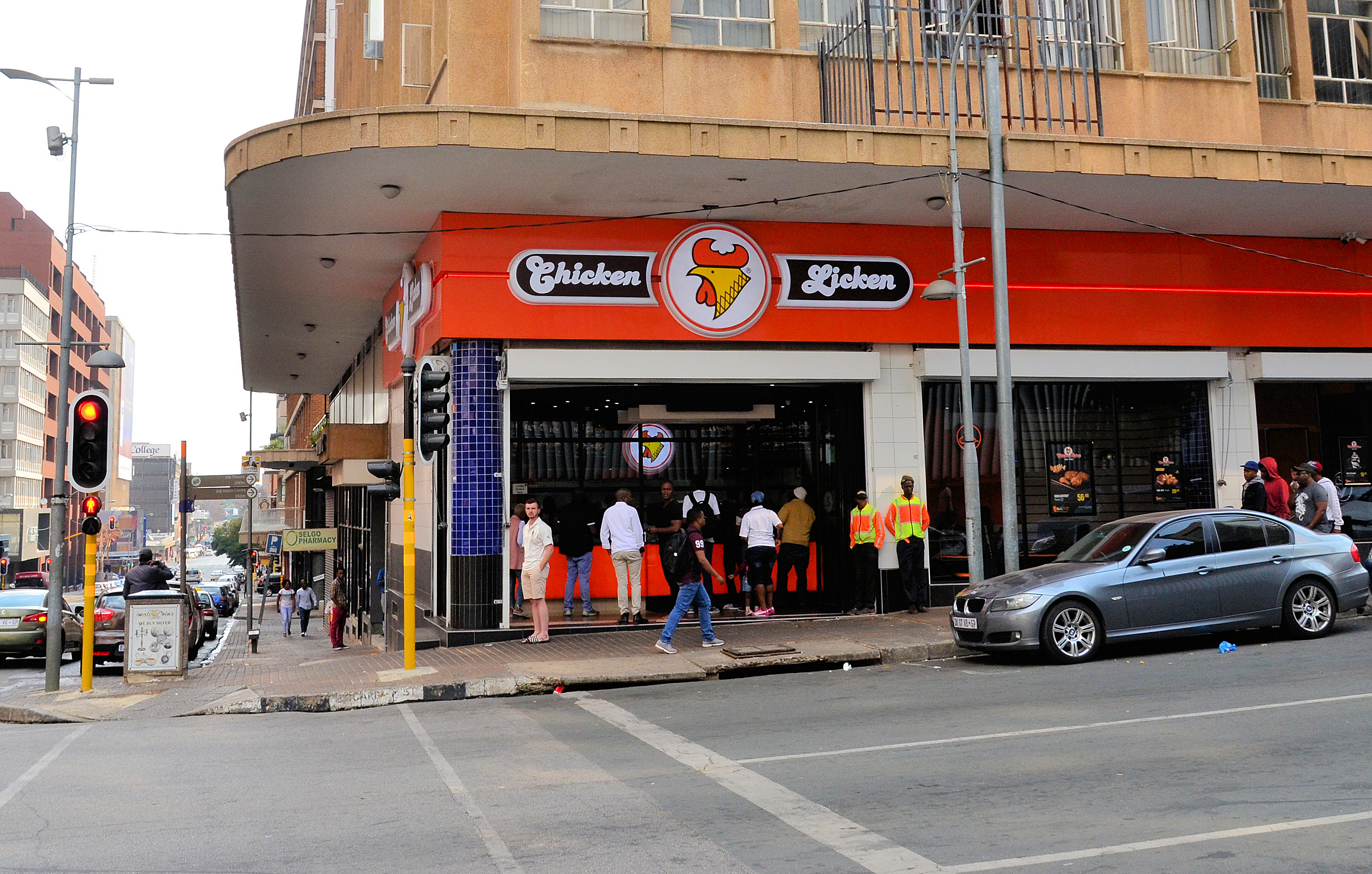
- Braamfontein, Johannesburg location
- Trade name: Chicken Licken
- Type: Private
- Industry: Fast food Franchising
- Founded: Ridgeway, Gauteng 1981; 45 years ago
- Founder: George Sombonos (1949–2016)
- Headquarters: Johannesburg, South Africa
- Number of locations: 259 (2013)
- Key people: Chantal Sombonos
- Products: Fried chicken
- Revenue: R1.3 billion (2013)
- Website: www.chickenlicken.co.za

Chicken Licken is a South African fast-food fried chicken restaurant chain. The company had a 5% share of South Africa's fast food market in 2010, tying with McDonald's. According to a case study published by the Henny Penny Corporation in 2011, Chicken Licken is the "largest non-American-owned fried chicken franchise in the world".

== History ==
Chicken Licken was founded in South Africa by George Sombonos, the son of a Greek immigrant restaurant owner. Sombonos learned the restaurant trade in the 1970s at the Dairy Den, his father's restaurant in Ridgeway, a suburb in the southern Inner City region of Johannesburg. KFC entered the South African market in 1971. Sombonos bought Chicken Licken's secret fried chicken recipe from the owner of a fast food outlet in Waco, Texas, for US $1,000 while touring the United States in 1972 and introduced it to the Dairy Den. In 1975 he started serving black customers in their cars when apartheid segregation laws restricted their access to restaurants. In 1976 he introduced the drive-through restaurant concept to the Dairy Den after seeing it at Wendy's restaurants in the United States.

His father died in 1980 and Sombonos opened the first Chicken Licken restaurant in 1981 on the site of the Dairy Den. In 1982 he gave away the first two franchises, based in Soweto and Alexandra, as the company was still unknown and he was unable to sell them. Chicken Licken's presence in the townships during apartheid helped it to establish a loyal customer base among black South Africans. However, internal resistance to apartheid intensified in the mid-1980s and the company's operations in the townships were adversely affected by civil unrest until 1991. The company's association with the townships has also presented a challenge to growth outside the townships in a changing South Africa. George's daughter Chantal started working at Chicken Licken in 2001, and is next in line to succeed him running the family-owned business.

== Locations ==
Initially, new Chicken Licken outlets were only opened in South African townships. Since the apartheid era ended in 1994, the black middle class has moved out of the townships and the company has changed its focus to expanding in higher income areas and upmarket shopping malls. As of 2013, there are 247 Chicken Licken outlets in South Africa and 12 outlets in Botswana. As of 2012 only 12 of the Chicken Licken outlets in South Africa are owned by the company, including the company's six most successful restaurants.

Attempts to establish a presence in other African countries have been unsuccessful. Outlets in Zimbabwe, Nigeria and Mauritius were closed down due to problems with franchisees and the supply of chickens, electricity and foreign exchange for ingredients. Outlets in Lesotho and Swaziland in southern Africa were also closed down due to unpleasant business experiences. As of 2025 there talks about opening a store in Bronx, NY.

=== Countries ===
- Botswana – 18 outlets (2021)
- South Africa – 250 outlets (2013)

== Branding ==
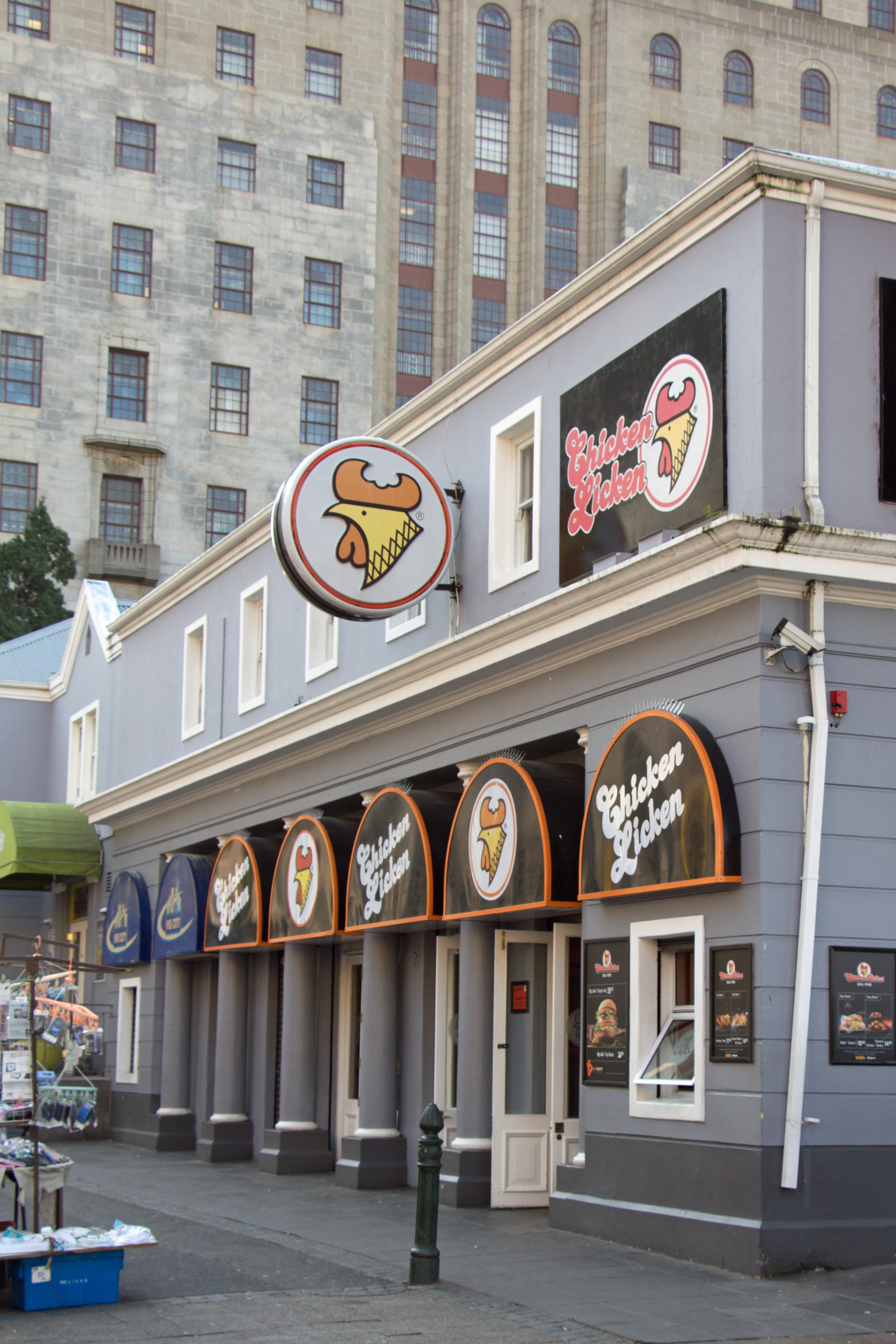
Grand Parade, Cape Town

In 1981 Sombonos set up Golden Fried Chicken (Pty) Ltd and registered the trading name Chicken Licken, one of the names of the Henny Penny fable which was suggested by a waiter. The restaurants and packaging have been upgraded and the menu is updated annually, but the company logo has remained unchanged since 1981. Chicken Licken's products cater to the tastes of the local population. The company's most popular product is its hot wings introduced in 1992.

Registered trademarks in South Africa include:

- Soul Food
- Full house
- Hot wings
- Popcorn Chicken

Golden Fried Chicken (Pty) Ltd, trading as Chicken Licken, owns the trademark for the word soul in South Africa with respect to "restaurants, snack bars, cafes, fast food outlets, canteens and roadhouses; services connected with the sale and distribution of foodstuffs and refreshments; catering".

Chicken Licken's food is positioned as a more affordable option than that of its main competitors in South Africa, KFC and Nando's. Chicken Licken was ranked second after KFC in the Fast Food and Restaurant Chains category of the Sunday Times Markinor 2007 Top Brands Survey, followed closely by Nando's which was ranked second in the previous year. The survey was based on consumer interviews and took into account factors such as brand awareness and trust.

Chicken Licken was a client of the Net#work BBDO advertising agency until 2016 when advertising agency Joe Public United sold its soul. The brand is known for its humorous television commercials. Early Chicken Licken commercials were conceptualised by and starred actor and creative director Joe Mafela. Mafela starred in the Zulu television comedy series 'Sgudi 'Snaysi (1986–1992), and authored the company's "It's good, good, good, it's good its nice" jingle during the making of a Chicken Licken commercial in 1986. A subsequent retro style advertising campaign featured Dr CL Phunk, a character played by African-American actor Sydney Hall who dispenses Chicken Licken as a cure-all. In 2007 George Sombonos won the inaugural Creative Circle's Marketer of the Year award for advertising agency clients for "25 Yrs of Soul", a nostalgic commercial featuring the 1983 hit song "Burn Out" by local musician Sipho "Hotstix" Mabuse. In 2013 he won the Marketing Leadership and Innovation Award category of the Loerie Awards.

== Suppliers ==
Chicken Licken obtains its chickens from Rainbow Chicken Limited, a JSE-listed company which is South Africa's largest producer of chickens. It has imported chickens from Brazil in the past when Brazilian exporters began undercutting Rainbow and other South African chicken farmers and flooding the market with surplus chicken. It obtains its spices from Robertsons Spices, a Unilever brand of herbs and spices. Chicken Licken uses fryers supplied by Henny Penny, an American manufacturer of cooking equipment used by major fast food companies such as KFC and McDonald's.

== Controversies and Lawsuits ==
Over the years, Chicken Licken has embarked on a hostile campaign to enforce its trademark of the word "soul", aggressively targeting any business, no matter how big or small, that uses the word in its name or as a product. Chicken Licken listed the word "soul" in 1994 as a trademark under the classes of 29 and 30, utilising the word as part of their lexicon in marketing campaigns and product names. The trademark meant that the word could not be used by anyone else in trade to describe certain types of food and drink, but was later extended to include restaurants and food services.

Targets of lawsuits over the years have included vegan restaurants, independent stores, cafes, food manufacturers, startups, and guest lodges. In almost all instances, the targets of the legal actions have been small businesses that could be easily intimidated by the R3 billion corporate.

The first noted instance to receive widespread publicity occurred when the fast food giant took legal action against Durban-based vegan restaurant Oh My Soul and frozen food manufacturer We Are Food in 2019. Oh My Soul opened its doors in September 2018, serving vegan meals that included "licken" and "vish". Six months after opening, owners Tallulah and Richard Duffin, received a letter of demand from Chicken Licken's attorney Ron Wheeldon alleging infringement of its trademark "soul".

Following a three-week negotiation, the Duffins agreed to rebrand their "licken" as "vicken" and their "soul salad" as a "sacred salad", but refused to rebrand their store. Chicken Licken refused to accept this and filed an urgent adjudication; a week later, the Duffins had to appear in the KwaZulu-Natal High Court. The case was heard and a judgement in favour of Oh My Soul Cafe was given on 25 March 2019, with KwaZulu-Natal High Court judge Dhayanithie Pillay ruling that the use of the term "soul" by Chicken Licken was “...philosophically, ideologically and in reality the very antithesis of veganism. Vegans are discerning consumers most unlikely to confuse or associate 'Oh My Soul' with the applicant’s conception of 'soul' in whatever form its trademarks appear".

At the same time, Chicken Licken had started legal action against Durban frozen food startup We Are Food, owned by sisters Jane and Amy Weare. The sisters had included in their meal options a clean-eating range which included several vegan "Soul Bowls". Chicken Licken argued that a "soul bowl" was not a recognised dish and that the sisters were in contravention of Chicken Licken's trademark. After seeking legal advice, We Are Food opted to rebrand their Soul Bowls to Vegan Bowls rather than tie themselves up in a legal battle with the fast food giant.

Other cases against South African small businesses included legal action taken against Soulsa in 2009, Native Soul, East Coast Soul Kitchen, Soulhouse, Soul Kitchen, Soul Souvlaki, and Tha'phe' Soul Food.

== See also ==
- List of fast-food chicken restaurants
