= Angry Chickz =

American fast food restaurant chain

- Trade name: Angry Chickz
- Industry: Restaurants
- Genre: Fast food restaurant
- Founded: 2018; 8 years ago Los Angeles, California
- Founder: David Mkhitaryan
- Headquarters: Sherman Oaks, California, United States
- Number of locations: ▲46 (2026)
- Website: https://www.angrychickz.com

Angry Chickz is an American fast food restaurant chain specializing in hot chicken with various spice levels. It primarily operates in California and also has locations in Arizona, Nevada, and Texas.

== History ==
In 2018, Mkhitaryan and his Wife opened the first Angry Chickz location in East Hollywood and became popular with foodies.

In October 2025, they partnered with Saratoga Investment, in the goal of expanding the company to over 50 locations by the end of 2026.

== Locations ==
As of October 2025, Angry Chickz has 33 locations in the United States. It has 30 locations in California, and one each in Arizona, Nevada, and Texas.

== Menu ==
The menu focuses on Nashville Hot chicken, which can be in chicken sandwiches and bowls with chicken and macaroni and cheese, chicken and french fries, or chicken and coleslaw and can be from country, which has no spice, to angry, which is coated with Carolina Reaper pepper dust which requires a waiver to be signed to eat.
