= L. A. M. Phelan =

American businessman and inventor

Louis Austin Merritt Phelan
- Born: February 10, 1884
- Died: October 1, 1971 (aged 87)
- Occupation(s): businessman and inventor

L. A. M. Phelan (1884–1971) was an American businessman and inventor. He is known mainly as inventor of the broaster equipment and method for pressure-cooking chicken, and founder of the Broaster Company.

== Biography ==
In the late 19th and early 20th centuries Phelan worked on invention and development with Goodyear, Monsanto, American Car and Foundry, and Allis-Chalmers, on the Panama Canal project, as well others in the fields of carton making, oil burners, and steam traps.

In the 1910s Phelan invented and developed various forms of the mercury switch, on which he obtained 52 patents. In 1920 he formed the Absolute Con-Tac-Tor Corporation to manufacture and market contactor mercury switches. Through a series of mergers, this technology became an important early product of Honeywell.

In 1928, Phelan became head of the Taylor Freezer Corp. (now the Taylor Company), a manufacturer of conventional and soft serve commercial ice cream freezers. In 1946 he organized more than 40 of Taylor's employees as Tekni-Craft, one of America's first worker cooperatives, to which he sold Taylor's manufacturing and distribution rights. Phelan also invented the "Zest-O-Mat" frozen custard freezer and founded Zesto Products Dairy, which grew into a chain of more than 50 drive-in restaurants.

From 1936 to 1949 he operated a manufacturer of X-ray tubes.

In the early 1950s, approximately the same time as Colonel Harlan Sanders began franchising his KFC restaurant chain, Phelan developed the broasting method of cooking chicken, for which he invented a modified commercial-grade pressure cooker. He founded the Broaster Company in 1954 to manufacture and market the machines.
