= PappaRich =

Malaysian style chain restaurant

- Formation: 2006; 20 years ago
- Founder: Rich Tan
- CEO: Sebastian Low

PappaRich is a Malaysian multinational restaurant chain that sells Malaysian cuisine. It was established in 2006, and has since expanded to other countries.

== History ==
PappaRich was established in 2006 at Selayang Mall in Malaysia by entrepreneur Rich Tan. In 2012, PappaRich Asia Pacific CEO Sebastian Low expanded PappaRich to Singapore.

In 2017, PappaRich was reported to be considering an initial public offering in Singapore to expand its operations in the country. By that point, it had about 100 outlets globally and had expanded its operations to other countries, including Australia, New Zealand, the United States, Taiwan, South Korea, China and Brunei. That October, PappaRich had reportedly put its IPO plan on hold due to "challenging business conditions".

In 2019, Rich sold his shares in PappaRich. In May 2020, winding-up petitions were filed against PappaRich in the High Court of Malaya by Chen Khai Voon and Agathisfour. According to The Edge, PappaRich had accumulated unpaid debts amounting to RM37.22 million.

In 2023, Pineapple Resources Berhad CEO Andy Lim bought the PappaRich brand in Malaysia and Cambodia. By that year, PappaRich's presence in Malaysia had dwindled. Andy announced a revamp in Malaysia over the next six months following the acquisition, including a sister brand known as PappaRich Lite.

== Products ==
PappaRich sells Malaysian cuisine, including items such as nasi lemak, nasi goreng, laksa noodles and Hainanese chicken rice.

In 2018, PappaRich collaborated with Belles Hot Chicken to create a fried chicken sandwich in Australia. From March to April 2024, PappaRich provided a menu known as the Ramadan Special Set, which offered three rice dishes (chicken curry, beef rendang, asam seafood) and a Western dish.

== International ==
=== Australia ===
PappaRich opened an outlet in Melbourne in 2012. As of 2017, there were 7 PappaRich outlets in Sydney. In March 2025, PappaRich closed its outlet in Wollongong Central after operating there for 12 months.

In 2019, the Fair Work Ombudsman announced it would be taking action against the PappaRich franchise manager in Sydney, alleging he had underpaid 154 workers at three PappaRich eateries by an amount totalling AU$74,000.

=== Hong Kong ===
In February 2016, PappaRich opened its first Hong Kong outlet at the L-Square in Causeway Bay.

=== New Zealand ===
PappaRich opened its first outlet in March 2016 at the Metro building in Aotea Square, Auckland. Managing director Steven Loh said, "We see a huge potential in New Zealand, and will be opening up to seven restaurants in a bid to popularise Malaysian cuisine."

=== Sri Lanka ===
In 2019, PappaRich opened its first outlet in the country. PappaRich opened an outlet in Thalawathugoda in August 2021.

=== Singapore ===
PappaRich operates 4 outlets in Singapore as of August 2026.

=== United States ===
As of 2017, PappaRich had outlets in Flushing, Queens and Bensonhurst, Brooklyn, with an outlet planned to open in Edison, New Jersey at the time.
