= Hot chicken =

Chicken dish from Nashville, Tennessee, US

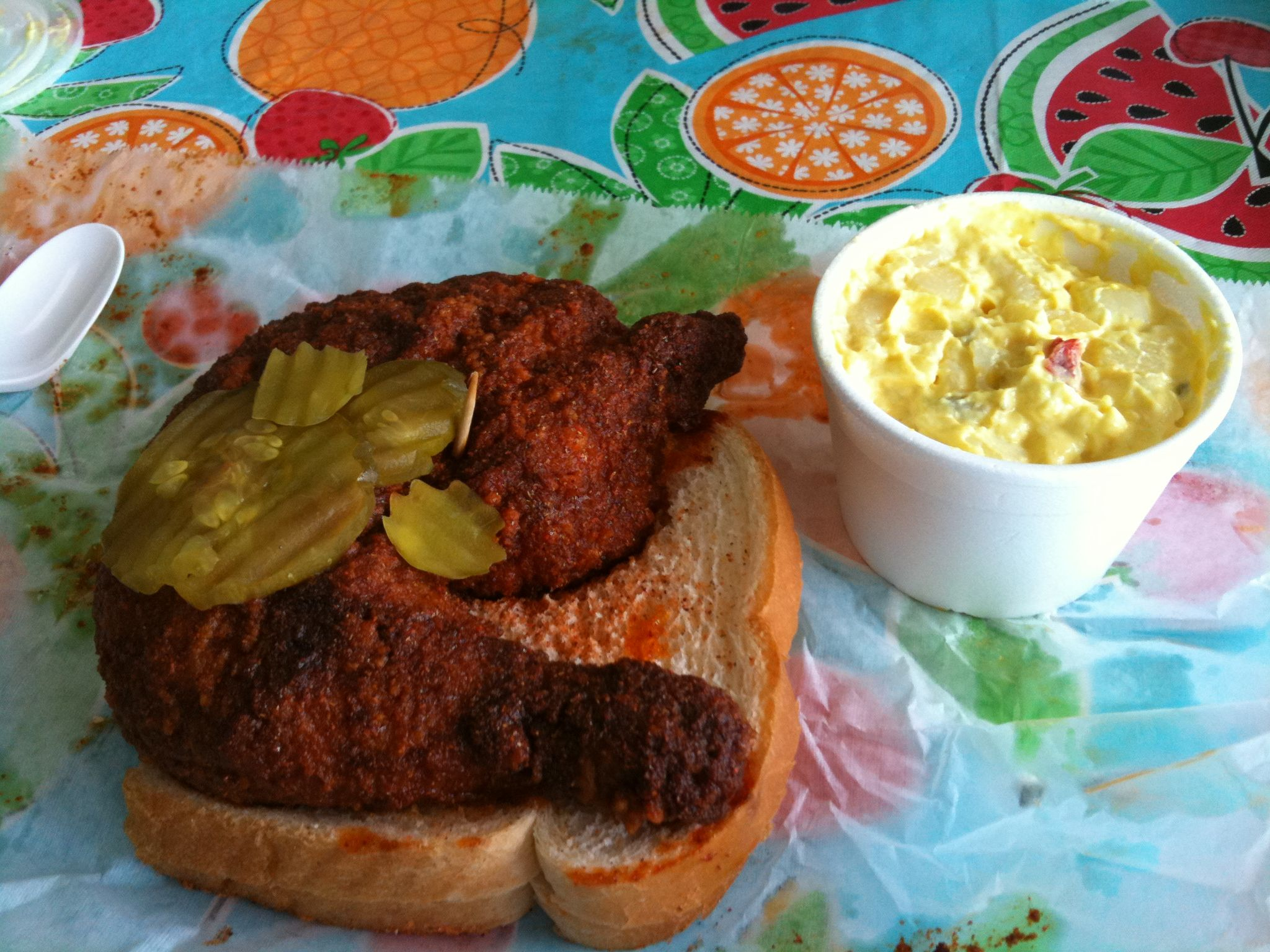
- Prince's hot chicken
- Alternative names: Nashville hot chicken, Prince's chicken, Nashville-style chicken
- Course: Main course
- Place of origin: United States
- Region or state: Nashville, Tennessee
- Created by: Prince family
- Serving temperature: Hot
- Main ingredients: Chicken, cayenne pepper
- Variations: Deep-fried, skillet-fried, hot fish

Hot chicken (or Nashville hot chicken) is a type of fried chicken that is a local specialty of Nashville, Tennessee, in the United States. In its typical preparation, it is a portion of breast, thigh or wing that has been marinated in a water-based blend of seasoning, floured, fried and finally covered in a paste or sauce that has been spiced with cayenne pepper. This method of preparation originates within African American communities in the Southern United States. A richly pigmented seasoning paste gives the fried chicken its reddish hue. Spice blends, preparation methods and heat intensity vary, depending on the recipe and chef.

It is served atop slices of white bread with pickle chips. It is both the application of a spicy paste and the presentation that differentiates it from similar dishes, such as Buffalo wings. It can be viewed in similar context to other foods that have been tweaked to be unique in a regional way, such as the slugburger or the Mississippi Delta tamale.

Many restaurants in Nashville serve a variant of the dish; a citywide festival and competition celebrate it. The popularity of hot chicken has spread beyond the Southern United States due to the influence of Nashville's music industry.

== Preparation ==
Although the components of the dish largely remain the same, the preparation of the dish can differ greatly. A pressure fryer or deep fryer can be used, although most restaurants serve a pan-fried dish. Nearly all hot chicken is marinated in buttermilk to impart flavor and to retain the meat's juices upon frying (sometimes in olive oil). Some preparations of hot chicken are breaded and fried after application of the spice paste; the more traditional method has the paste applied immediately after the chicken is removed from the fryer.

Traditionally Nashville-style hot chicken spice paste had two key ingredients: lard and cayenne pepper. The two are mixed together, three parts pepper to one part lard, and heated until they form a thick sauce. Some restaurants vary the composition of the paste, adding sugar, garlic, or additional hot sauce. The paste is applied to the fried chicken by the server using a spoon and latex gloves; it is lightly squeezed into the finished chicken by hand.

== Variations ==
The main variation to traditional hot chicken is in the application of the spice paste: before breading or after breading, and whether or not additional spices are applied. Recipes, cooking methods, and preparation steps for hot chicken are often closely guarded secrets, proprietary to the specific restaurant, so the appearance of the chicken may vary widely.

=== Hot fish ===
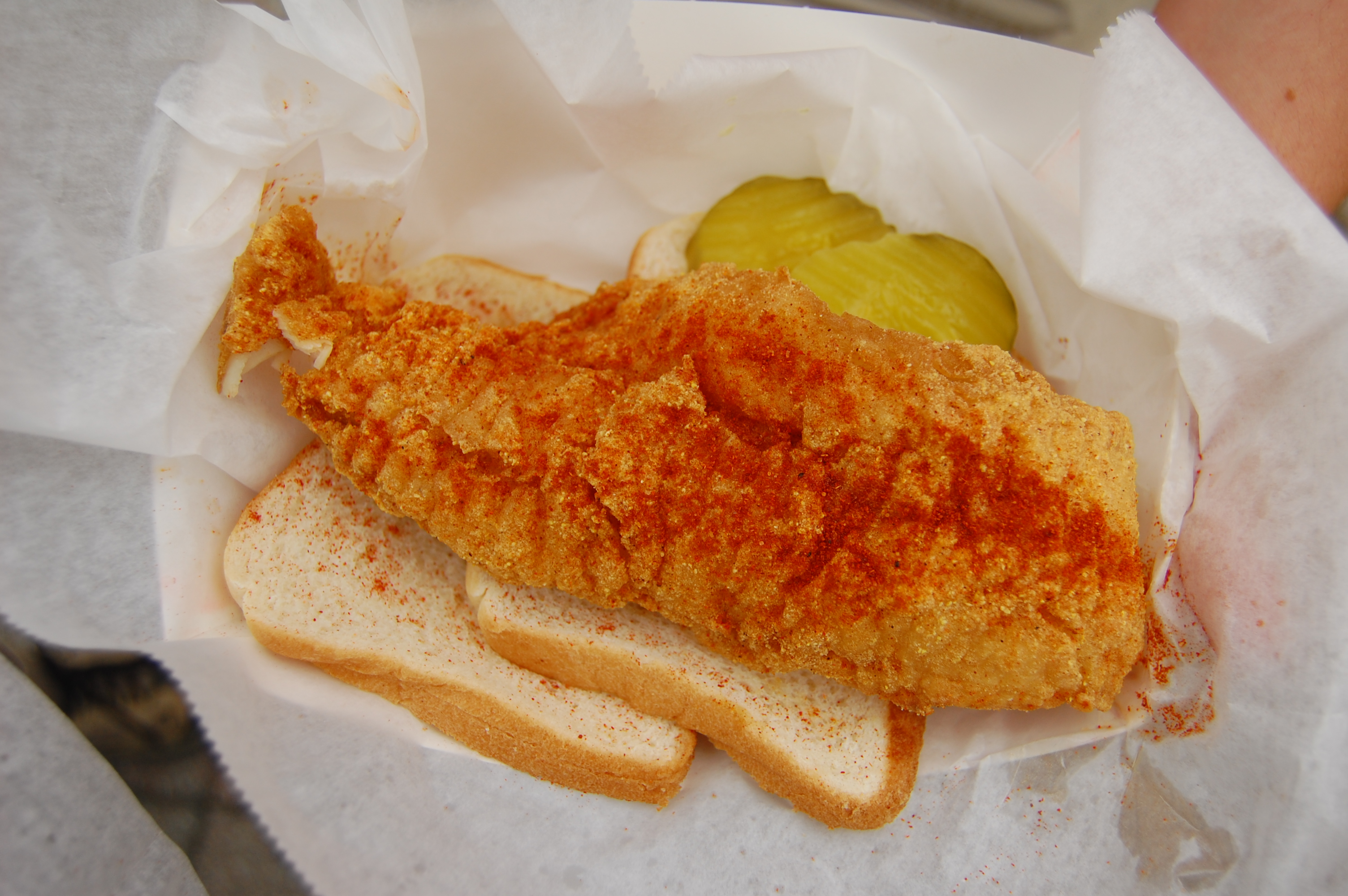
Nashville-style hot fish

A variation of the hot chicken theme is hot fish, typically a breaded and fried whiting or catfish filet prepared using a similar cayenne paste as hot chicken, or using a cayenne powder blend sprinkled liberally over the filet. Some hot chicken restaurants also serve hot fish, but other restaurants may specialize in hot fish alone.

== History ==
Anecdotal evidence suggests that spicy fried chicken has been served in Nashville's African-American communities for generations. The dish may have been introduced as early as the 1930s; however, the current style of spice paste may only date back to the mid-1970s. It is generally accepted that the originator of hot chicken is the family of André Prince Jeffries, owner of Prince's Hot Chicken Shack. She has operated the restaurant since 1980; before that time, it was owned by her great-uncle, Thornton Prince III. Jeffries says the development of hot chicken was an accident. Her great-uncle Thornton was purportedly a womanizer, and after a particularly late Saturday night out, his girlfriend at the time cooked him a fried chicken breakfast with extra pepper as revenge. Instead, Thornton decided he liked it so much that, by the mid-1930s, he and his brothers had created their own recipe and opened the BBQ Chicken Shack café.

As of 2015, there are an estimated two dozen restaurants in the Nashville area that serve hot chicken, either as the focus or as part of a larger menu. Between 2001 and about 2006, country music stars Lorrie Morgan and Sammy Kershaw owned and operated a now-defunct hot chicken restaurant called "hotchickens.com". Former mayor of Nashville Bill Purcell is a devoted fan, sponsoring the Music City Hot Chicken Festival and giving numerous interviews touting the dish. While in office, he frequently referred to his table at Prince's Hot Chicken as his "second office".

Reflecting the growing popularity of the dish, many cities in the United States host restaurants that serve hot chicken or a variation thereof, including Atlanta, New York City, Philadelphia, Chicago, Los Angeles, Birmingham, Louisville, Ann Arbor, Columbus, Salt Lake City, and Seattle. Hot chicken restaurant chains have also begun to appear. The appeal of hot chicken has spread beyond the United States, with restaurants in Calgary, Alberta, Seoul, South Korea, and Melbourne, Australia also serving this style of chicken.

In January 2016, fast food chain KFC began selling "Nashville Hot Chicken" and "Nashville Hot Tenders" in its U.S. restaurants. This followed a trial run in the Pittsburgh area that it stated was "the most successful product testing in the company's recent history." Following this, KFC released "Nashville Hot Chicken" in its UK restaurants for a limited run between May 22 and June 18, 2017. Other established chains, such as Buffalo Wild Wings, offer Nashville hot-chicken-style wings.

Notable restaurant chains specializing in hot chicken include Angry Chickz, Dave's Hot Chicken, Hattie B's Hot Chicken, Howlin' Ray's, Joella's Hot Chicken and World Famous Hotboys. Additionally, there are local restaurants around the world that specialize in hot chicken, such as Burnin Bird in Calgary.

== See also ==
- List of chicken dishes
- List of regional dishes of the United States
