= Chicken Express =

Regional fast food restaurant chain in the Southern United States

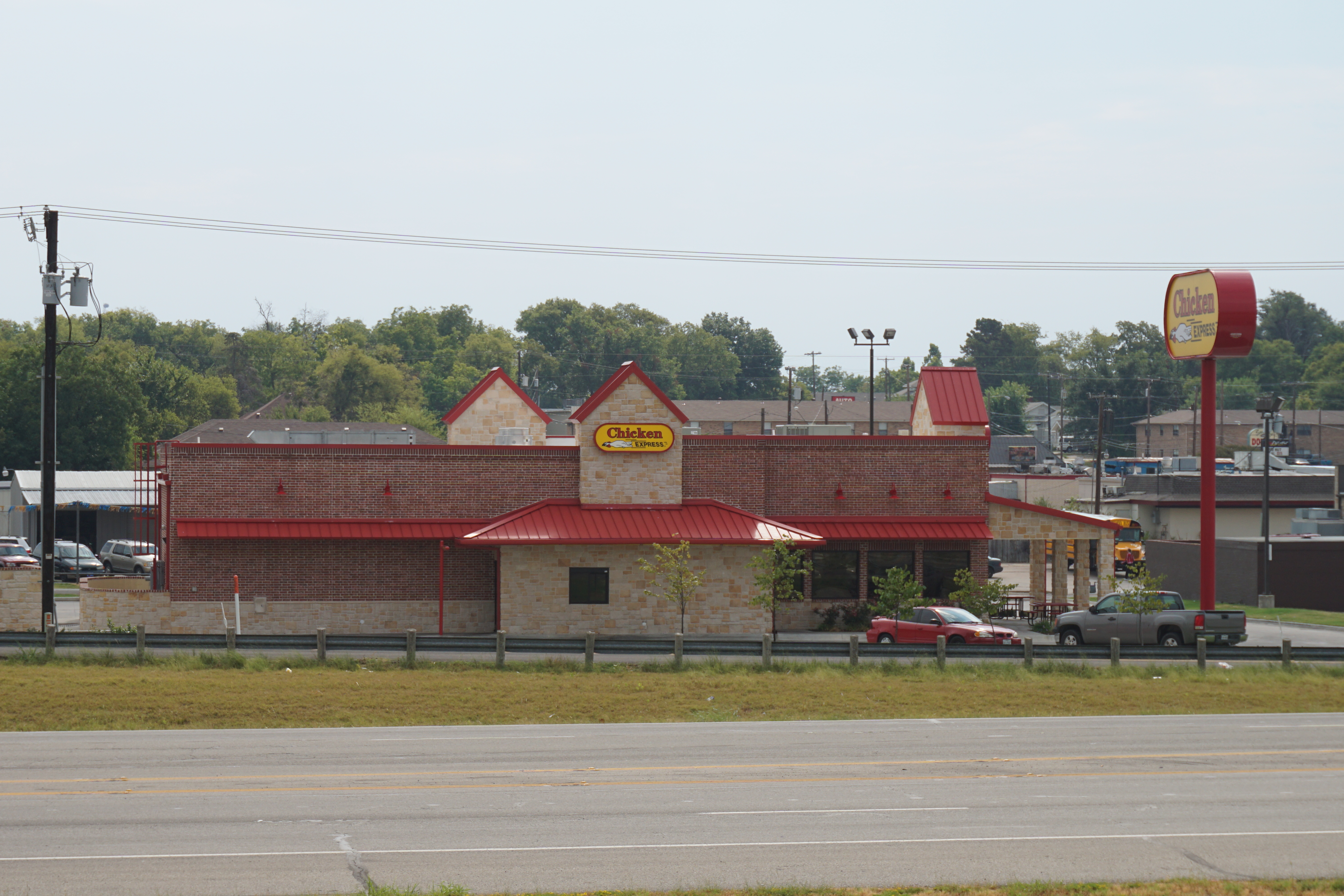
- Chicken Express location in Commerce, Texas
- Industry: Fast Food Franchising
- Founded: 1988; 38 years ago, in Benbrook, Texas, United States
- Founders: Richard Stuart; Nancy Stuart
- Headquarters: Burleson, Texas, U.S.
- Number of locations: 200+
- Key people: Richard Stuart, Nancy Stuart, Founders Abby Ring
- Products: Fried Chicken, Chicken Tenders, and other sides.
- Parent: Stuart Group, Inc.
- Website: chickene.com

Chicken Express is a regional chain of fast food restaurants concentrated mainly in Texas and other states in the Southern United States.

== History ==
Chicken Express was established in 1988 by Richard and Nancy Stuart's Stuart Group Inc. The first restaurant opened in March 1988 in Benbrook, Texas.

== Present day ==
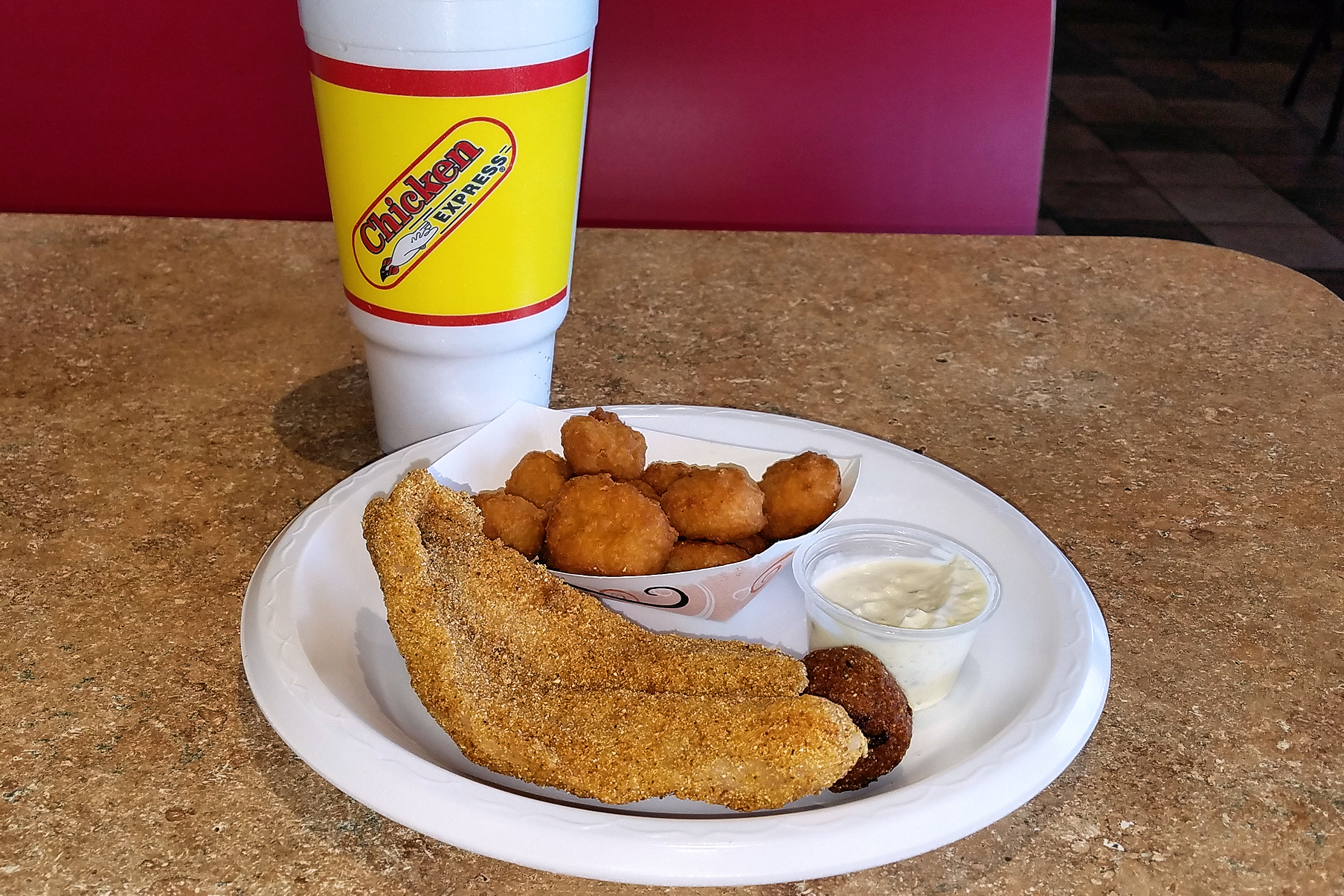
Chicken Express fried catfish snack

The restaurant serves fried chicken, catfish, chicken tenders, and side dishes. The chain is also known for their iced tea, which they sell by the gallon. Chicken Express is headquartered in Burleson, Texas and has over 200 locations in Texas, Arkansas, Louisiana and Oklahoma.

== See also ==
- List of fast-food chicken restaurants
