= Taylor Company =

American food service equipment manufacturer

- Formerly: Taylor Freezer Corporation
- Industry: Retail food processing equipment manufacturing
- Founded: 1926; 100 years ago
- Headquarters: Rockton, Illinois
- Parent: Middleby
- Website: taylor-company.com

Taylor Company, previously known as Taylor Freezer Corporation, is an American manufacturer of food service equipment located in Rockton, Illinois. They are known as the supplier and maker of several machines that McDonald's uses, including their grills and many of their ice cream machines. Although known for soft serve machines, the company also offers commercial grills, frozen and carbonated beverage units, frozen cocktail machines, batch freezers, smoothie equipment, and shake equipment.

== History ==
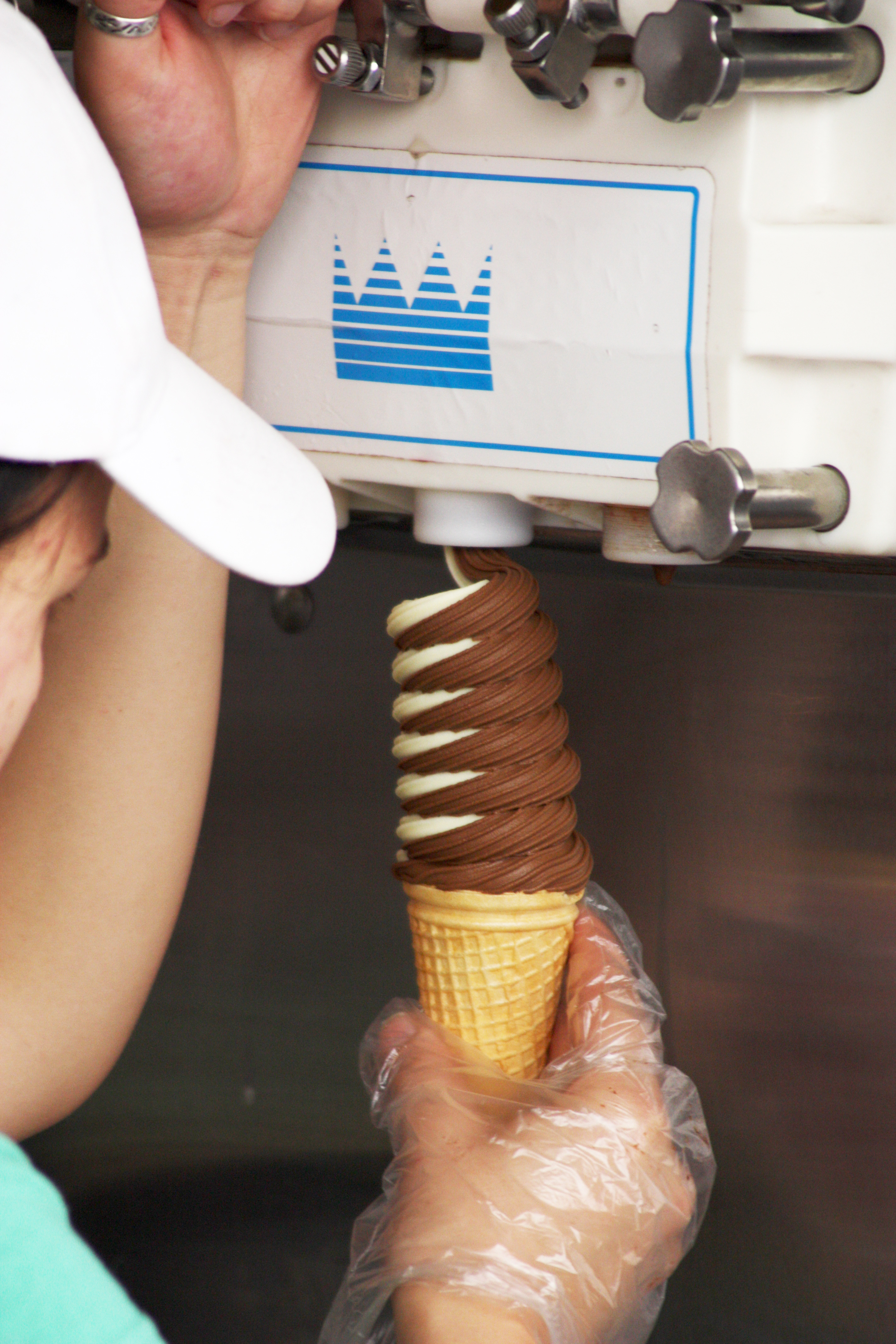
A mixture of chocolate and vanilla soft serve being dispensed, a flavor colloquially referred to as swirl or twist

The company was founded in 1926 by Charles Taylor, a third-generation ice cream maker from Buffalo, New York, who invented an automated countertop ice cream freezer that allowed restaurants to manufacture their own ice cream from mix. The machine stores liquid ingredients in a hopper and freezes them in another chamber. Blades scrape the frozen product off the walls and send it to a nozzle. Taylor's invention has been reported as the first soft serve ice cream machine. Inventor L.A.M. Phelan became the company's president in 1928. From 1945 to 1955, Taylor Freezer Corp. franchised the Zesto Drive-In restaurant concept, which was centered around the "Zest-O-Mat" frozen custard machine that Phelan developed and Taylor sold. In 1945, Phelan organized Tekni-Craft, a pioneering worker cooperative that operated Taylor's manufacturing facilities.

In 1956, the company made a handshake agreement with Ray Kroc of McDonald's Corporation to supply milkshake machines for the fast food chain.

The company was acquired by Beatrice Foods in 1967. In 1985, the company was sold to Specialty Equipment Companies along with other former Beatrice operations. Specialty Equipment Companies was purchased by United Technologies in 2000 and merged into its Carrier unit. Middleby Corporation of Elgin, Illinois, acquired Taylor from United Technologies' UTC Climate, Controls & Security division in 2018 in a deal valued at $1 billion.

Equipment is not sold directly from the manufacturing location, but the company operates using a distribution system model with distributors based around the world. The company has a support network for installation and maintenance of their machines.

== Ice cream machines produced for McDonald's ==
As of 2021, the Taylor C602 ice cream machine is found in more than 13,000 McDonald's locations in the United States and many more around the world. These Taylor ice cream machines can make milkshakes, soft serve ice cream, sundaes, and the McFlurry dessert; rather than use gravity, they actively pump the ice cream material through it, allowing far higher throughput and production than "standard" ice cream machines.
