= Henny Penny (manufacturer) =

American manufacturer

Henny Penny Corporation
- Company type: Private/Employee Owned
- Industry: Foodservice equipment
- Founded: 1957
- Founder: Chester Wagner
- Headquarters: Eaton, Ohio, United States
- Area served: Worldwide
- Key people: Jack Cobb (Owner, President & CEO, 1975–1998); Steve Cobb (Owner, 1998–2015); Rob Connelly (CEO (2014-Present) & Chairman of the Board (2020-Present); Steve Maggard (President, 2020-2024); Brian Silverberg (President, 2024-Present)
- Products: Pressure fryers; Deep fryers; Holding cabinets; Combi steamers; Breading
- Number of employees: 1000+ (worldwide, 2023)
- Website: www.hennypenny.com

Henny Penny Corporation is an American manufacturer of premium commercial grade food equipment based in Eaton, Ohio. The company was founded in 1957 and currently employs over 1,000 people. Clients include KFC, Wendy's, McDonald's, Chick-fil-A and Chicken Licken. The company became employee-owned in 2015.

== Products ==
=== Evolution Elite Open Fryer ===
In 2009, Henny Penny introduced a reduced-oil capacity technology with the Evolution Elite Open Fryer, a deep fat fryer using 30 lbs. of frying oil in the vat instead of the previous 50 lbs.

=== Velocity Series Pressure Fryer ===
Launched in 2017, Henny Penny introduced a new reduced-oil pressure fryer called the Velocity (along with an open fryer variant). This cooker model featured 8-head capacity for chicken frying, automatic oil replenishment and a similar automatic oil filtration system to the Evolution Elite. It uses 25% less oil than competitive cookers and uses either electric heating or gas heating.

=== F5 Open Fryer ===
In 2023, Henny Penny released an updated reduced-oil capacity fryer called the F5 Fryer. The F5 features intuitive touchscreen controls that significantly reduces training time for users. The F5's quick filtering cycle is only 3 minutes long, which is faster than any other commercial fryer can filter.

== Awards ==
Henny Penny has received several awards from industry associations and customers.

=== KFC ===
- KFC 2010 U.S. Equipment Supplier of the Year
- KFC 2011 U.S. Equipment Supplier of the Year
- KFC 2011 U.S. Supplier of the Year
- KFC 2012 U.S. Equipment Supplier of the Year

=== McDonald's ===
- McDonald's 2008 Innovation Award
- McDonald's 2009 Global Equipment Supplier of the Year
- McDonald's 2010 Global Equipment Partner of the Year
