= Belles Hot Chicken =

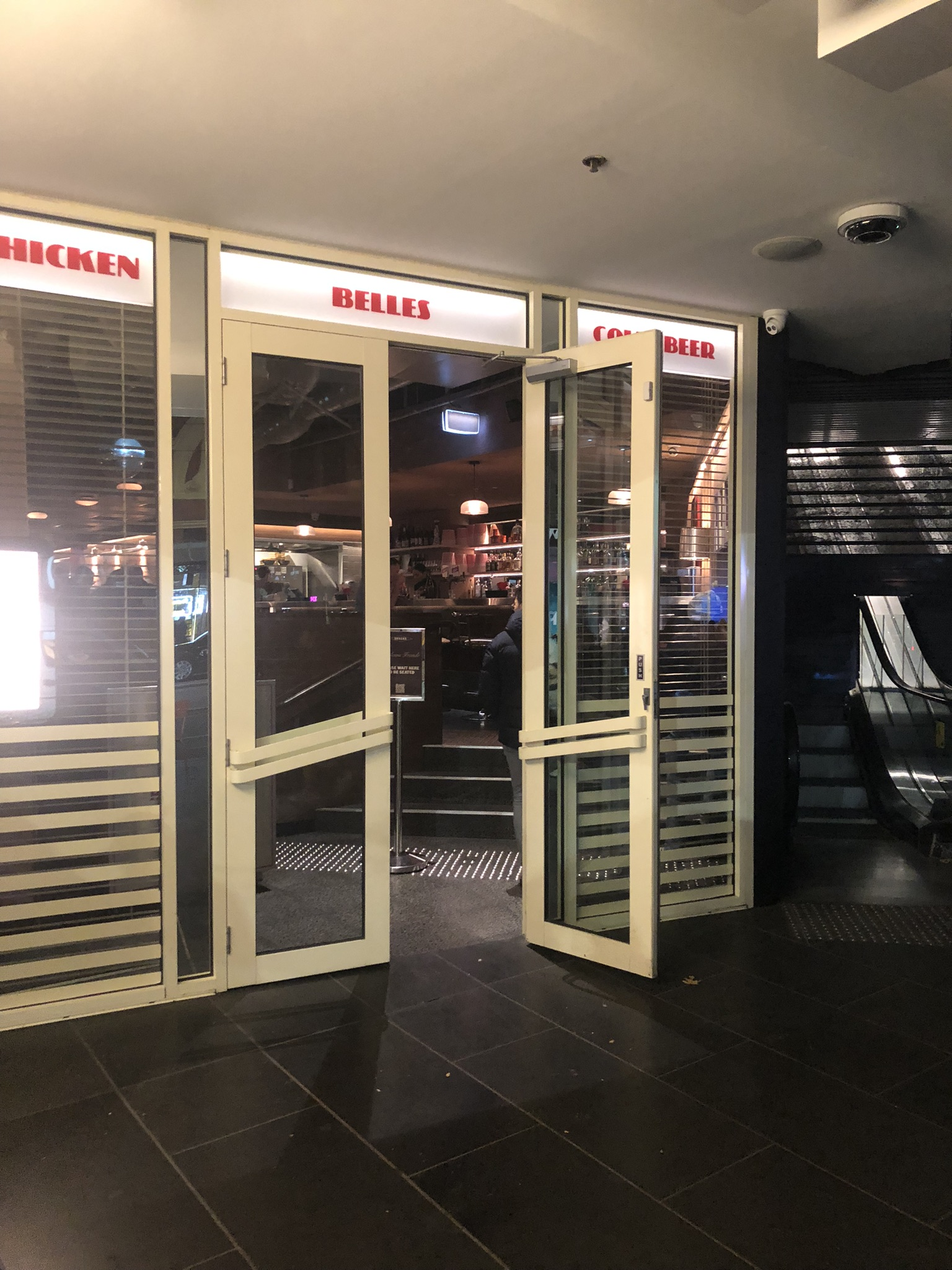

Restaurant information
- Established: 2014
- Owner: Joss Jenner-Leuthart
- Previous owner: Morgan McGlone
- Food type: Southern Diner
- Location: 150 Gertrude St, Fitzroy VIC 3065
- Other locations: five other locations
- Website: https://belleshotchicken.com/

Belles Hot Chicken, aka Belles', is a chain restaurant in Australia that serves southern-style fried chicken.

== History ==
The chain was founded by Miranda Campbell, Reno Pontonio and Morgan McGlone, a former model minder for Lily Cole who later trained as a chef. McGlone became interested in fried chicken after living in Nashville, Tennessee. After returning to Australia he partnered with Miranda Campbell who took over a store on Gertrude St Melbourne's suburb of Fitzroy under the name 'Belle's Diner'; and rebranded it as 'Belles Hot Chicken'. Under its previous ownership the store had focused on American food but was not well received.

After taking over and rebranding the store in 2014, the new owners refocused its menu. Following these changes the store received a positive review in The Age. The store then began to grow a cult following for its combination of serving spicy-fried chicken and natural wine.

The next year the pair expanded the chain to a pop-up location in Barangaroo, NSW, and in 2016 the location was made permanent. In 2018, Belles Hot Chicken collaborated with Malaysian restaurant chain PappaRich to create a fried chicken sandwich.

At some point in the years after the chain's establishment, Jenner-Leuthart bought out McGlone's stake in the franchise. After its NSW pop-ups, the franchise looked to open a flagship location in that state, eventually settling on its location at Circular Quay. In June 2024, it opened a store in the Adelaide CBD.

As of March 2025 the store has six actively trading locations: three in Melbourne, two in Sydney, and one in Adelaide. In Melbourne its locations are in Fitzroy, Docklands, and the Melbourne CBD; in Sydney its locations are at Barangaroo and Circular Quay; its Adelaide location is in the CBD.

== Description ==
The hot spice mix of the store is flour based and mostly relies on just smoked paprika and cayenne pepper. The chicken is hormone-free and submerged in brine a day in advance. Plain white bread is served underneath the chicken. Sauces are available including a Belle's branded ranch dressing, as well as a blue-cheese based sauce. Other dishes served include mac and cheese, potato salad, braised-beans in ham hocks, hot fish, and soft-serve ice cream.

Drinks served include beer; Melbourne Bitter, Resch's, Pabst Tallboys, and Kronenbourg; another drink is rye-whisky with pickle juice.

The interior of the restaurant's Gertrude Street store is designed to resemble a Nashville diner, with a big stool-studded bar.

== Reception ==
The chain has generally been well received in Australia, after its first rebranding. It has received positive reviews in The Age, as well as in The Sydney Morning Herald, and the Herald Sun.

In his 2014 review for the Herald Sun, food reviewer Simon Plant gave it a favourable review, writing: "Belle's Hot Chicken is more fun than you can poke a drumstick at. Next best thing to being in Nashville." Simone Egger writing for The Age said: "I went as far as the brick-red coloured "Hot", which slapped me in the face, but had me going back for more". In her review for The Sydney Morning Herald, Myffy Rigby said: "To my mind, you can pretty easily skip the leg meat, which doesn't yield the same level of crunch, juiciness and intensity of flavour as the wings, which you should definitely double order".

== See also ==
- List of restaurant chains in Australia
- List of chicken restaurants
