= Zesto Drive-In =

Chain of American drive-in restaurants

- Zesto Ice Cream Sign in West Columbia, South Carolina.
- Type: Private
- Industry: Food
- Founded: 1945; 81 years ago
- Products: Fast food, including hamburgers, french fries, ice cream, banana splits, and homemade/ hand blended milkshakes

Zesto is a licensed trademark owned by TJ Group Investments, LLC and currently used by a significant amount of independently owned restaurants and independent franchise chains who sublicense the trademark to franchise owners. Until 1955, Zesto Drive-In was a chain of drive-in restaurants franchised by Taylor Freezer Corp. (now the Taylor Company), featuring ice cream and frozen custard. They are recognized for their ice cream favorites such as avalanches, milkshakes, sundaes and ice cream sodas, to name a few.

== History ==
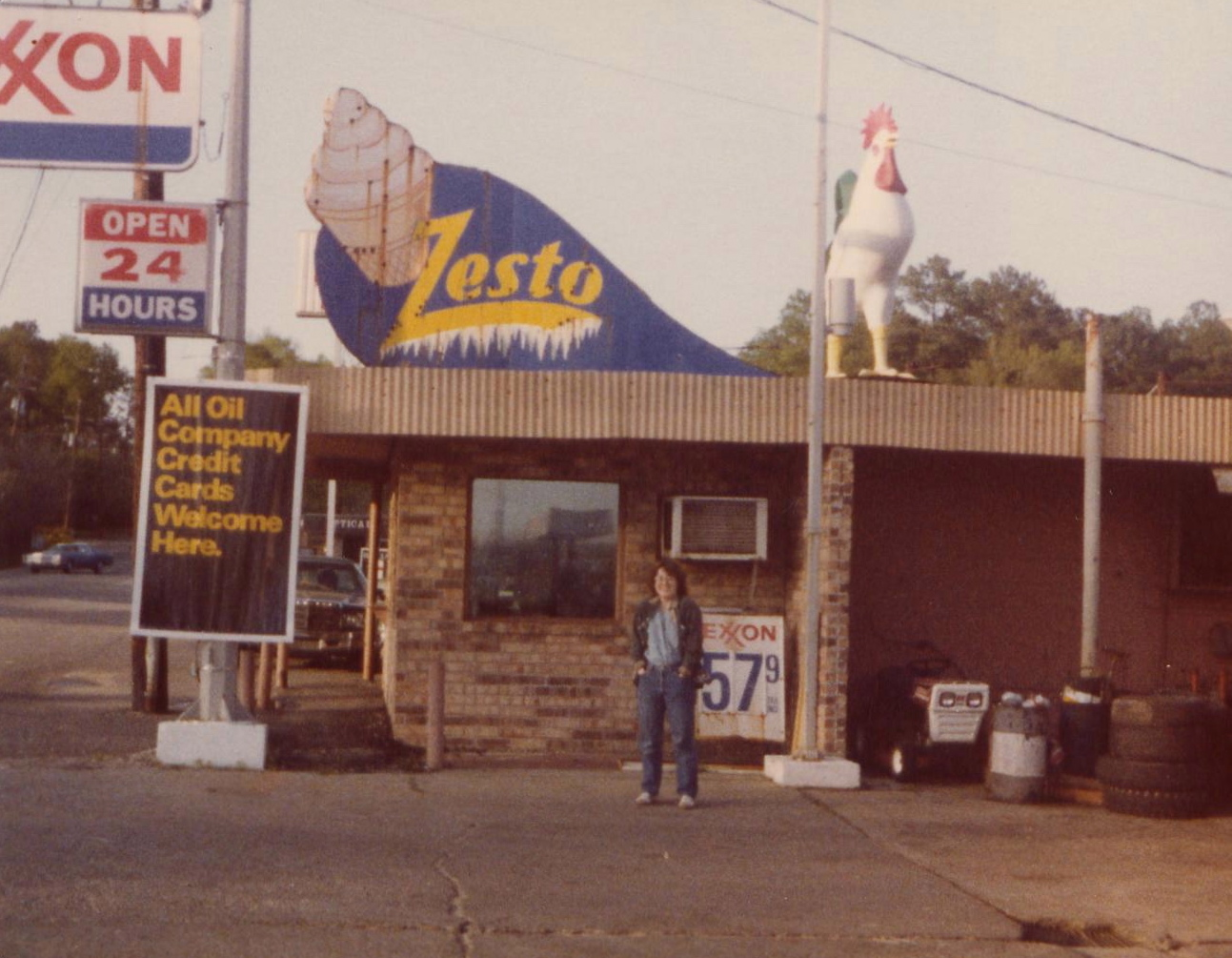
Zesto in Bogalusa, Louisiana, 1983

Zesto was started by entrepreneur and inventor L.A.M. Phelan as a national franchise chain. Phelan was head of the Taylor Freezer Corp., which in 1945 had developed the "Zest-O-Mat" frozen custard machine, and franchise agreements granted exclusive use of the Zest-O-Mat machines in a given territory under the Zesto name. The first known Zesto Drive-In was opened in Jefferson City, Missouri, in 1948 at the foot of St. Mary's Hospital on Missouri Boulevard by its original franchise owner, Lottie Traubtz; dozens more opened in the late 1940s and early 1950s, mostly in the Midwestern states.

Taylor Freezer, reportedly growing frustrated with managing a retail business and dealing with unhappy franchisees, abandoned the Zesto concept in 1955 and left the remaining franchisees to fend for themselves. While some former franchisees continued to operate under different names, others retained the Zesto name, operating independently of each other and without support from a governing franchise structure.

The Zesto trademark was first registered in 1985 by Zesto Inc., a Missouri corporation owned by Harold Brown, who purchased and operated the first known Zesto in Jefferson City, Missouri in 1973. The trademark currently belongs to Todd B. Jansa of TJ Group Investments LLC located in Wahoo, Nebraska, who grants exclusive rights to use the Zesto name by territory.

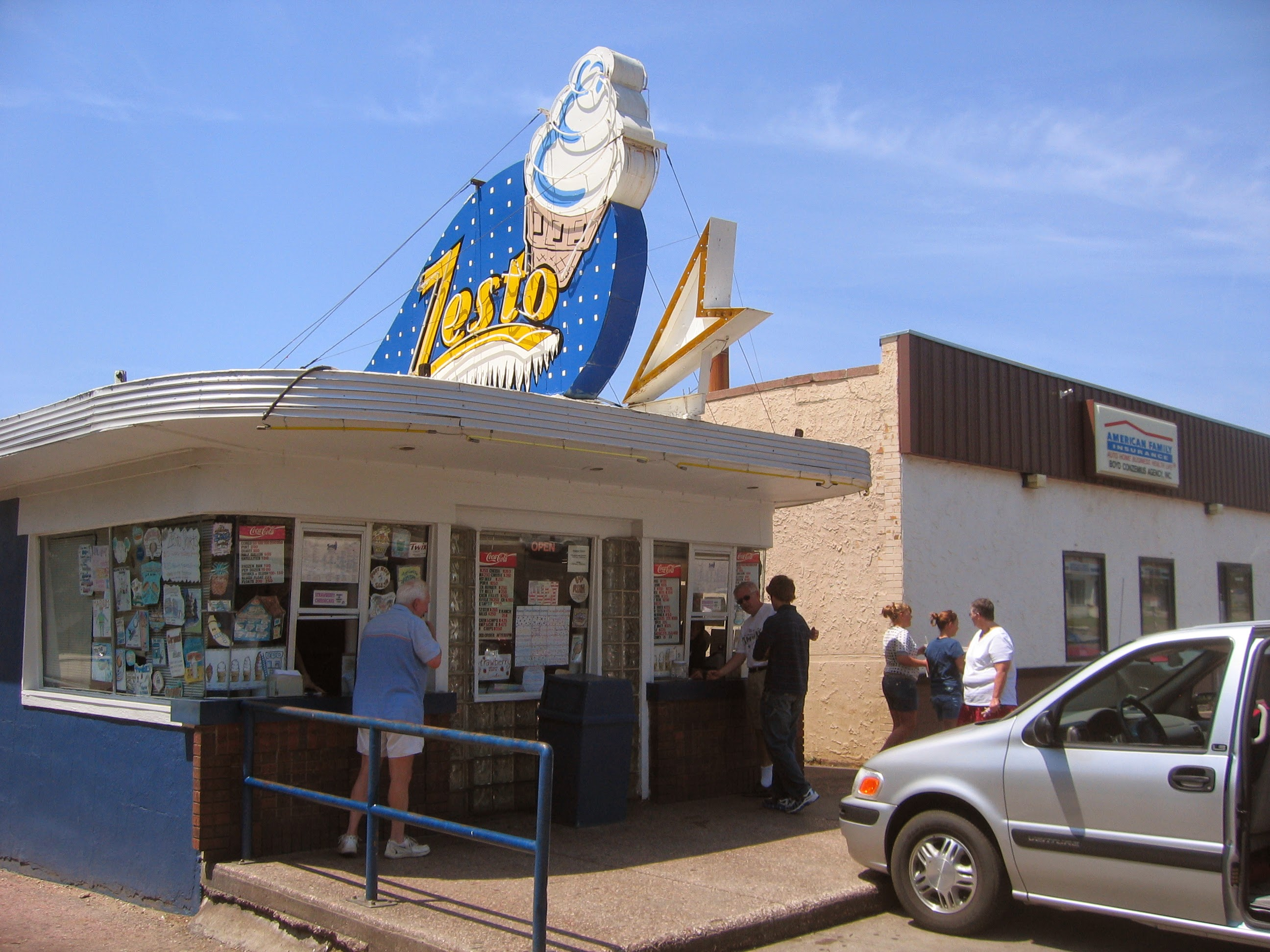
Zesto in Pierre, South Dakota, 2007

== Current locations ==
- Atlanta, Georgia
- Alliance, Nebraska
- Angola, Indiana
- Bluffton, Indiana
- Bogalusa, Louisiana
- Brookings, South Dakota
- Chapin, South Carolina On May 2, 2024. this location announced on Facebook that it would permanently close after lunch service on May 3.
- Clarksville, Indiana
- Columbia, South Carolina
- Decatur, Indiana
- Evansville, Indiana
- Fort Wayne, Indiana
- Fremont, Nebraska
- Huntington, Indiana
- Lincoln, Nebraska
- Mitchell, South Dakota
- New Albany, Indiana
- New Haven, Indiana
- Newberry, South Carolina
- Omaha, Nebraska
- Pierre, South Dakota
- Watertown, South Dakota
- West Columbia, South Carolina

== See also ==
- List of frozen custard companies
- List of hamburger restaurants
