= Krispy Krunchy Chicken =

American fast food chain

- Type: Private
- Industry: Fried chicken restaurant
- Founded: 1989; 37 years ago in Lafayette, Louisiana
- Founder: Neal Onebane
- Headquarters: Atlanta, Georgia
- Number of locations: 3,500+ (2025)
- Area served: United States
- Website: https://www.krispykrunchy.com/

Krispy Krunchy Foods LLC, also known as Krispy Krunchy Chicken or KKC, is an American quick-service food concept specializing in Cajun-style fried chicken. The brand is known for operating in convenience stores, travel centers, stadiums, and other retail settings via a store-in-store or co-location model. Originally founded in 1989 in Lafayette, Louisiana, the brand currently has over 3,500 locations across 48 states in the U.S.

== History ==
The store-in-store concept allows licensees to serve hand-breaded, mildly Cajun-spiced fried chicken and all white meat jumbo tenders to its guests, to increase their in-store profitability and drive frequency. The full menu also includes, wings, chicken nuggets, the award-winning Krispy Krunchy Chicken sandwich, honey butter fried shrimp, and family meals. Guests can round out their order with a variety of Cajun-inspired sides such as fries, mashed potatoes & gravy, red beans & rice, mac-n-cheese, jambalaya, and the brand’s trademark honey biscuits.

With convenience store businessman Dan Shapiro as Krispy Krunchy Chicken's executive vice president and owner, Krispy Krunchy Chicken products increased from being carried in 200 convenience stores to over 2,200 in 2006. Sales were $12.6 million that year.

In 2024, Krispy Krunchy Chicken opened more than 600 locations, this eclipses the brand’s previous record of 481 set in 2023, and it is now in more than 3,500 retail locations.

In 2025, Krispy Krunchy Chicken became the Official Fried Chicken of the Boston Red Sox and the New England Patriots.

== Business Model Operations ==
KKC operates under a licensing model rather than a traditional franchise. Participating operators integrate KKC’s equipment, food supply, graphics, and systems into their retail sites.

Operators of Krispy Krunchy Chicken locations do not pay franchise or royalty fees. Instead, operators pay Krispy Krunchy Chicken to distribute inventory (equipment and graphics) to their stores.

Krispy Krunchy emphasizes ease of operation, consistent supply chain support, and marketing, with the aim of increasing store-level profitability.

== Menu ==
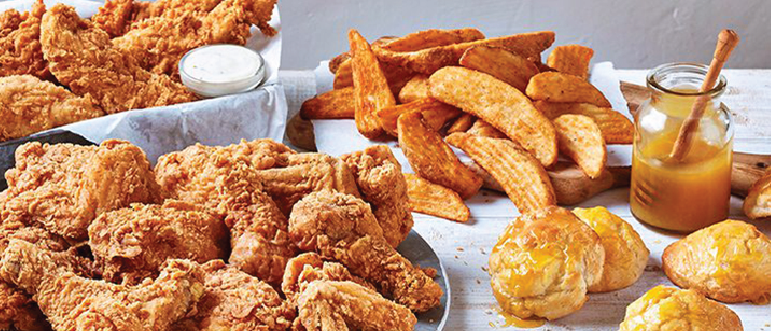
Krispy Krunchy Chicken tenders, bone-in pieces, fries, and honey biscuits

Krispy Krunchy Chicken offers Cajun-style chicken, chicken tenders, chicken nuggets, and wings. The chicken is marinated and coated in Cajun-seasoned breading.

Other menu items include biscuits, red beans and rice, macaroni & cheese, mashed potatoes & gravy, jambalaya, and boudin bites.

In 2023, the brand introduced a Cajun chicken sandwich topped with honey sauce and pickles on a brioche-style bun.

In 2025, the brand introduced all-white meat chicken nuggets in its restaurants.

== Sauces ==
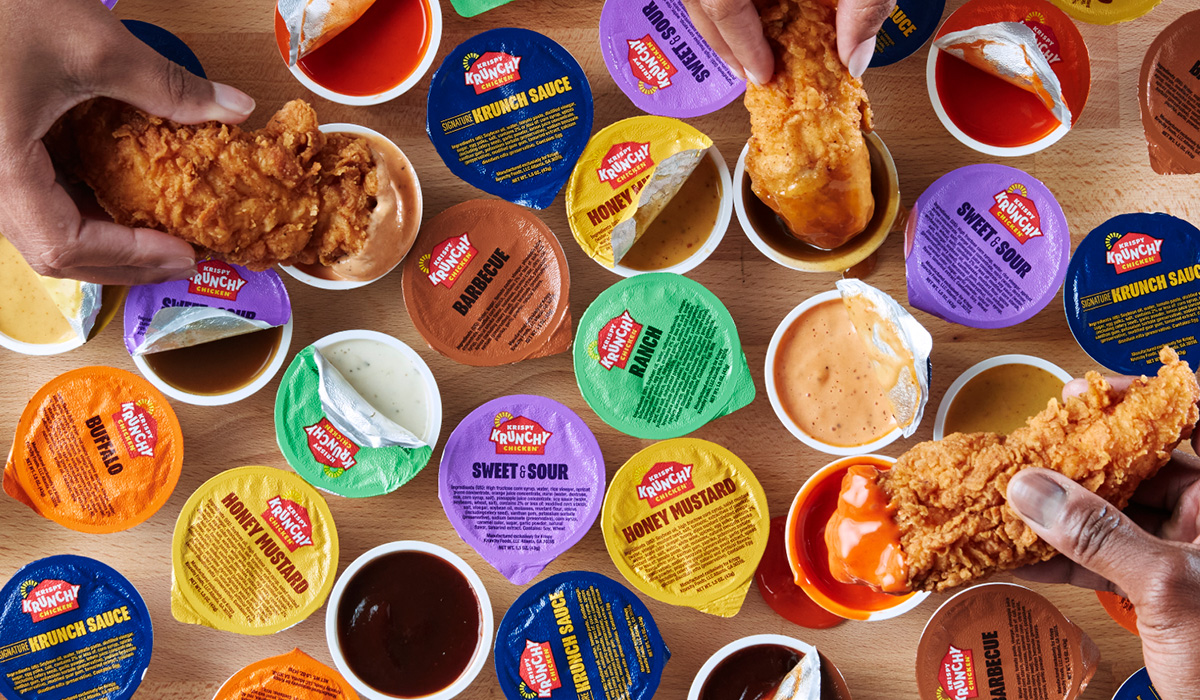
Krispy Krunchy Chicken’s New Dipping Sauces

In mid-2025, the company introduced a changed dipping sauce lineup, with redesigned packaging, increased serving size (from 1 ounce to 1.5 ounces), and the addition of buttermilk ranch.

The full sauce lineup comprises~~:~~

- Signature Krunch Sauce: A version of comeback sauce
- Ranch
- Buffalo
- Honey Mustard
- Barbeque
- Sweet & Sour

== See also ==
- List of fast-food chicken restaurants
- List of fast food restaurant chains
