= Pressure frying =

Variation on pressure cooking

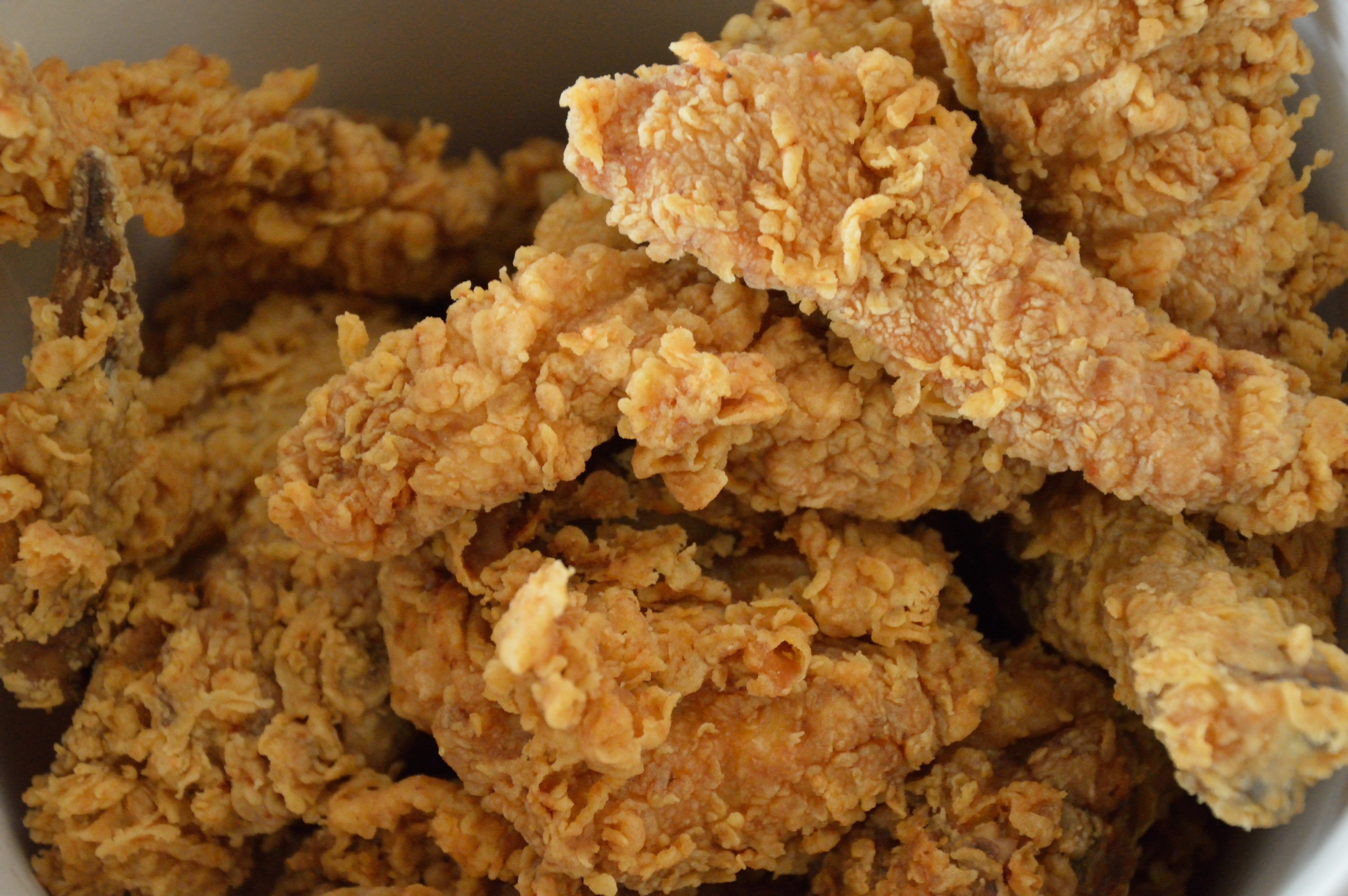
KFC pressure-fried chicken

In cooking, pressure frying is a variation on pressure cooking where meat and cooking oil are brought to high temperatures while pressure is held high enough to cook the food more quickly. This leaves the meat very hot and juicy. A receptacle used in pressure frying is known as a pressure fryer. The process is most notable for its use in the preparation of fried chicken in many commercial fried chicken restaurants.

== Details ==
Pressure frying is mostly done in industrial kitchens. Ordinary home pressure cookers are generally unsuitable for pressure frying, because they are typically designed for a maximum temperature around 121 °C (250 °F) whereas oil can reach temperatures well in excess of 160 °C (320 °F) which may damage the gasket in an ordinary pressure cooker, causing it to fail. Second-generation cookers are somewhat safer, but can still be dangerous if proper precautions, like obeying fill limits, are not taken.

== See also ==
- Broasting
- Henny Penny (manufacturer)
