= World Famous Hotboys =

American fast casual restaurant chain

- Hotboys logo
- Type: Private
- Industry: Restaurant
- Genre: Fast casual
- Founded: 2017; 9 years ago Oakland, California
- Founders: Victor Ghaben; Wallace Berkley Gibbs
- Headquarters: Oakland, California, United States
- Number of locations: 7 (as of 2026)
- Area served: California, Indiana
- Products: Hot chicken; Fried chicken sandwiches; French fries; Macaroni and cheese; Coleslaw
- Website: worldfamoushotboys.com

World Famous Hotboys (stylized as HOTBOYS) is an American fast casual restaurant chain specializing in Nashville-style hot chicken sandwiches and Southern-inspired sides. Founded in 2017 by Victor Ghaben and Wallace Berkley Gibbs in Oakland, California, the restaurant began as a backyard pop-up before expanding to multiple brick-and-mortar locations across California and Indiana. The restaurant serves 100% halal chicken and was ranked the #1 chicken sandwich in California by Yelp's official blog in 2021. By February 2023, the chain had sold over one million chicken sandwiches since its 2019 opening.

== History ==
Victor Ghaben and Wallace Berkley Gibbs, known as "Berk," are longtime friends who first met in Boulder, Colorado in 2009. Gibbs attended college in Nashville, where he discovered the city's hot chicken tradition; in 2015, he introduced Ghaben to the concept while both were working at Batch & Brine, a New American restaurant in Lafayette, California owned by Ghaben's family. Ghaben comes from a multigenerational family of East Bay restaurateurs active in the region since the 1970s.

The pair hosted their first backyard pop-up in Oakland in 2017, then ran a series of sold-out events through Forage Kitchen, an Oakland culinary incubator. In December 2019, with the help of Ghaben's cousin they opened their first brick-and-mortar location on San Pablo Avenue in Uptown, Oakland.

=== Expansion ===
The restaurant expanded to Sacramento in 2020, followed by a Walnut Creek location in early 2022 at the site of a former Mel's Diner. Additional California locations opened in Hayward and Novato. In 2021, the brand also launched the "Foo Truck," a food truck used for pop-up events outside California, including block parties in Denver, Colorado.

The chain's first out-of-state location opened in May 2021 in the Fountain Square neighborhood of Indianapolis, at the former site of the Peppy Grill. A second Indiana location followed in the Carmel Arts District.

== Food ==
World Famous Hotboys describes its cuisine as "Oakland hot chicken," a California-influenced take on traditional Nashville hot chicken. The restaurant uses halal chicken that is brined overnight, fried to order, and seasoned with a proprietary spice blend sourced in part from Oaktown Spice Shop, a local Oakland purveyor.

=== Signature items ===
The restaurant's signature item is the Sando, a fried chicken sandwich made with a jumbo chicken thigh that is hand-trimmed, breaded, and spiced to the customer's preference, served on a Martin's Potato Roll with coleslaw, pickles, and the house-made "Money Sauce."

Chicken is available in seven spice levels: Southern (no spice), Training Wheels, Mild, Mild+ (spicy), Medium (very spicy), Medium+ (extremely spicy), and Hot (extremely spicy).

Other menu items include:

- Loaded Fries — crinkle-cut fries topped with fried chicken, coleslaw, Money Sauce, and pickles
- Pimento Mac and Cheese — macaroni and cheese made with pimento cheese
- Bonuts — fried biscuit doughnuts dusted with cinnamon sugar
- Tenders, wings, and various Southern-inspired sides

== Locations ==
Location	Address	Year opened
Oakland (flagship)	1601 San Pablo Ave	2019
Sacramento	1115 21st St	2020
Walnut Creek	1394 N Main St	2022
Hayward	27826 Mission Blvd	—
Novato	5800 Nave Dr, Ste D	—
Indianapolis, Indiana	1004 Virginia Ave	2021
Carmel, Indiana	4335 W 106th St SUITE 1300	—

== Recognition ==
In September 2021, the Yelp Official Blog published its "Top 50 Fried Chicken Sandwiches in California" list, ranking World Famous Hotboys at #1 in the state. The ranking was determined by the total volume and ratings of customer reviews mentioning fried chicken sandwiches.

In February 2023, Forbes profiled the restaurant's milestone of selling one million Nashville hot chicken sandwiches since the 2019 opening of its first brick-and-mortar location.

The review platform The Infatuation awarded the Oakland location its "Truly Excellent" rating (8 out of 10), its second-highest tier, describing it as a destination worth crossing town for.

Eater SF included the restaurant in its list of the 12 best fried chicken sandwiches in the Bay Area.

In 2025, the Sacramento location received a "Recommended" designation from Restaurant Guru.

The restaurant has been featured in the San Francisco Chronicle, Forbes, East Bay Times, Eater SF, Dope Era Magazine, 303 Magazine, Sacramento Business Journal, Walnut Creek Magazine, Fox 40 and WRTV Indianapolis.

== Culture and branding ==
The visual identity and interior design of World Famous Hotboys is largely the work of co-founder Gibbs, a visual artist and former figure in Denver's electronic music scene. The restaurants feature a distinctive aesthetic described by Eater SF as "post-internet," incorporating graffiti murals, bright primary colors, vintage collectibles, and retro arcade games including Super Mario Bros. cabinets.

The brand draws on the founders' backgrounds in skateboarding culture, hip hop, and street art, creating an atmosphere that Dope Era Magazine spotlighted as representative of Oakland's cultural identity.

== See also ==
- Nashville hot chicken
- List of chicken restaurants
