= Broaster Company =

American foodservice equipment manufacturer

Coordinates: 42°31′16″N 88°58′57″W

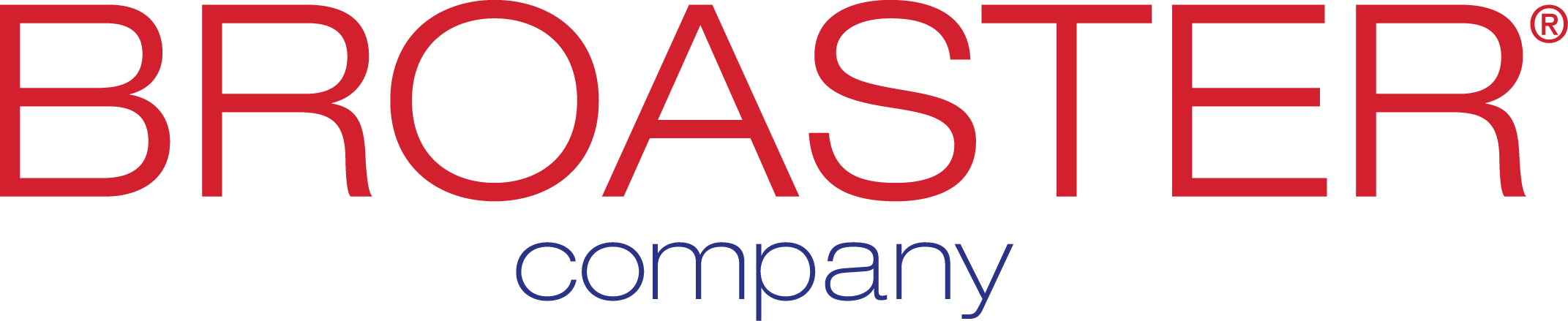
- Type: Private
- Industry: Manufacturing, foodservice
- Founded: 1954
- Founder: L. A. M. Phelan
- Headquarters: Beloit, Wisconsin
- Key people: Jay Cipra, CEO
- Products: Genuine Broaster Chicken, Broaster Pressure Fryers, ventless fryers, marinades, seasonings, coatings, frozen foods, cooking oils and sauces
- Website: www.broaster.com

Broaster Company is an American foodservice equipment manufacturer headquartered in Beloit, Wisconsin. It was founded by L.A.M. Phelan in 1954. The company is known for producing pressure fryers, licensing "Genuine Broaster Chicken", and operating a branded food program, "Broaster Express".

== History ==
The Broasting technique was introduced in 1954 when American businessman and inventor, L.A.M. Phelan, combined parts of a deep fryer and pressure cooker as a way to cook chicken more quickly. With his invention, Phelan trademarked the words "broaster" and "broasted food". Phelan manufactured the first Broaster Pressure Fryers under Flavor Fast Foods, Inc. and in 1956 formed the Broaster Company, expanding its line of offerings to include food product ingredients and accessories.

In 1970, the Alco Standard Corporation of Valley Forge, Pennsylvania purchased the Broaster Company. In 1991, Alco sold the Broaster Company to a group of private investors.

In 2009, Jay Cipra was named CEO of Broaster Company LLC, after serving as president of its parent company Broaster Company, Inc. Broaster Company celebrated its 60th anniversary in 2014.

== Operations ==
Broaster Company is the owner of a proprietary process that creates what the company calls "Genuine Broaster Chicken". The process uses the company's marinades and coating to prepare chicken which is then fried in a Broaster Pressure Fryer by an employee with training from the Broaster Company.

The Broaster Company licenses more than 5,000 restaurants, bars, and carryout locations in the United States with additional locations in 54 countries.

Among them is High Life Lounge in Des Moines, highlighting the chicken broasting process on a Season 3 (2010) episode of Man v. Food.

== Broasting ==
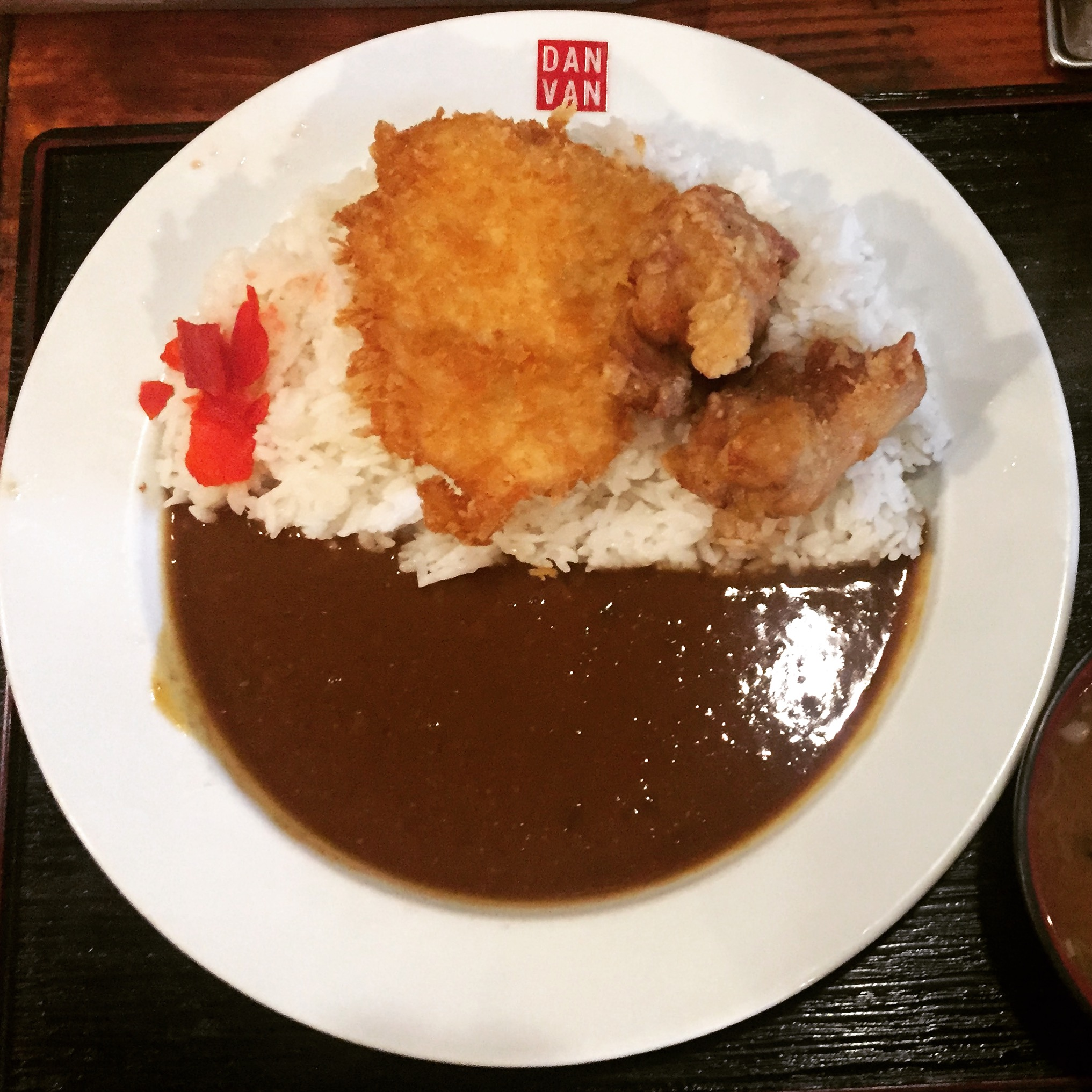
Broasted chicken with rice and curry

Broasting is a method of cooking chicken and other foods using a pressure fryer technique invented by L. A. M. Phelan and marketed by the Broaster Company.

The method essentially combines pressure cooking with deep frying to pressure fry chicken that has been marinated and breaded.

Internationally, broasted chicken remains highly popular in Middle Eastern and South Asian countries such as Saudi Arabia and Pakistan, as well as in Latin American countries such as Colombia and Peru. Many restaurants and fast-food chains in these countries also have the word "broast" in their names.

== Bibliography ==
- Nicholls, Walter (2004-05-26). "Beyond fried is broasted chicken". The Washington Post (via The Cincinnati Post). E. W. Scripps Company. Archived from the original on 2007-06-09.
