= Foreign branding =

Brand names meant to sound foreign

In advertising and marketing, foreign branding is the use of foreign or foreign-sounding brand names for companies, goods, and services to imply they are of foreign origin, generally to make them appear to come from a place that seems attractively fitting, or at least exotic. It may also be done if the country of origin has a poor image, in order to make customers believe that a company and/or its products originate from a country seen more favourably.

In non-English-speaking countries, many brands use English- or American-styled names to suggest foreign origin. In non-French- and non-Italian-speaking countries, many cosmetics, toiletry, and apparel brands use French- or Italian-styled names. Names suggesting Japanese, Scandinavian, German, and other origins are similarly used for effect outside their home countries.

== English-speaking countries ==
- Au Bon Pain, a bakery cafe with a French name, was founded in Boston. The company was originally owned by a French company but was sold later and never operated in France.
- Berghaus, a British outdoor equipment company, converted the name of its first premises (LD Mountain Centre) roughly into German to market its own products.
- Caffè Nero is a British-based chain of coffeehouses with Italian branding.
- Dolmio and Kan-Tong sauces have an Italian-sounding name and an Asian-sounding name, respectively, but are both made by Masterfoods in Australia.
- Frusen Glädjé, an ice cream with the misspelt Swedish words for "frozen happiness", was created in the U.S. by Richard E. Smith and later bought by Kraft Foods.
- Ginsu knives have a Japanese-sounding name (Ginsu, Kanji: 銀簾; Hiragana: ぎんす), but are made in America by Douglas Quikut.
- Giordano is a Hong Kong-based clothing brand, despite the name sounding Italian.
- Häagen-Dazs ice cream, intended to have a Danish-sounding name, was established by Jewish-Polish immigrants Reuben and Rose Mattus in the Bronx, New York.
- Matsui was the Japanese-sounding brand of the electrical retailer Dixons.
- Möben was the trademark of the English company Moben Kitchens, implying the perceived higher quality of German and Scandinavian kitchens.
- Outback Steakhouse is an American casual dining restaurant chain with an Australian theme.
- Pret a Manger sandwich retail chain is British but its name is French for "ready to eat" (properly spelt prêt à manger).
- Røde Microphones is spelt with an "ø" in middle which gives the impression that the company is Danish or Norwegian, when in fact it is Australian.
- Rykä shoes are given a Finnish-looking name, despite being an American company.
- Superdry is a British clothing company that presents itself as being Japanese via the use of grammatically incorrect Japanese language text and Japanese style foreign branding (in Japan 'Super Dry' is a brand of beer: Asahi Super Dry.)
- Texas de Brazil is an American steakhouse chain founded by a Lebanese immigrant, using a misspelt Portuguese name to portray itself as a Brazilian steakhouse.
- Vasque is a European-sounding brand from Red Wing Shoes, an American company.
- Vichyssoise, a cold potato and leek soup, was recreated at the Ritz-Carlton Hotel in New York in the 1910s, but it was given a French name. Its purported inventor, Louis Diat, was, however, a Frenchman who grew up in Vichy (hence the name), and his creation was based on much older French recipes that he recalled from his childhood.

== In non-English-speaking countries ==
- Australian Homemade is a Belgian maker of ice cream and candies.
- California Fried Chicken is an Indonesian fast food restaurant chain, principally serving fried chicken.
- Havaianas are Brazilian flip-flops named for the American island state of Hawaii.
- HokBen, formerly Hoka Hoka Bento, is an Indonesian fast food restaurant chain, principally served in Japanese style.
- KAIKO was a trademark of the German studio A.U.D.I.O.S., designed as a branding for selling their Japanese-inspired and styled games Apidya, Gem'X and Super Gem'Z.
- Lakmé is an Indian cosmetics brand named after the French opera of the same name.
- Miniso, a Chinese discount store, markets itself as Japanese, using Japanese wording on packaging and formerly a logo in Japanese katakana.
- Napapijri, an Italian clothing manufacturer with Finnish and Norwegian-themed branding.
- New Yorker, a German clothing retailer and name sponsor of the New Yorker Lions.
- Fashion accessories company Parfois (a French word meaning "sometimes") is in fact Portuguese.
- Pull&Bear is a Spanish clothing brand that markets California youth culture. 12 of 864 stores are in Anglophone countries.
- Roland is a Japanese manufacturer of electronic music equipment with the name being chosen with the global market in mind. It is, however, difficult to pronounce for Japanese speakers, for whom it is hard to differentiate "l" and "r" sounds.
- Tous les Jours is a South Korean bakery franchise owned by CJ Foodville, a business group of CJ Group. Tous les Jours means 'every day' in French.
- A number of Polish sparkling fruit wines are branded in a way alluding to Russia or Soviet Union despite being produced in Poland. The practice stems from Soviet-imported sparkling wines popular in times of the communist rule.

== Foreign orthography ==
Foreign letters and diacritical marks (such as the umlaut) are often used to give brand names foreign flavor. The heavy metal umlaut is used by a number of rock bands, usually to impart a generally Germanic and Gothic overtone to the band's name. Examples include Mötley Crüe, Motörhead, Queensrÿche, and Blue Öyster Cult.

Some fonts, sometimes called simulation typefaces, have also been designed that represent the characters of the Roman alphabet but evoke another writing system. This group includes typefaces designed to appear as Arabic, Chinese characters, Cyrillic, Indic scripts, Greek, Hebrew, Kana, or Thai. These are used largely for the purpose of novelty to make something appear foreign, or to make businesses such as restaurants offering foreign food clearly stand out.

=== Characters chosen for visual resemblance ===
==== Greek characters in Latin contexts ====
- The Greek sigma, Σ, is often used for Latin E, although it is the equivalent of Latin S. Examples include the film My Big Fat Greek Wedding (stylized as My Big Fat GRΣΣK Wedding), ABC Family's college-set series Greek (TV series) (stylized as GRΣΣK), and the slogan WΣ ARΣ HAPPY TO SΣRVΣ YOU on the Anthora coffee cup. Papers Please also uses Sigma to represent E, even though the game takes place in a place based on Russia.
- The lower-case Greek lambda, λ, was used for Latin A in the video game Hλlf-Life, apparently in reference to the use of λ as the symbol for the decay constant (related to the concept of half-life), and unlike most uses of foreign branding, not at all representing Greece or its culture.
- Omega is sometimes used as a replacement for O, like in the God of War franchise.
- Lowercase letter "u" is often substituted for "μ" when the Greek character is not typographically available; for example the unit "microfarad", correctly "μF", is often rendered as "uF" or "ufarad" in technical documents.

==== Cyrillic characters in Latin contexts ====
- Cyrillic Ya, Я, and I, И, resemble the reversed Latin letters R and N, respectively, and are often used as such. Examples include the video game TETЯIS.
- Cyrillic De, Д, is sometimes used in place of the Latin A, as in the film BORДT.

==== Other scripts ====
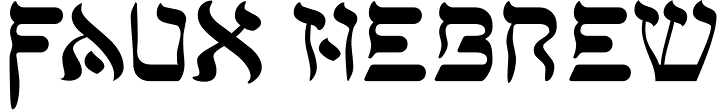
Hebrew foreign branding; note the use of actual Hebrew letters alef א (for X) and shin ש (for W).

- The London-based sushi restaurant YO! Sushi uses a typeface that makes the Y and O look like the Japanese katakana letters リ and ク (romaji: ri and ku).
- Letters of the Hebrew alphabet can be used to evoke Jewish culture in Faux Hebrew fonts.
- The television series Stargate SG-1 and Stargate Atlantis use a glyph resembling the greek letter Λ with an overring in place of the letter A in marketing materials, thus "STARGΛ̊TE SG-1" and "STARGATE ATLΛ̊NTIS", respectively. This usage derives from the symbol representing Earth on the titular Stargate, and is unrelated to the letter Å used in the Swedish, Danish, and Norwegian alphabets (which is pronounced similar to English "o").

=== Diacritics and foreign spellings ===
- The name of the French soft drink Pschitt is merely an onomatopoeic rendition of the sound made when the bottle is opened, but the -sch- and terminal -tt are German, rather than French, clusters.
- A premium-priced ice cream made by a company based in Bronx, New York was dubbed Häagen-Dazs to imply "old world craftsmanship and tradition". Häagen-Dazs has no meaning in any European language, although it contains several conventions used in European languages, such as the umlaut, and resembles a mixture of German and Hungarian. Häagen-Dazs spawned imitators, such as Frusen Glädjé (frusen glädje without the acute accent meaning "frozen happiness" in Swedish), another brand of premium ice cream. Häagen Dazs sued unsuccessfully in 1980 to stop them from using a "Scandinavian marketing theme", despite that the name Häagen-Dazs does not even remotely resemble anything Scandinavian itself.
- Le Tigre Clothing, an American brand which adopted a French name, has at times used an accent over the final "e" in tigre (French for tiger), although the French word itself contains no accent. In fact, with an accent (tigré) the word becomes an adjective meaning striped like the coat of a tiger.
- The fashion for the metal umlaut (use of umlauts in the names of heavy metal bands) can also be seen as a form of foreign branding.
- "Ye olde" is often used to represent the Old English language, due to the lack of the letter thorn on the typewriters.

=== Characters chosen by keyboard or encoding match ===
Where different keyboard layouts or character encodings map different scripts to the same key positions or code points, directly converting matching characters provides an alternative to transliteration when the appearance, rather than the meaning, is desired.

- The cover of Madonna's Greatest Hits Volume 2 contains the Japanese characters モヂジラミミヂ. These characters share the same keys on a dual-layout Japanese/English keyboard as the letters M-A-D-O-N-N-A. The characters are otherwise unrelated and the resulting Japanese text ("mo-dji-ji-ra-mi-mi-dji") is meaningless.

== See also ==
- Brand blunder
- Hyperforeignism
