= Metal umlaut =

Gratuitous diacritic used in the names of some rock bands

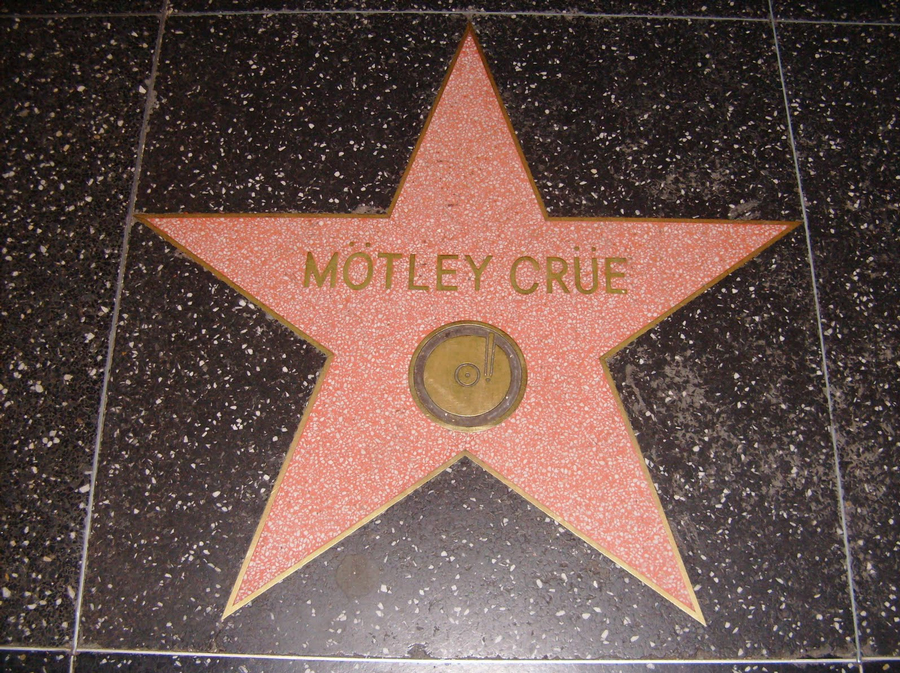
Mötley Crüe's Hollywood Walk of Fame star, which shows the two metal umlauts used in the band's name.

A metal umlaut (also known as röck döts) is a diacritic that is sometimes used gratuitously or decoratively over letters in the names of mainly hard rock or heavy metal bands—for example, those of Blue Öyster Cult, Queensrÿche, Motörhead, the Accüsed, Mötley Crüe, Hüsker Dü, and the parody bands Spın̈al Tap and Green Jellÿ.

== Usage ==
Among English speakers, the use of umlaut marks and other diacritics with a blackletter typeface is a form of foreign branding, which has been attributed to a desire for a "gothic horror" feel. The metal umlaut is not generally intended to affect the pronunciation of the band's name, unlike the umlaut in German (where the letters u and ü, a and ä, as well as o and ö, represent distinct vowels) and the Scandinavian languages (where å, ä/æ and a, ö/ø and o are distinct letters).

== History ==
The first gratuitous use of the umlaut in the name of a hard rock or metal band appears to have been by Blue Öyster Cult in 1971. Blue Öyster Cult's website states the umlaut was added by guitarist and keyboardist Allen Lanier, as does Blue Öyster Cult chronicler Bolle Gregmar, but rock critic Richard Meltzer claims to have suggested it to their producer and manager Sandy Pearlman just after Pearlman came up with the name: "I said, 'How about an umlaut over the O?' Metal had a Wagnerian aspect anyway." Meltzer's claim is supported by an anecdote of Pearlman's.

== Reactions ==
Speakers of languages which use an umlaut to designate a pronunciation change may understand the intended effect, but perceive the result differently. When Mötley Crüe visited Germany, singer Vince Neil said the band could not figure out why "the crowds were chanting, 'Mutley Cruh! Mutley Cruh!'"

These decorative umlauts have been parodied in film and fiction; in an interview about the mockumentary film This Is Spın̈al Tap, fictional rocker David St. Hubbins (Michael McKean) says: "It's like a pair of eyes. You're looking at the umlaut, and it's looking at you." The heavy metal band Gwar parodied the use of metal umlauts in a lyric insert included with its first record, stylizing the song names with gratuitous diacritics. In 1997, the satirical newspaper The Onion published an article titled "Ünited Stätes Toughens Image With Umlauts".

== Examples in music ==
=== English-speaking countries ===
- The Accüsed – American сrossover thrash band.
- Assück – American grindcore band.
- Barbariön – Australian metal band.
- Beowülf – American thrash metal band.
- Blue Öyster Cult – American hard rock band.
- The Crüxshadows – American alternative rock band.
- Dälek – American hip-hop band.
- Death in June – British dark folk/experimental band. Early works used umlauts and accented "e"s, such as on The Wörld Thät Sümmer (1985) and Thé Wäll Öf Säcrificé (1989). The band's name was stylized as Deäth In Jüne and Déäth In Jüné, respectively, on each.
- Deströyer 666 – Australian thrash metal/black metal band.
- Dethklok – fictional metal band from the cartoon Metalocalypse, sometimes spelled as "Dëthkløk" in the band's logo.
- Green Jellÿ – American comedy metal band, originally spelled (and still pronounced) Green Jellö.
- G̈r̈oẗus̈ – American Industrial rock band. Notably, their logo design has umlaut marks over only the consonants.
- Hüsker Dü – American punk band (the game "Hūsker Dū?" was published with macrons instead of umlauts).
- Infernäl Mäjesty – Canadian thrash metal band.
- Jack Ü – American EDM DJ duo, side group and collaborative project, consisting of Mad Decent founder Diplo and Owsla founder Skrillex.
- Jay-Z – American rapper. Has used "Jaÿ-Z" on his debut album Reasonable Doubt (1996) and on streaming platforms in 2015 and 2026
- Kïll Cheerleadër – Canadian punk metal band.
- Lȧȧz Rockit – American thrash band. German pronunciation would roughly be "Let's rock it."
- Leftöver Crack – American anarcho punk band.
- Maxïmo Park – British indie rock band.
- Mïngle Härde – British hardcore punk/noise rock band.
- Mötley Crüe – American glam metal band.
- Motörhead – English rock band.
- Moxy Früvous – Canadian political satire band.
- Queensrÿche – American progressive metal band.
- Ruste⃛d Root – American jam band. Uses a three-dot umlaut over the "e" in its logo, as seen on its album covers.
- Spın̈al Tap – British semi-fictional band, with a dotless letter i and a metal umlaut over the n.
- Stöner – American stoner rock band.
- Toilet Böys – American punk band.
- Ünloco – American nu metal band.
- Yächtley Crëw – American yacht rock band.
- Yeat - American rage rapper. Much of his discography uses an umlaut over the "e" in song and album titles, such as his first three albums, Up 2 Më (2021), 2 Alivë (2022), and Aftërlyfe (2023).
- Znöwhite – American thrash metal band.

=== Other countries ===
- Аквариум – Russian rock band, whose name is stylized as "Åквариум" on their logo.
- Crashdïet – Swedish glam metal band.
- Dün – French progressive rock and zeuhl band.
- Föxx Salema – Brazilian heavy metal artist.
- Girugämesh – Japanese rock band.
- Kobaïan – French progressive rock band Magma sings in this constructed language, which has many diacritic symbols in its written form.
- Közi – Japanese rock musician.
- Mägo de Oz – Spanish folk metal band.
- Moottörin Jyrinä – Finnish heavy metal band. The umlaut in Moottörin is gratuitous, but the one in Jyrinä is not.
- Motör Militia – Bahraini thrash metal band.
- Mütiilation – French black metal band.
- Püdelsi – Polish rock band.
- Röyksopp – Norwegian electronic duo; the correct Norwegian would be "Røyksopp".
- Törr – Czech thrash metal band.

== Other examples ==
=== Video games ===
- Brütal Legend – action-adventure video game
- Crüe Ball – a pinball game featuring the music of Mötley Crüe
- DieselStörmers – the original title of Rogue Stormers, a 2016 multiplayer platformer.
- Dynamite Düx – a beat 'em up video game
- Lars Ümlaüt – a character in the Guitar Hero series

=== Other ===
- Asüna – a Canadian automobile brand.
- Brüno – a film by Sacha Baron Cohen.
- Cröonchy Stars – a discontinued breakfast cereal.
- Deathtöngue – the original name of a metal band in the comic Bloom County (changed, after media publicity, to "Billy and the Boingers")
- Häagen-Dazs – an ice cream brand introduced in 1961.
- Löded Diper – the name of the fictional band that Rodrick Heffley plays in the Diary of a Wimpy Kid book series.
- Scäb – the name of a fictional band in the 1999 animated sitcom Home Movies.
- Shoë – the name of a fictional band created by Joe Thomas and Sian Gibson in a series 8 episode of Taskmaster. Thomas's description of using a "rock 'n' roll umlaut" coined the episode's title.
- Stüssy – a fashion house started by Shawn Stussy.
- Tonfön – a Tongan telephone company.

== See also ==
- Devil horns, heavy metal hand signal
- Disemvoweling in band names
- Faux Cyrillic (Faцx Cуяillic)
- Foreign branding
- IDN homograph attack
- Leet
- Nu metal, also stylized as nü-metal
- Pseudolocalization, a technique of testing software's ability to be localized, using diacritical marks, faux Cyrillic and other lookalikes of (usually) English characters to simulate other languages for purposes of string handling
- Sensational spelling
