= Brand blunder =

Error in advertising that could be potentially offensive or vulgar

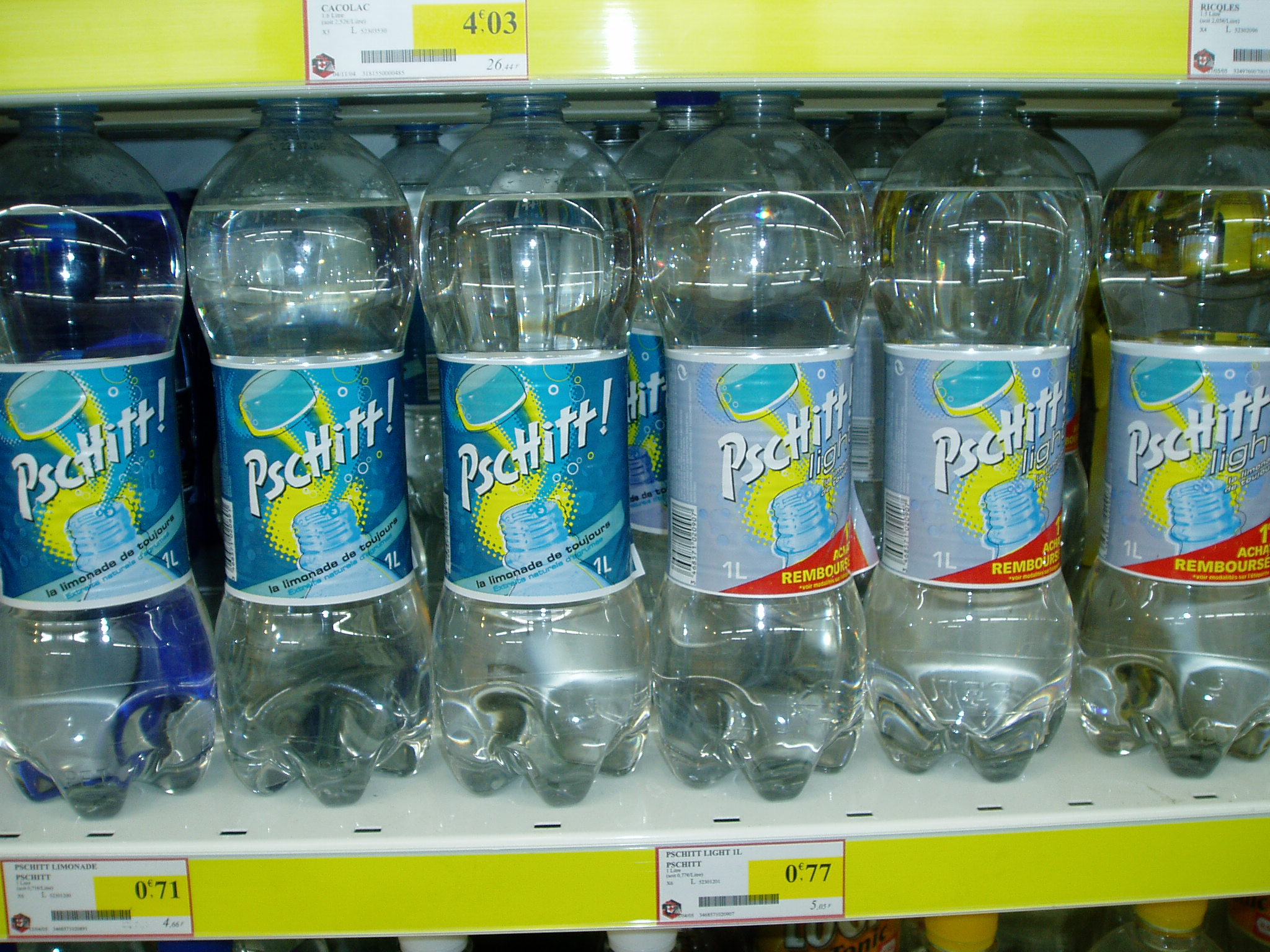
The French fizzy drink brand Pschitt, meant to evoke the sound of opening a soda can, may have other connotations in English.

A brand blunder is an error associated with the branding of a product, especially a new product in a new market. Reasons for such slips include the lack of understanding of the language, culture and consumer attitudes in the new market.

There are numerous examples of brand blunders in marketing history; there are also numerous urban legends surrounding brand blunders, where there is little evidence of an actual blunder.

== International branding issues ==
Problems with international product branding are often associated with the process of language localisation, in which the product brand name or advertising slogan carries a different meaning in the language of the target market. In addition to linguistic aspects, issues of cultural sensitivity can affect the success of a brand.

This is a risk faced by companies entering a new market. In international marketing, a brand name must be distinctive and easy to pronounce across multiple markets, but it must not have unintended negative or obscene connotations. This risk is usually mitigated by factoring cultural research into a branding strategy.

== True cases ==
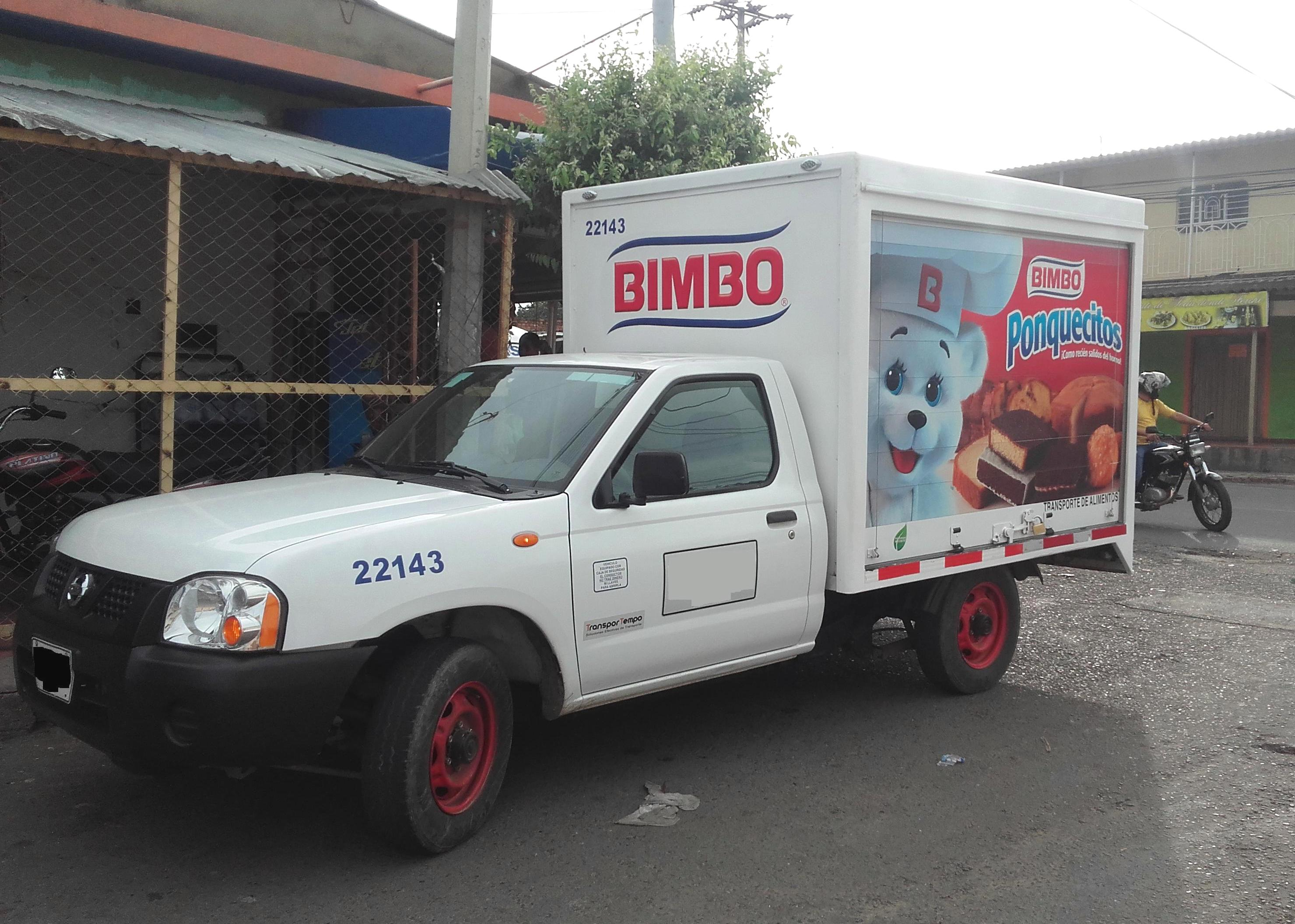
A Colombian van branded with Bimbo bread

Examples of brand names which have proved unsuitable for use in most English-speaking countries have included:

- Alu-Fanny, a French aluminium foil
- Barf, a laundry detergent from Iran's Paxan Industries
- Barfy, a brand of frozen hamburgers in Argentina
- Bimbo, a Mexican brand of bread
- Calpis, a Japanese soft drink
- Crapsy Fruit, a French breakfast cereal
- Atum Bom, a Portuguese brand of tinned tuna
- Spunk, Danish confectionery
- Kräpp, Swedish toilet paper (Swedish language pronunciation of crêpe)
- Kum Onit, a German make of pencil sharpeners
- Laputa: Castle in the Sky had its title shortened to just "Castle in the Sky" in the United States and Latin America due to the titular castle Laputa being phonetically identical to the Spanish phrase "La Puta", which translates to "the bitch" or "the whore".
- Plopp, a Swedish chocolate bar
- Pocari Sweat, a Japanese sports drink
- Poo, type of curry powder in Argentina
- Pschitt, a French fizzy soft drink
- A number of Belgian beer brands, such as Silly, Prik, Slag, La Plope, Pee Klak and Witte Dikke

Brand names and advertising campaigns which have proved controversial throughout their existence have included the following instances:

- In the 1970s, hair product company Clairol created a curling iron called the Mist Stick. While the product sold well internationally, it did not sell well in German-speaking countries because the word "mist" is German slang for "manure" or "feces," causing customers to turn away from the product. A similar situation was done with the Silver Shadow, where Rolls-Royce was forced to rename the car because it was originally called the "Silver Mist."
- In 1997, the sportswear company Reebok introduced a women's running shoe called "Incubus"; the company was forced to recall the product when it was called to their attention that an incubus is a mythical male demon that rapes women in their sleep.
- A 1997 direct mailer from Weight Watchers featuring Sarah Ferguson, with a caption stating that losing weight was "harder than outrunning the paparazzi," appeared in mailboxes in the days before and following the death of Ferguson's former sister-in-law Diana, Princess of Wales, an incident in which paparazzi were at the time suspected to have played a role. The company quickly pulled the ads.
- An April 2002 Starbucks ad featured twin cups of their Tazo drinks with the caption "Collapse into cool" and an airborne dragonfly, imagery and wording which reminded many of the recent 9/11 attacks. Though the ads were created before the attacks and the resemblance was coincidental, the company apologized and pulled the posters.
- In 2005 the electronics company Nintendo brought to market in South Korea an electronic dictionary for children named Touch Dic; it was subsequently renamed Touch Dictionary as the name sounded too similar to the slang term "dick."
- In 2006, Sony had a limited Dutch billboard campaign promoting the then-upcoming arrival of the white PlayStation Portable by featuring a black woman and white woman with respectively colored clothing and hair in confrontational poses. After accusations of racism, Sony pulled the ads.
- In 2008, Greyhound Canada hastily pulled the slogan "There's a reason you've never heard of 'bus rage'" after Tim McLean was murdered and beheaded by fellow passenger Vince Weiguang Li aboard a bus in Portage la Prairie, Manitoba.
- A Nike ad on Oscar Pistorius' website used the caption "I am the bullet in the chamber" and was pulled in 2013 after his arrest in connection with the shooting death of his girlfriend, Reeva Steenkamp.
- In 2016, Nike introduced a special edition of its Air Force 1 shoes during Chinese Lunar New Year, bearing a “發” (“be rich/prosperous”) on its left heel, and an upside down “福” (“have fortune”; additionally, “upside down”, or “倒”, is a homonym for “arrived”, or “到”) on its right heel. However, this special edition has been ridiculed in the Chinese market, because combining these two characters, or “發福”, literally means “get obese” in Chinese.

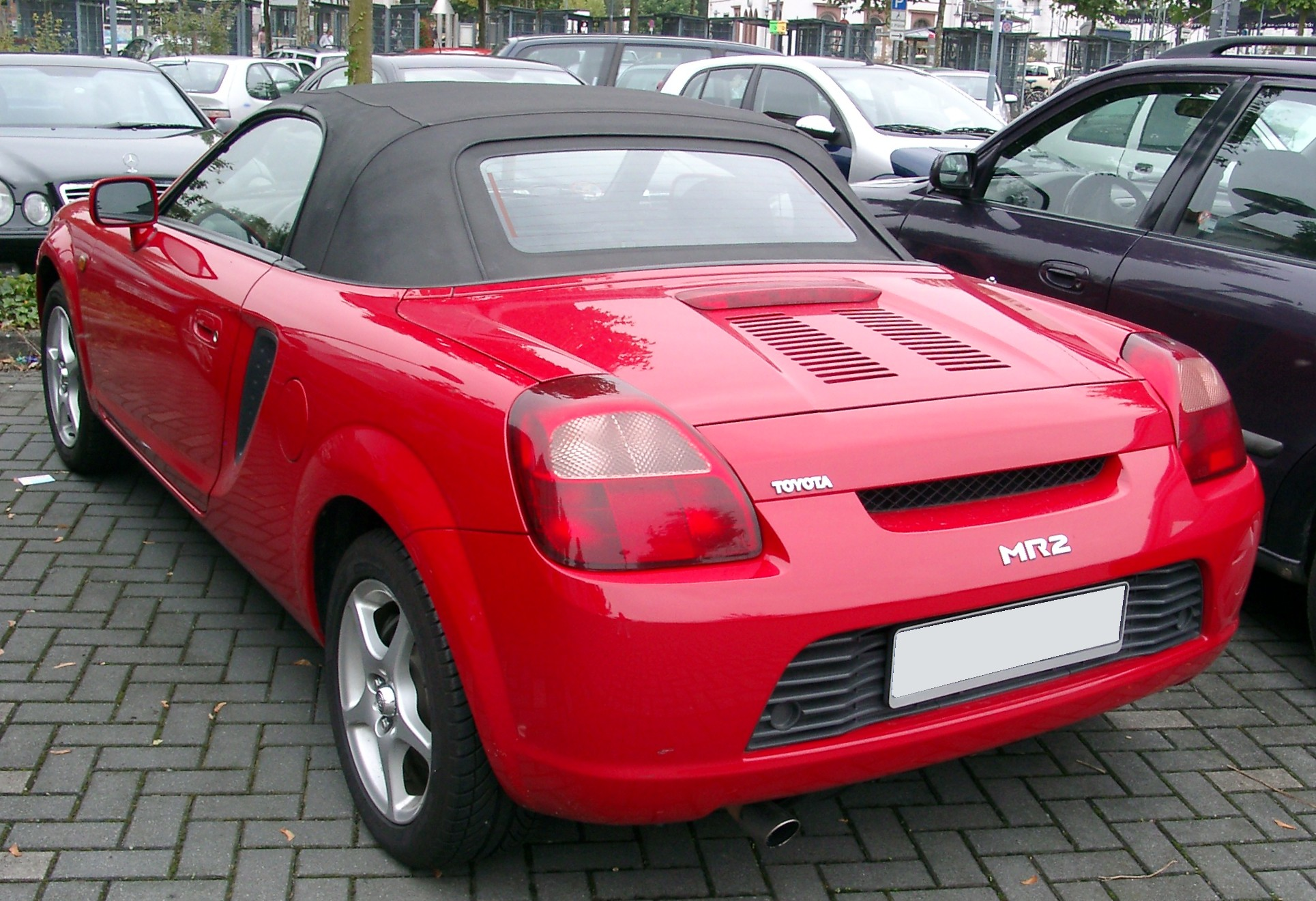
The Toyota MR2 sounded unusual in French

- The Honda Jazz was originally named the Honda Fitta. However, when marketing collateral reached the Swedish office of the company, it was pointed out that fitta is a vulgar slang term for "vagina" in Swedish and Norwegian. The model was renamed "Jazz" for most markets, with the name "Fit" being used in Japan, China, and the Americas.
- Similarly, Mitsubishi found that the name of its Pajero model was the same as the Spanish term for "wanker"; likewise, the name of the Toyota MR2, when spoken in French, bore an uncomfortable phonetic similarity to the French word merdeux, meaning "shit."
- German manufacturer Audi launched the e-tron electric car sub-brand in concept cars in 2009 and in production models in 2018, despite the French word "étron" meaning "crap."
- Hyundai Kona, a compact SUV made by Hyundai, means "Hyundai is facing agonizing death" or "Hyundai is dying" in Polish. "Kona" itself sounds like "konak" (erection) in Indonesian or "cona" (vagina) in Portuguese, although Hyundai Kona was phased out in Indonesia and replaced by Hyundai Creta instead and the Korean Automaker sold the Kona nameplate as Kauai in several countries.
- In 2020, the Renault Arkana SUV was renamed Renault Mégane Conquest in Croatia, Slovenia, Bosnia and Herzegovina, and Serbia, after the local Renault subsidiary objected to the similarity with the nickname of Serbian mobster and warlord Željko Ražnatović "Arkan". Earlier unfortunate car model name choices that were not rectified include Alfa Romeo MiTo (mito means "bribe" in several South Slavic languages) and Ford Kuga ("bubonic plague").
- A name given by IKEA's Chinese website for its stuffed wolf toy Lufsig, Lo Mo Sai (路姆西), contained a homophone of Hai (閪), a profane Cantonese word meaning "vagina"; the name itself could be written as Lo Mo Hai (老母閪), meaning "mother's vagina."
- Swiss beverage brand Schweppes were quick to pull a campaign in Italy promoting its Indian tonic water under the name "Il water", which means "the toilet" in Italian slang. The name "Tonica" was chosen instead.
- Ayds diet suppressant candy, which had existed for decades prior, continued to use this phonetically identical brand name through the 1980s, as the HIV/AIDS epidemic continued to grow. In 1985–1986, use of the name was in fact defended by executives of the company that manufactured it, as a boon to sales. Sales eventually plummeted, and the product name was changed in 1988–1989.
- In 2011, an internal leak of the Dell Latitude ST tablet (codenamed Peju) spread virally on the internet and received some attention in Indonesia, since peju means sperm in Indonesian slang.
- In 2012, a clothing store named "Hitler" opened in Ahmedabad, Gujarat, India. The store immediately became embroiled in an international controversy over its association with the German Nazi-era leader, Adolf Hitler.
- Kiri cheese, produced by Bel Group, was rebranded as "Kibi" in Iran because of the derogatory meaning of kiri in Persian for male genitalia and rotten or rank.
- Microsoft's Lumia brand translates to prostitute in Spanish, but it is an uncommon word with Romani roots.
- Apple's Siri personal assistant pronunciation in Japan as "shiri" translates to buttocks, and in Indonesia, siri translates to "de facto (unregistered) marriage".
- The World Wrestling Entertainment pay-per-view event Elimination Chamber carries a different name in Germany, "No Escape", in order to avoid associations with the Holocaust.
- In 2019, Mushkegowuk Council Grand Chief told the Canadian Broadcasting Corporation that Heinz's latest 'Mayochup' product (a portmanteau of mayonnaise and ketchup) means "shit-face" in Cree. The incident went viral on Twitter.
- In 2019, Kontool, a BI software based in Germany, decided to use another name in Indonesia since Kontool sounds like kontol (penis) in Indonesian slang.
- In 2020, Bank Artos renamed itself into Bank Jago. It went viral in Indonesia, since pronunciation of Bank Jago is similar to bang jago (an ad hominem rhetorical tactic in Indonesian slang to end any argument in a passive-aggressive way).
- After the 2017 Boston Marathon, participants received an email from Adidas. The subject line read, "Congrats, you survived the Boston Marathon!", wording which reminded many of the 2013 Boston Marathon bombing. A public apology soon followed.
- Telaso, a brand for various products, is an expletive on Southern and Western Sulawesi language which means smegma.
- Phanteks, a Dutch PC chassis manufacturer. Although Phanteks should be pronounced as "fan-techs," Indonesian people pronounce it as "Panteks," (pronounced as "pun-techs"), where Pantek is an expletive in Sumatran Malay (Minangkabau, Ocu, Palembang, Pasisi, etc.) and the Maduranese language, meaning "fuck you."
- Sangean, a Taiwanese consumer electronic brand, means "too easy to sexually arouse" in Indonesian slang.
- ITIL, an IT activities, and Itel Mobile, a mobile phone manufacturer, means vulva in Indonesian.
- BEGO, a dental health industry, GoBlog, a content management system written in Golang, and Daihatsu Be‣go, crossover made by Daihatsu which means retarded in Indonesian slang.
- MeMeX, a darknet search engine which sounds similar with memek (vagina) in Indonesian slang.
- In 2008, Esia, an Indonesian fixed-wireless CDMA carrier launched Esia Bispak, a service when Esia users can try various GSM carrier tariff to make informed decisions and benchmarks against Esia's tariff. However, the service itself received backlash for two reasons: first, it worsened the carrier tariff war, since it implies that GSM's tariff are more expensive than Esia's; second, the name of the service has a misogynistic nature, since bispak itself means slut/female prostitute in Indonesian pejoratives.
- Also in 2008, Ikea released a brown rug called Hoven, which in Czech means "shits." It was later renamed and the original Hoven version was discounted, resulting in a sign announcing "shits on sale."
- In 2007, TrekStor, a German electronics company, released a new line of products known as the "i.Beat MP3s". One of these was named the "i.Beat Blaxx", before it was changed to the TrekStor Blaxx when it was pointed out that it sounded exactly like "I beat blacks" in English.

== The internet ==
The rise of the internet has provided new ways for marketers to interact with the public. The resultant seemingly trial-and-error attempts to capitalize on new technologies have resulted in some of the most public brand blunders in recent memory.

- A 2012 internet promotion for Mountain Dew titled "Dub the Dew" was cancelled after the website dubthedew.com was compromised by trolls. Participants were supposed to submit and vote on potential names for an apple-flavored variant of Mountain Dew. Instead, the contest, upon discovery by 4chan, was bombarded with unusable and offensive names. The site was taken down quickly and the promotion cancelled, but not before the name "Hitler did nothing wrong" reached the No. 1 position and the top of the page was hacked to show a satirical message falsely claiming that the Mossad were responsible for the September 11 attacks.
- Nestlé committing blunders twice: In 2012, Nestlé announced the Kit Kat's official Instagram account by posting their first picture on Instagram, a KitKat bear mascot. However, Nestlé took the picture down after backlash due to the Kit Kat bear's resemblance to Pedobear.
- In 2014, a DiGiorno tweet using a trending hashtag accidentally injected pizza marketing into an otherwise serious conversation about domestic violence. The reply "You had pizza" to the hashtag #WhyIStayed was not well received by the online public, with the marketing account making dozens of apology tweets following the incident.
- In February 2020, the official Peanuts account on Twitter posted a graphic featuring Charlie Brown and African-American character Franklin with text reading "You’re one of the good ones." The tweet was quickly pulled and an apology issued after users pointed out the graphic's accidental racism, where "one of the good ones" is often used as a backhanded compliment towards minorities, implying that most are bad people.
- On July 6, 2026, the Pepsi account on Threads shared a post about Pepsi Wild Cherry titled "Pepsi Wild Cherry is what happens when regular cherry stops asking permission." The wording mirrored language of sexual assault or a "rape joke". Critics also argued that using phrases like "stops asking permission" or "stops asking consent" in a lighthearted brand slogan was tone-deaf. Within 24 hours, the post was deleted and Pepsi issued an apology titled "Our recent Wild Cherry post landed in a way we never intended. We hear you, we're sorry, and the post has been deleted."

== Urban legends ==
Urban legends about brand blunders are popular, because they use familiar urban legend motifs such as the incompetent corporation or the ignorant foreigner. Often the reality is far less dramatic, and the stories, which are even retold in marketing textbooks as cautionary tales, are rarely backed up by researched data about sales.

- Gerber: It was once believed that Africans were horrified over Gerber baby food. Since food containers in Africa often contain what is pictured on their label, popular lore maintained that Africans thought that jars of Gerber baby food contained ground-up infants.
- Electrolux: Swedish vacuum manufacturer Electrolux sold products successfully in the United Kingdom using a slogan produced by the English agency Cogent Elliot: "Nothing sucks like an Electrolux." Although many Americans think this is an example of a blunder, the slang disparagement "sucks" (originating in American English) was claimed to be a rude word in British English, compared to a strong contention of dislike or hate in American English.
- Pepsi: Pepsi allegedly introduced their slogan "Come alive with the Pepsi Generation" into the Chinese market. Translated into Mandarin Chinese, it read "Pepsi brings your ancestors back from the grave." A similar claim has been made for the "Coke adds life" slogan, with the target market listed as anything from Taiwan to Thailand to Japan.
- Coca-Cola: The name Coca-Cola rendered phonetically in Chinese can sound like the words for "bite the wax tadpole" (simplified Chinese: 蝌蚪啃蜡; traditional Chinese: 蝌蚪啃蠟; pinyin: Kēdǒu kěn là) or "mare stuffed with wax." (骒马口蠟) Before marketing in China, the company found a close phonetic equivalent, kěkǒukělè (可口可乐), which roughly means "let your mouth rejoice" or "tasty and enjoyable." It was never marketed by the company using the other phrases, though individual merchants may have made such signs.
- An urban legend holds that the Chevrolet Nova automobile sold poorly in Spain, Spanish-speaking Caribbean nations, and Latin America, as "no va" means "doesn't go" in Spanish. But in truth, the car sold well. The same has been said of the Vauxhall Nova, which had to be sold as an Opel Corsa in Spain. It was confirmed to be a myth, as the car was built in Spain and known as a Corsa from the outset. (The stress of "Nova" is quite different from "no va," and Spanish speakers would be familiar with Nova as the Latin word for "new." The legend is the equivalent of claiming a furniture set called Notable didn't sell well in America because of the name's similarity to "no table.")
- Claims that the Buick LaCrosse name in translation becomes the equivalent of "to cross oneself," a Quebec French slang term for masturbation, are overstated. Buick initially used the nameplate Allure in Canada in an overabundance of caution when introducing the model in 2005, but abandoned this dual branding early in the 2010 model year. The vehicle now uses the LaCrosse branding in all countries.
- Fake ads, often with sexually explicit content such as one for Puma and an even less plausible pedophilia-themed one for Breyers, have attracted attention and even official responses from the company denying affiliation.
