= YBM =

YBM may refer to:

- ybm, ISO 639 code for the Yaben language
- YBM Inc. (formerly YBM Si-sa), a Korean educational company which is also known for developing the Nintendo DS software Touch Dictionary
  - YBM Seoul Records, a former subsidiary of YBM group, later sold to Kakao and renamed Kakao M
- YBM, former IATA code for Bronson Creek Airport, Canada
- Young Bretons Movement/Ar Vretoned Yaouank, the youth section of the Breton Party in France
- YBM Magnex, originally known as Alberta-incorporated company Partecs, purportedly used in a "pump and dump" scheme
