= Ravensdale =

Ravensdale may refer to:

- Ravensdale, County Louth, Ireland
- Ravensdale, New South Wales, Australia
- Ravensdale, Washington, United States
- RavensDale, a video game
