= Frusen Glädjé =

Defunct U.S. ice cream brand

Frusen Glädjé was a company that made premium ice cream for the American market, founded in 1980 by Richard E. Smith. Although the ice cream was made in the U.S., it used a quasi-Swedish name: frusen glädjé (IPA: [ˈfrʉ̂ːsɛn ˈɡlɛ̂ːdjɛ]), without the acute accent above the e, this is Swedish and means "frozen happiness".

After the brand was sold several times, the brand name is currently no longer in use.

== History ==
Frusen Glädjé was produced at a Dairy Lea plant with special equipment and sold in 10 states in 1981, including New York and California. Frusen Glädjé was available in eight flavors (15 in the New York shop). Frusen Glädjé was distributed in every state by the end of 1982, reaching an annual production of 30 million pints, up from 18 million in 1981. Erhard Sommer was the company president.

The brand's marketing materials called it "[t]he ice cream that appeals to the sybaritic buyer with a taste for the very finest." Television commercials typically featured the catch phrase, "I ate all the Frusen Glädjé." Another catchphrase used was "Enjoy the Guilt", which appeared in print advertising and also on small crystal ice cream bowls, which were available via mail order from the company.

=== Conflict with Häagen-Dazs ===
Another American ice cream producer, Häagen-Dazs, sued unsuccessfully in 1980 to stop Frusen Glädjé from using a "Scandinavian marketing theme". Häagen-Dazs's complaints included Frusen Glädjé's "prominently displayed list of the product's natural ingredients, a list of artificial ingredients not found in the ice cream, directions for serving and eating the ice cream (essentially that it was best served soft), and a map of Scandinavia". The court ruled against Häagen-Dazs on the grounds of unclean hands, as Häagen-Dazs had similarly marketed itself as Scandinavian (specifically Danish) without having any real connection to the region.

=== Acquisition by Kraft Foods ===
In 1985, Smith sold Frusen Glädjé to Kraft General Foods. A Kraft spokeswoman states that Kraft sold its Frusen Glädjé license to the Unilever corporation in 1993. A spokesman for Unilever claims that Frusen Glädjé was not part of the deal. The brand has since disappeared, although in 2016 a trademark for "Frusen Glädjé" was filed by Papilion, LLC.

== In Media ==
- Frusen Gläjdé appeared in the TV series *The Americans* (season 3, episode 1).

== See also ==
- Foreign branding
