= Rykä =

American footwear brand

- Company type: Privately held
- Industry: Sportswear and sporting goods
- Founded: 1987
- Headquarters: Irvine, California
- Products: Women's athletic shoes and apparel
- Parent: Caleres
- Website: www.ryka.com

Rykä is an athletic shoe brand for women.

== History ==
Rykä was founded in 1987 by Sheri Poe, who wanted to design a better-fitting athletic shoe for women. The company also produces athletic apparel for women.

Rykä merged with Global Sports in 1997. Global Sports sold its branded division in 1999 to American Sporting Goods Corporation. The company is now owned by Caleres Inc., who bought American Sporting Goods in 2011.

== Publicity ==
Poe is credited with introducing Princess Diana to her shoes, through her creation of the Ryka Rose Foundation, a nonprofit organization working to stop violence against women.

Since 2008, Kelly Ripa has been the spokeswoman for Rykä shoes.

The Rykä brand is an example of foreign branding.
