= Moottörin Jyrinä =

Children's heavy metal band from Finland

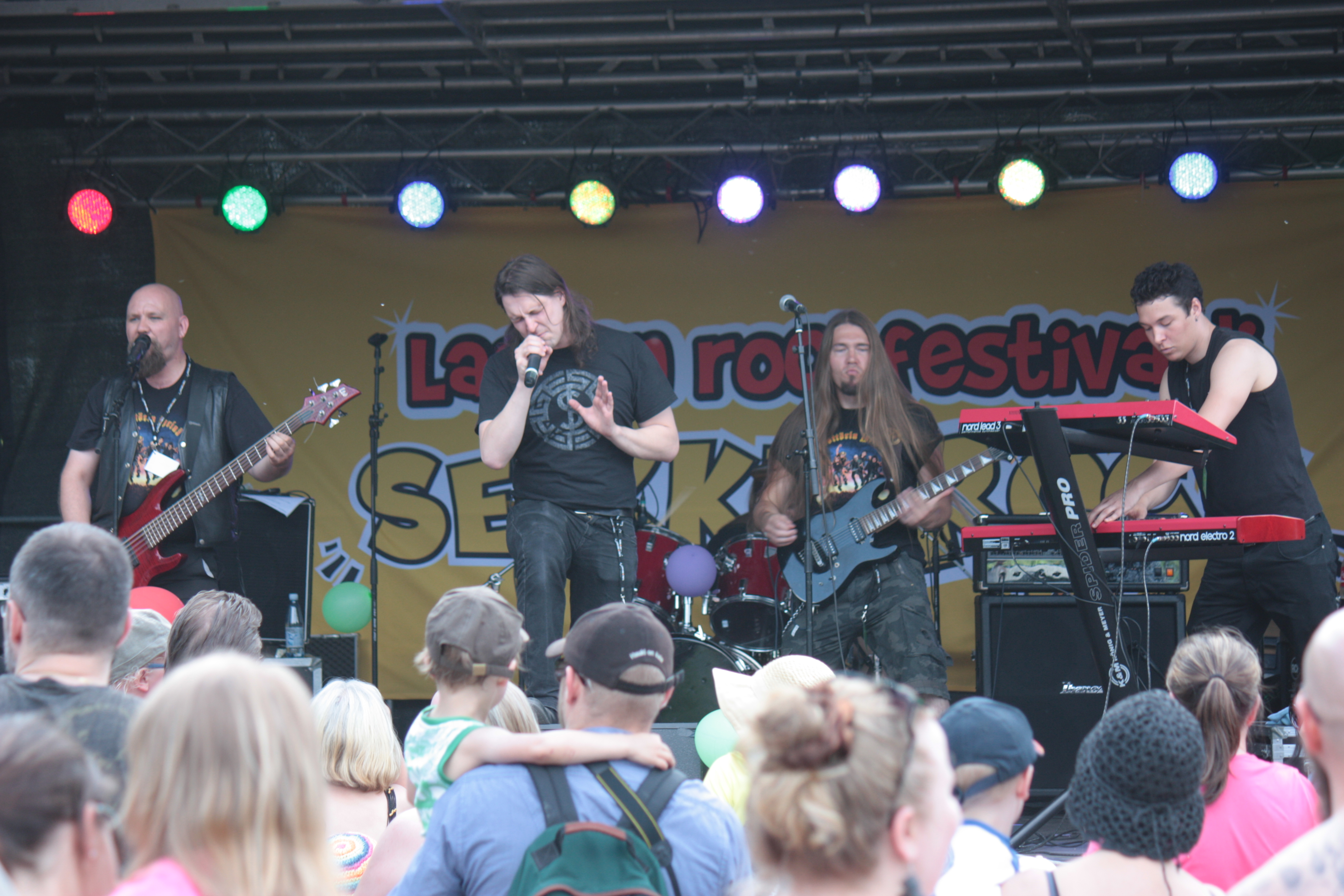
Moottörin Jyrinä appearing in the Seikkisrock event at the adventure park in Turku, Finland in summer 2011

Moottörin Jyrinä (pronounced [ˈmoːtːørin ˈjyrinæ]; lit. 'Rumble of [an] engine') is a children's heavy metal band from Helsinki, Finland.

Moottörin Jyrinä plays cover songs from classic 1980s heavy metal songs (from such bands as Iron Maiden, Motörhead, and Ozzy Osbourne), with new, child-friendly Finnish language lyrics. Most of the lyrics have an educational tone. The band appears in both children's and adults' events.

The name of the band is a parody of Motörhead. The first umlaut is gratuitous, though the second is not. In proper grammatical Finnish the name would be "Moottorin jyrinä".

== Discography ==
- Peikot (2015, VLMedia Oy)
- Metallimyrsky (2011, VL-musiikki)
- Nupit Luoteeseen - ep (2011, VL-musiikki)
- Lapsimetallin kuninkaat (2010, VL-musiikki)

== Members ==
- Marko Skou - vocals, bass
- Esa Orjatsalo - guitar, background vocals
- Jaakko Halttunen - guitar, background vocals
- Jani Landen - drums

== Former members ==
- Janne Hirvonen - vocals (quit the band in 2005)
- Harri Tuhkio - drums (quit the band in 2006)
- Kimmo Kovanen - guitar (quit the band in 2008)
- Aleksi Parviainen - vocals (2005 - 2012)
- Samuli Federley - guitar, background vocals (2008 - 2014)
- Markus Hellas - keyboards (2008 - 2014)

== See also ==
- Hevisaurus
