= Pioneer Chicken =

American fried chicken restaurant chain

Pioneer Chicken Take Out Corporation
- Trade name: Pioneer Chicken
- Industry: Restaurant
- Founded: 1961; 65 years ago
- Area served: Bell Gardens, California; Los Angeles, California
- Products: Fried chicken
- Website: https://pioneerchickenla.com

The Pioneer Chicken Take Out Corporation, doing business as Pioneer Chicken, is an American fried chicken restaurant chain which was founded in Echo Park, Los Angeles in 1961 by H. R. Kaufman. During the 1970s, several locations operated in Honolulu on the island of Oahu, Hawaii. When Kaufman sold the chain in 1987, there were 270 restaurants operated by 220 franchisees. In 1993, Pioneer Chicken was taken over by AFC Enterprises, the parent company of Popeyes. Almost all Pioneer Chicken locations were then converted to Popeyes. The franchisees of two locations resisted the change, retaining the Pioneer Chicken branding: Los Angeles and Bell Gardens, California.

== History ==
=== Origins ===
It was named after Pioneer Market, a now-defunct small chain of supermarkets in Los Angeles. The original location in Echo Park was located next to the Pioneer Market (the original 1932 market was razed in the 1980s due to the Sylmar earthquake) at Echo Park Avenue and Sunset Boulevard, which was replaced by a Walgreens Pharmacy in 2004. Due to considerable redevelopment activity in the neighborhood, the original Pioneer Chicken location was shut down in March 2009 and replaced by a Little Caesar's Pizza the following year. During the 1980s, Los Angeles Lakers announcer Chick Hearn and former football player O. J. Simpson advertised for the restaurant. The narrator of the 1972 song "Carmelita" by Warren Zevon sings of buying heroin from a dealer who, "hangs out down on Alvarado Street, by the Pioneer Chicken stand."

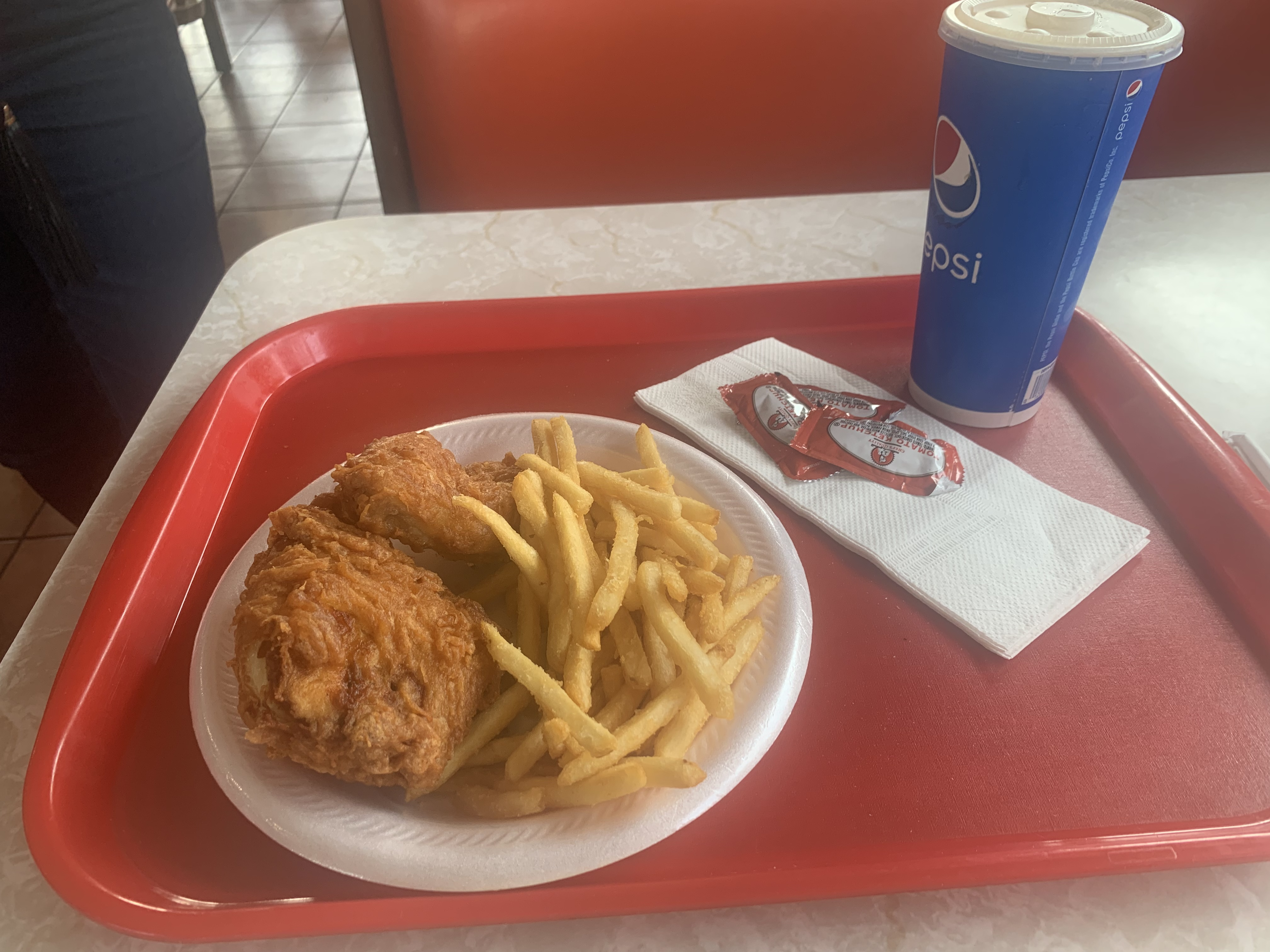
A common meal from the chain.

Pioneer Chicken is remembered for its bright orange deep fried chicken, menu option of gizzards and livers as appetizers, and Pioneer Pete, the company mascot and protagonist in comic books that were provided with their kid's meals.

=== Bankruptcy ===
In 1988 founder H. R. Kaufman and business associate Terrence P. Goggin filed for Chapter 11 in Federal Bankruptcy Court. At that point, Pioneer Chicken had 220 franchise owners and 270 stores. The company faltered under competition pressure from Kentucky Fried Chicken.

=== AFC Enterprises acquisition ===
In 1993, Popeyes Chicken & Biscuits owner AFC Enterprises purchased the franchise and converted most locations to Popeyes.

== Locations ==
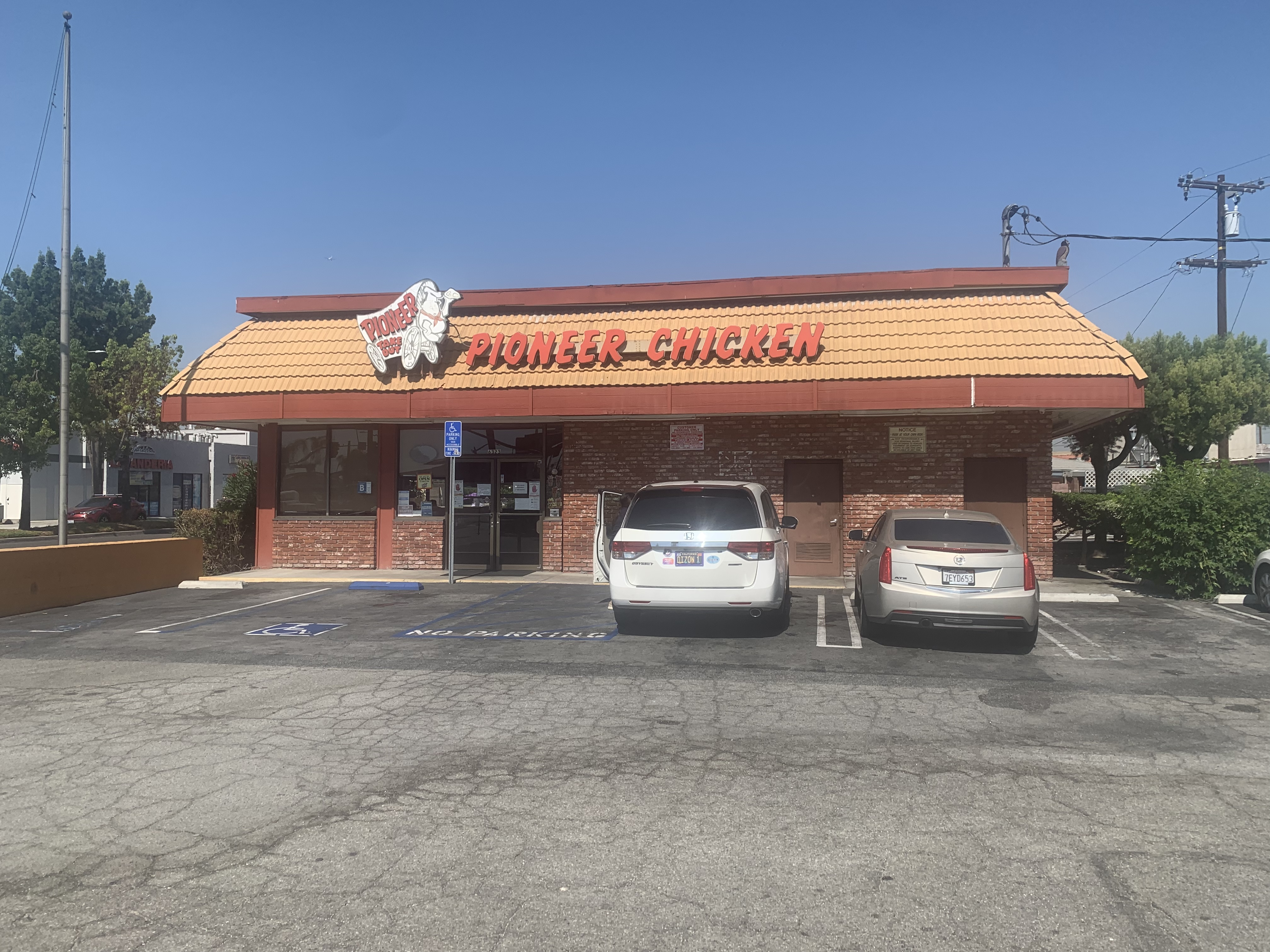
One of the last two operating locations of the chain.

There are two remaining locations in the Los Angeles area: 904 South Soto Street in Los Angeles and 6323 East Florence Avenue in Bell Gardens.

=== Indonesia ===
In 1983, three Indonesian alumni from the University of Southern California decided to open a Pioneer Chicken franchise in Jakarta under the name California Fried Chicken.

As of 2013, the parent company of the stores in Indonesia, Pioneerindo Gourmet International (formerly PT Putra Sejahtera Pioneerindo), have over 200 CFC restaurants throughout that nation. CFC had a few franchises in Shanghai during the 1990s, but they may not currently exist.

== See also ==
- List of fast-food chicken restaurants
