= Australian Homemade =

Dutch chocolate, coffee and ice cream brand

- Current owner: Copar B.V.
- Country: Netherlands
- Introduced: 1989 (as Australian Home Made Ice Cream)
- Markets: Europe; North America
- Website: www.australianhomemade.com

Australian Homemade (branded as Australian) is a Dutch brand of coffee, chocolate and ice cream owned by Copar B.V., a confectionery distributor based in Raamsdonksveer, Netherlands. The brand markets organic coffee and hand-made chocolates using certified cocoa and coffee beans, and is known for confectionery decorated with motifs inspired by Indigenous Australian art.

== History ==
=== Belgian origins ===
Originally, a Belgian ice-cream store named Australian opened in Knokke, set up by the Flemish businessman Frederik Van Isacker. The shop subsequently expanded to many locations within the country. It continues to trade domestically under separate ownership, operating more than forty branded outlets in Belgium.

=== Development as a Dutch brand ===
In the mid-1990s, a separate Dutch brand, marketed as "Australian Homemade" or simply "Australian", was developed to sell chocolates and ice cream using recipes and branding derived from the Belgian business but managed from the Netherlands.

By the early 2000s, Australian Homemade had expanded through franchising, opening branded outlets across continental Europe and in parts of the Asia-Pacific region. In 2003, the brand opened a shop in New York.

=== Shift to packaged products and Copar ownership ===
From the 2010s the brand increasingly shifted from running its own ice-cream parlours towards supplying branded chocolate and coffee products to supermarkets, online retail and business customers in the Netherlands. Its product range was broadened to include organic coffee beans, coffee capsules and gift assortments of chocolates, alongside seasonal confectionery for holidays such as Sinterklaas and Easter.

In 2022 Australian became part of the portfolio of Copar B.V., a Dutch distributor of confectionery brands.

There are currently over 50 stores found in the Netherlands, Germany, Spain, and the United States.

== Aboriginal reaction ==
Some Indigenous Australians reacted with anger at Australian Homemade, accusing them of cultural appropriation through their use of Aboriginal designs without permission.

In defence, the company says the designs were by a Dutch artist inspired by indigenous art and had no intention of causing offence to Indigenous Australians. They were reportedly working with the Aboriginal and Torres Strait Islander Commission to help promote Aboriginal issues.

== See also ==
- Chocolaterie
- Foreign branding
