= New Yorker (clothing) =

German clothing retailer

- Type: Private company
- Industry: Clothing; Retail
- Founded: 1971; 55 years ago
- Headquarters: Braunschweig, Germany
- Key people: Friedrich Knapp, Chairman & CEO
- Products: Wear; Accessories
- Website: newyorker.de

New Yorker, legally New Yorker Group Services International GmbH & Co.KG, is a German clothing retailer headquartered in Braunschweig.

New Yorker's flagship store in Braunschweig.

In 1971 the first New Yorker store was opened in Flensburg. In December 2006, the company achieved the first billion in sales. By November 2022, the company owned 1,150 branches in 47 countries: Albania, Armenia, Azerbaijan, Austria, Bahrain, Belarus, Belgium, Bosnia and Herzegovina, Bulgaria, Croatia, Czech Republic, Denmark, Egypt, Estonia, Finland, France, Georgia, Germany, Hungary, Iceland, Italy, Kazakhstan, Kosovo, Latvia, Lithuania, Luxembourg, Macedonia, Moldova, Montenegro, Morocco, Netherlands, Norway, Poland, Portugal, Qatar, Romania, Russia, Saudi Arabia, Serbia, Slovakia, Slovenia, Spain, Sweden, Switzerland, Ukraine, and United Arab Emirates.

In March 2012 Olly Murs became the face for New Yorker's men spring/summer range and customers were able to get their photos taken with a cardboard cut-out of Murs.

The company has over 23,000 employees. New Yorker is naming sponsor of the Braunschweig-based German Football League team New Yorker Lions and formerly also the Basketball Bundesliga team New Yorker Phantoms Braunschweig (now Basketball Löwen Braunschweig). The company also sponsors the international b-boy competition Battle of the Year.

== History ==
It all began in 1971, when Tilmar Hansen and Michael Simson opened the first New Yorker branch in downtown Flensburg, which at the time was just a simple jeans shop. A little later, Friedrich Knapp who later became managing director and also managed a denim store in Braunschweig at the time, joined the company. The three eventually founded SHK-Jeans GmbH and opened their first branches throughout Germany in the 1970s and 1980s. In 1990, Simson left the company and was only associated as the owner of a few properties in which New Yorker branches were located. In 1994, the first step across the German border was made. At that time, the two entrepreneurs opened the first foreign branch in Linz, Austria. Once abroad, the company continued to expand rapidly. Beginning in 1998 with the addition of stores in Czech Republic and Poland, as of 2022 the chain spans almost 50 countries and 3 continents.

== Criticism ==
In February 2015, the company was accused of attempting to prevent the establishment of works councils. Frankfurter Rundschau reported that after a works council was established at a store in Offenbach am Main, the company spun off that location into a separate subsidiary, which was subsequently liquidated.

In November 2017, the Süddeutsche Zeitung reported that Friedrich Knapp, the sole owner of New Yorker, was mentioned in the Paradise Papers. The newspaper described email correspondence regarding the establishment of a Cayman Islands-based aircraft leasing company, which, "for German tax reasons", would hold and lease the company's jets.

New Yorker has faced criticism from sustainability assessment organizations regarding its supply chain transparency. The independent brand rating platform Good On You assigned New Yorker its lowest overall rating, "We Avoid", stating that the company provides insufficient information about its environmental and social impacts and lacks transparency regarding measures taken throughout its supply chain. In addition, New Yorker was among the brands that received a score of 0% in the 2021 Fashion Transparency Index published by Fashion Revolution, which evaluates the extent to which major fashion companies publicly disclose information about their social and environmental policies, practices and supply chains.

== Stores ==
Country	Number of stores
Germany	290
Austria	91
Poland	89
Russia	74
Czech Republic	71
France	51
Romania	45
Hungary	37
Switzerland	34
Slovakia	34
Spain	29
Netherlands	28
Bulgaria	28
Sweden	26
Croatia	24
Finland	21
Serbia	20
Saudi Arabia	19
Slovenia	18
Ukraine	15
Bosnia and Herzegovina	13
Estonia	11
Norway	11
Italy	10
Latvia	9
Portugal	8
Belgium	7
Kazakhstan	7
Lithuania	7
Azerbaijan	6
Denmark	5
Georgia	6
Montenegro	7
Armenia	4
Belarus	3
Egypt	3
Kosovo	8
Luxembourg	3
North Macedonia	9
Morocco	3
Qatar	4
United Arab Emirates	4
Iceland	2
Albania	2
Moldova	1
Malta	1
Oman	1
Bahrain	2

== Gallery ==
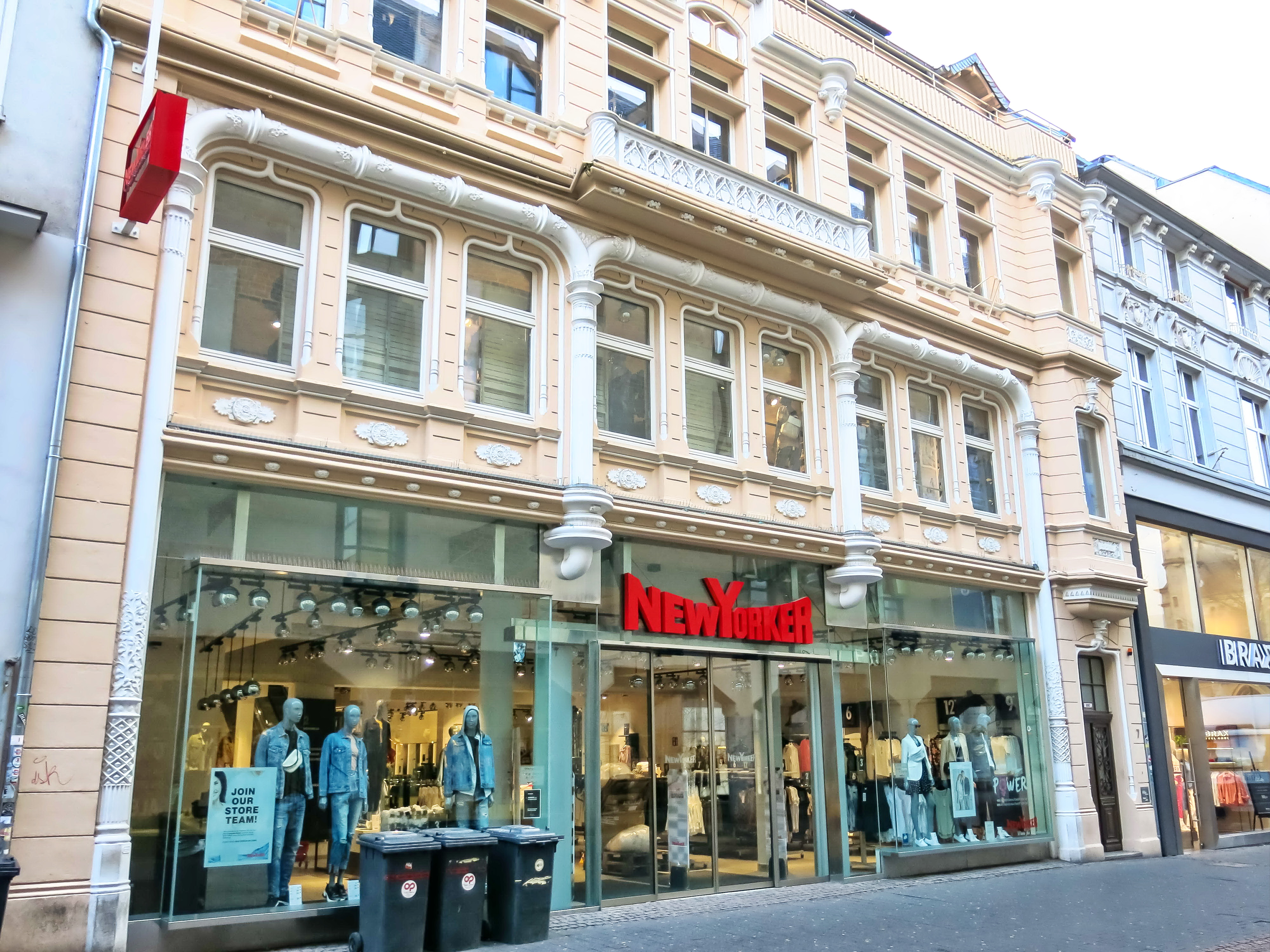
A New Yorker store in Bonn, Germany.

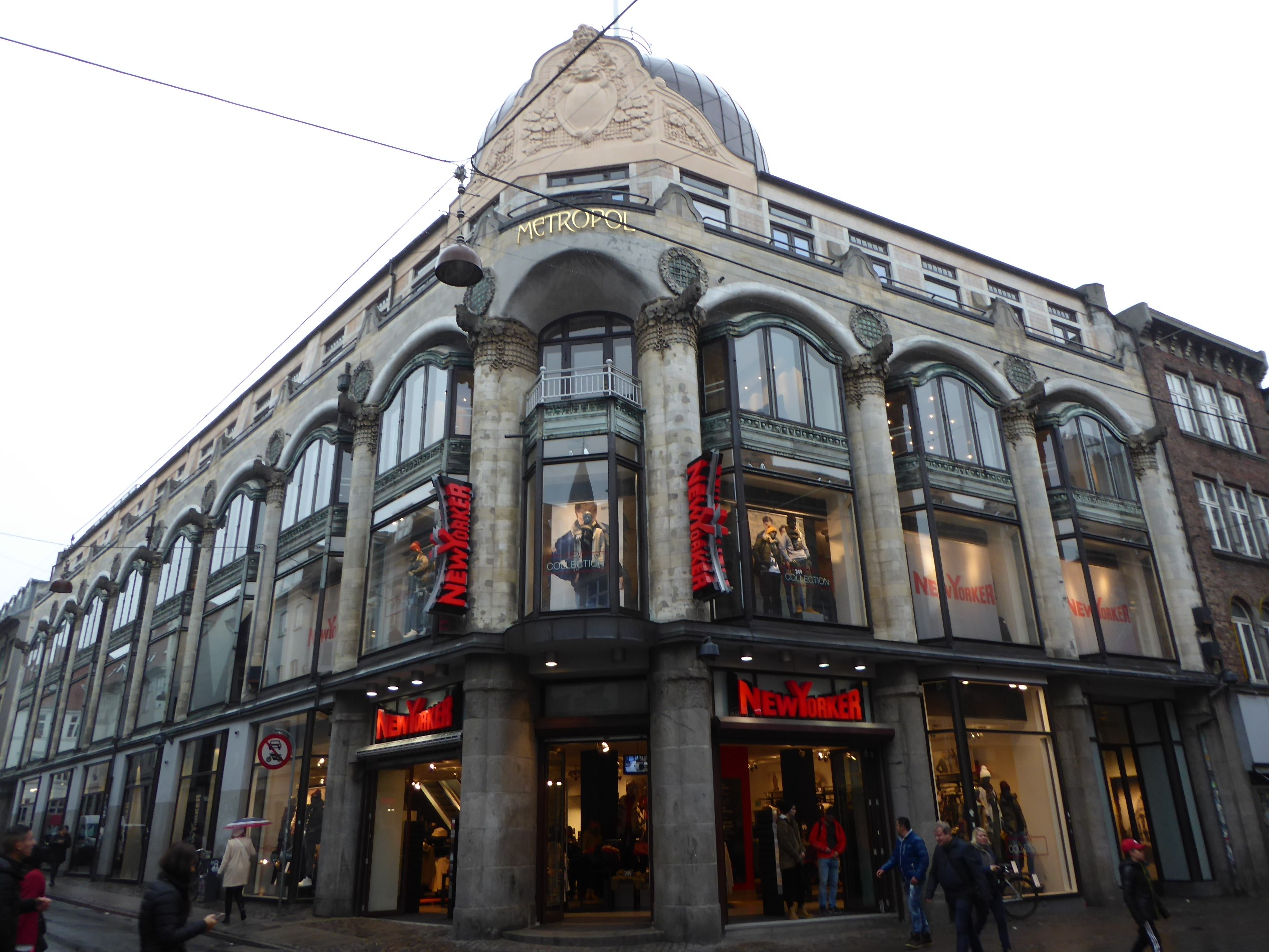
A New Yorker store in Copenhagen, Denmark.

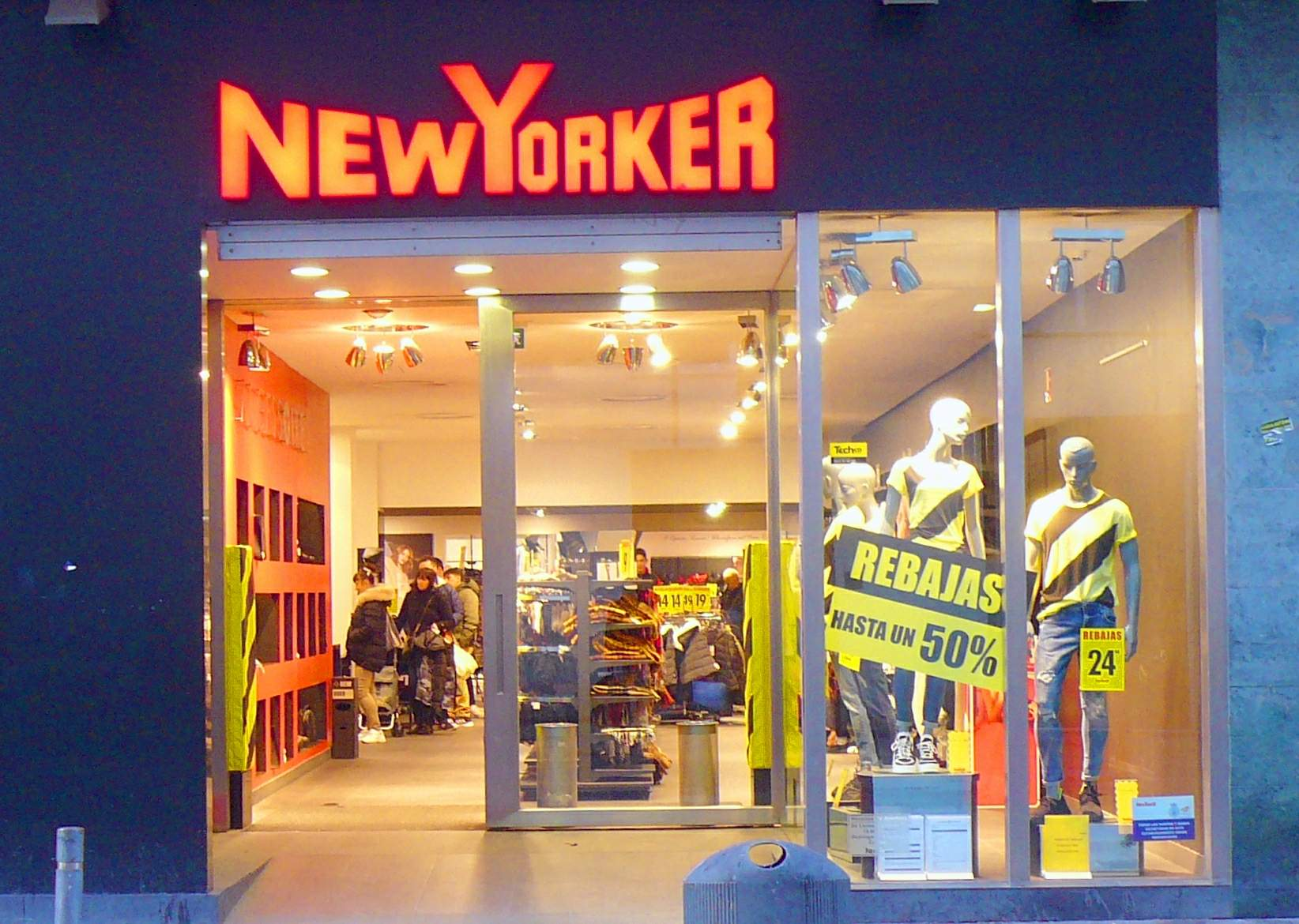
A New Yorker store in Vitoria-Gasteiz, Spain.

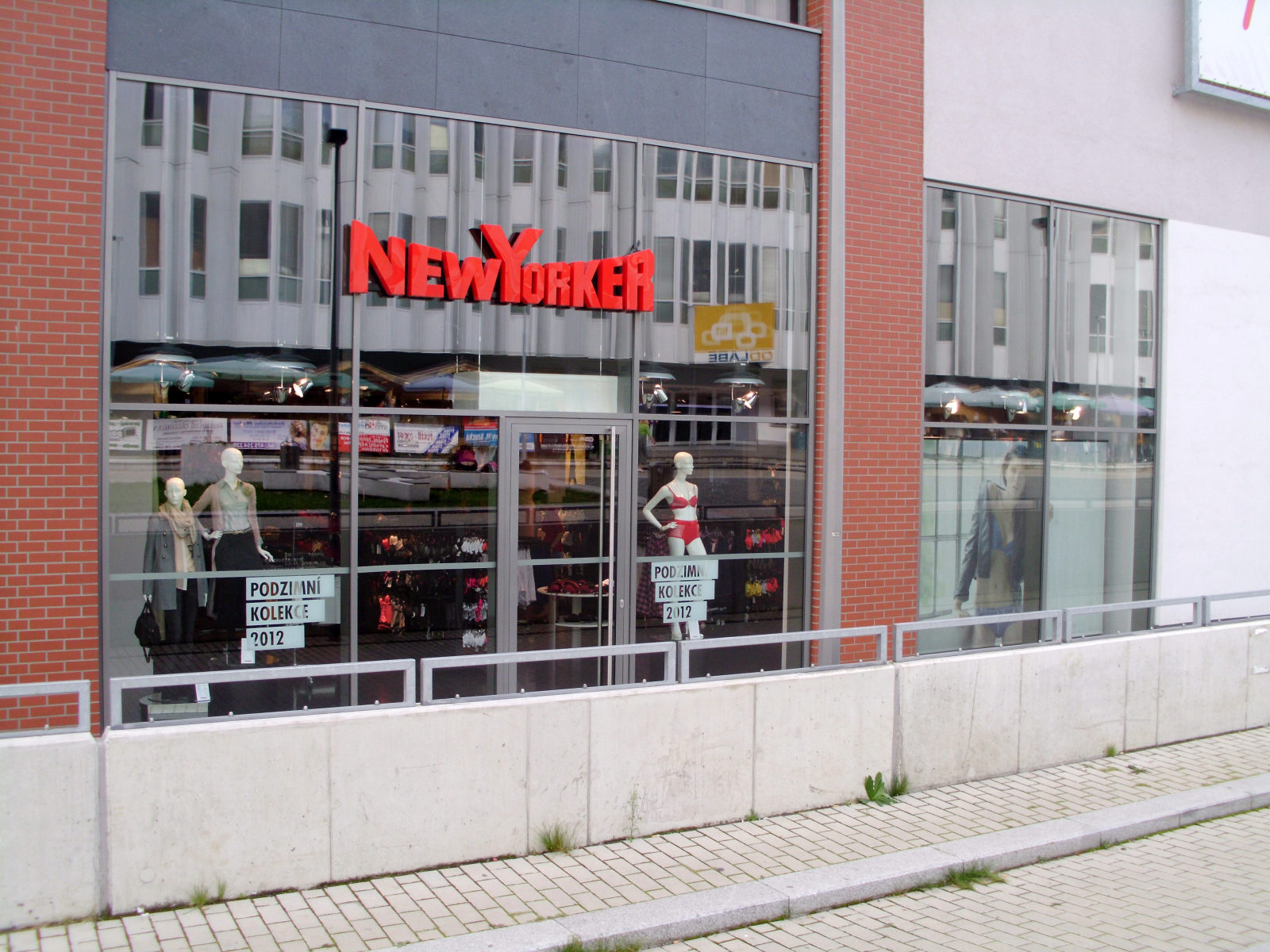
A New Yorker store in Ústí nad Labem, Czech Republic.

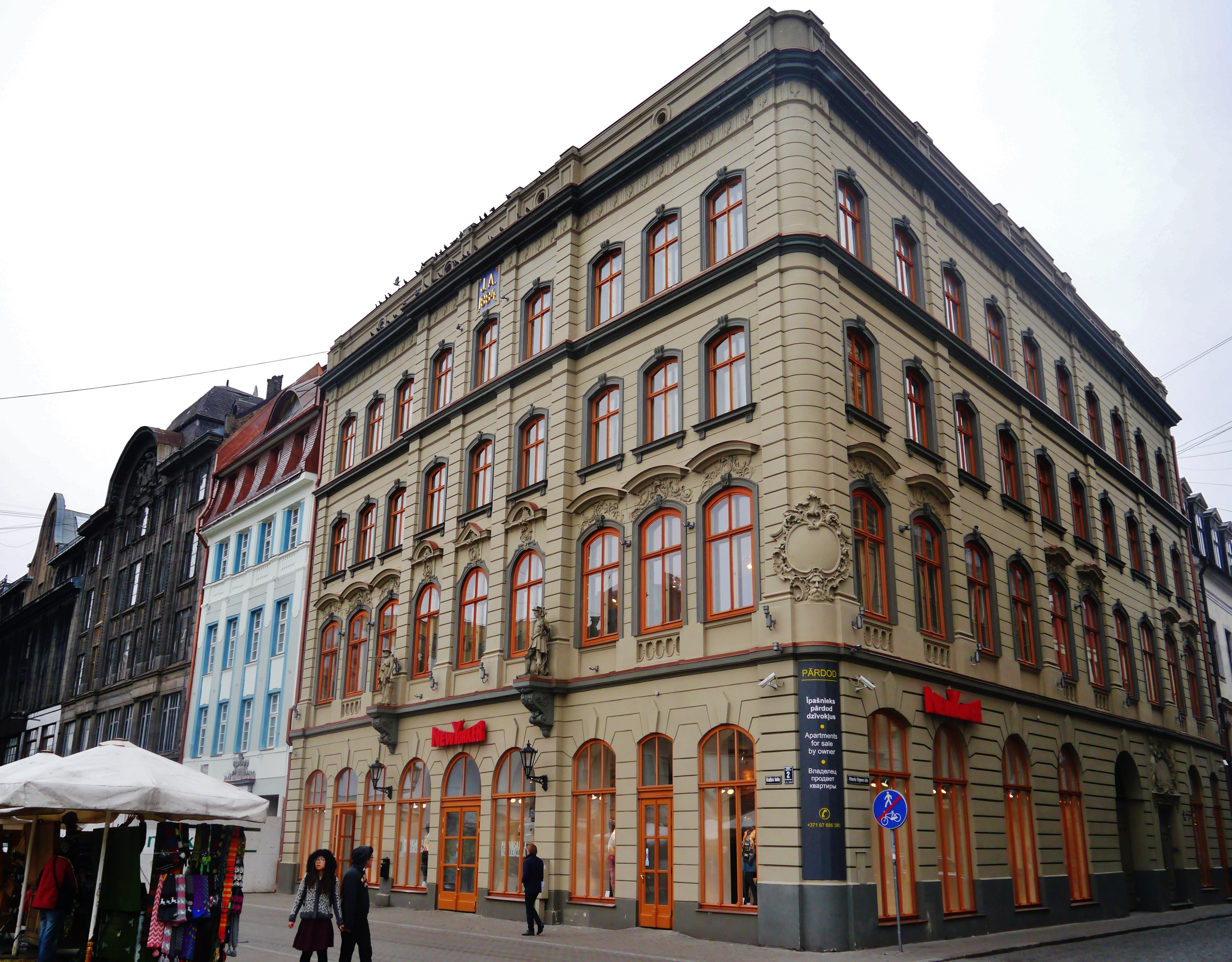
A New Yorker store in Riga, Latvia.

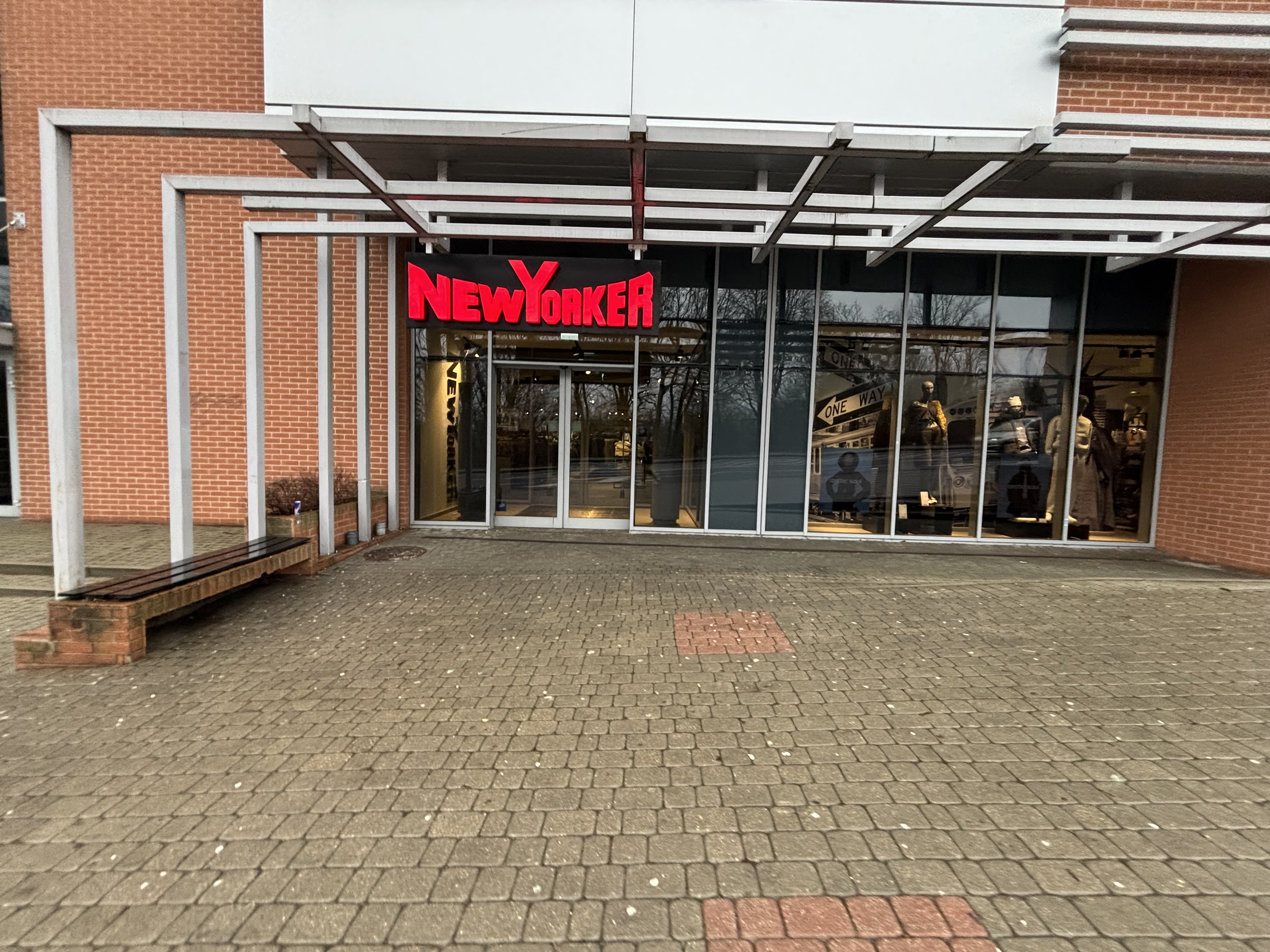
A New Yorker store in Olsztyn, Poland.

== See also ==
- Foreign branding
