= Häagen-Dazs =

American ice cream brand

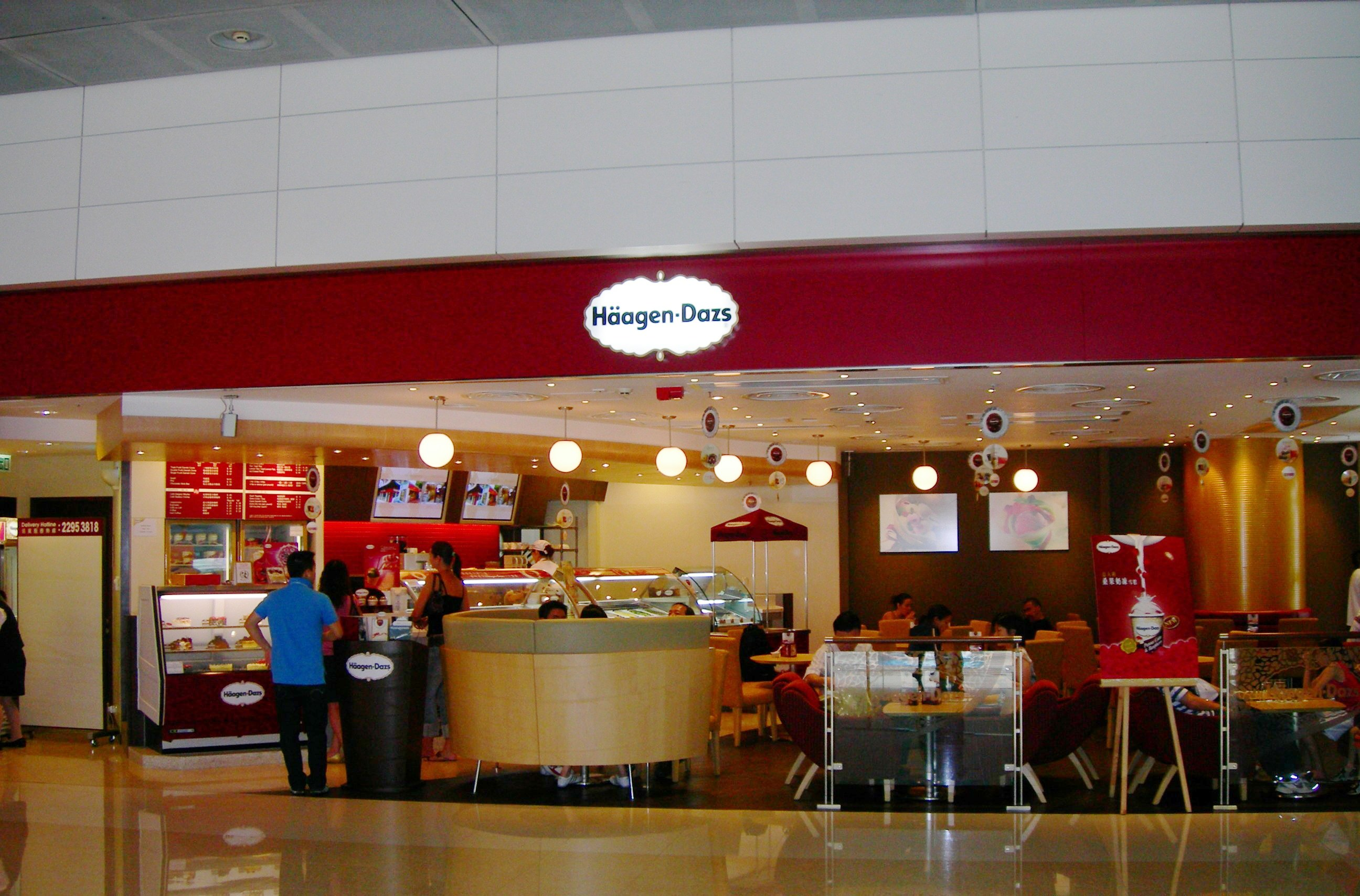
- Häagen-Dazs cafe in Hong Kong
- Type: Subsidiary
- Industry: Retail Franchising
- Founded: 1960; 66 years ago in The Bronx, New York City, U.S.
- Founder: Reuben and Rose Mattus
- Headquarters: Minneapolis, Minnesota, U.S.
- Number of locations: 900+
- Area served: Worldwide
- Products: Ice cream
- Services: Pillsbury (brand)
- Owners: Froneri (United States and Canada); General Mills (International)
- Divisions: Häagen-Dazs Canada
- Website: www.icecream.com/us/en/brands/haagen-dazs

Häagen-Dazs (US: /ˈhɑːɡəndæs/ HAH-gən-dass, UK: /ˌhɑːɡənˈdɑːz/ HAH-gən-DAHZ) is an American ice cream brand, established by Polish-Americans Reuben and Rose Mattus in The Bronx in 1960, owned by General Mills and licensed royalty-free and exclusively to Froneri, a joint venture between Nestlé and PAI Partners, in the United States and Canada. General Mills manages and operates the Häagen-Dazs business outside of North America. Starting with only three flavors: vanilla, chocolate, and coffee, the company opened its first retail store in Brooklyn, on November 15, 1976. The Pillsbury food conglomerate bought Häagen-Dazs in 1983, and now the brand is sold worldwide. Their product offerings include ice cream cartons, ice cream bars, ice cream cakes, sorbet, frozen yogurt, frozen milkshake, gelato, and ice cream sandwiches.

== History ==
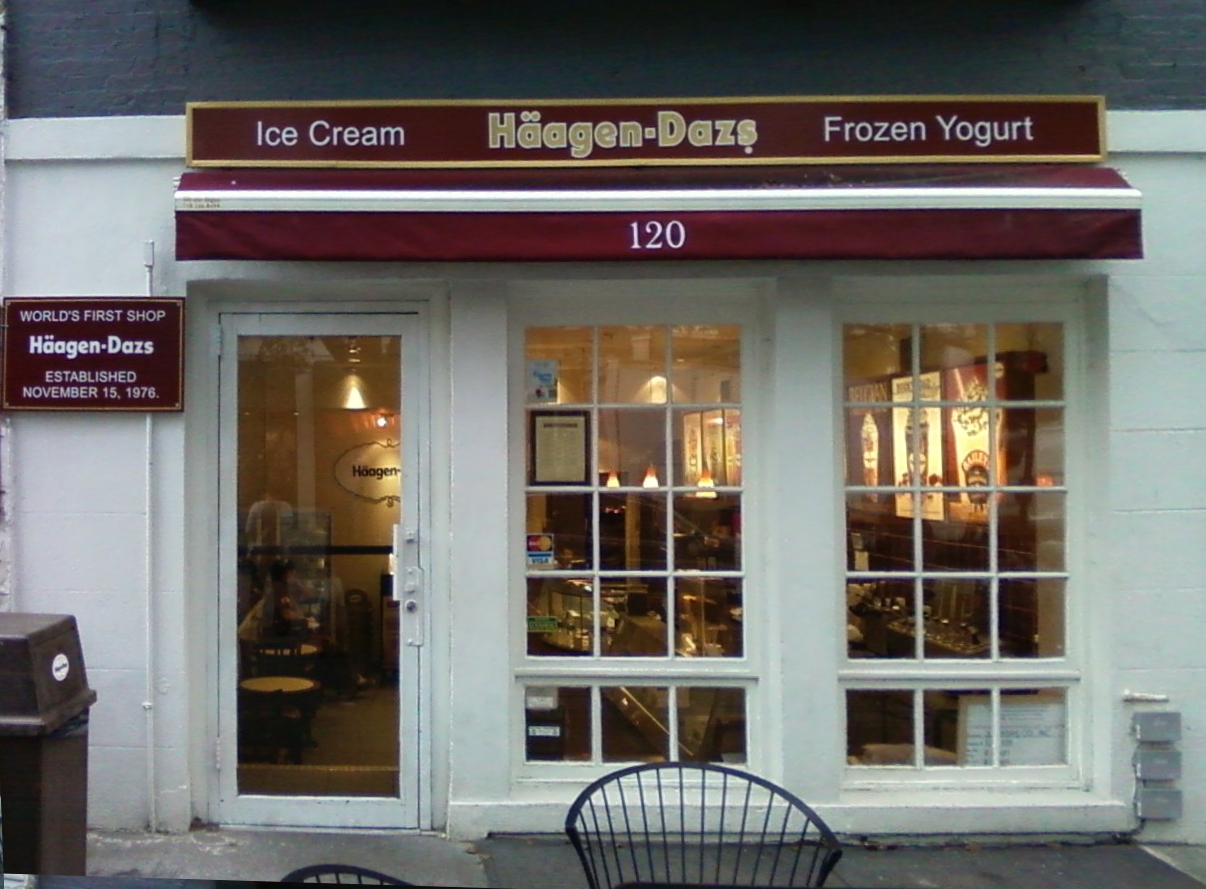
Häagen-Dazs' first store at 120 Montague Street, Brooklyn, New York

Häagen-Dazs's co-founder Reuben Mattus was born in Poland in 1912 to Jewish parents. His father died during World War I, and his widowed mother migrated to New York City with her two children in 1921. They joined an uncle who was in the Italian lemon-ice business in Brooklyn. By the late 1920s, the family began making ice pops, and by 1929, chocolate-covered ice cream bars and sandwiches under the name Senator Frozen Products on Southern Boulevard in the South Bronx, delivering them with a horse-drawn wagon to neighborhood stores in the Bronx.

The Senator Frozen Products company was profitable, but by the 1950s the large mass-producers of ice cream started a price war, leading to Mattus' decision to make a heavy kind of high-end ice cream. In 1959, he decided to form a new ice cream company with what he thought to be a Danish-sounding name, Häagen-Dazs, as a tribute to Denmark's exemplary treatment of Jews during World War II, a move known in the marketing industry as foreign branding. His wife, Rose Mattus, would dress up in fancy clothing to distribute free samples, giving the ice cream an air of sophistication and class.

The Pillsbury Company bought Häagen-Dazs in 1983. In 1999, Pillsbury and Nestlé merged their U.S. and Canadian ice cream operations into a joint venture called Ice Cream Partners. General Mills, in turn, bought Pillsbury in 2001 and succeeded to its interest in the joint venture. That same year, Nestlé exercised its contractual right to buy out General Mills' interest in Ice Cream Partners, which included the right to a 99-year license for the Häagen-Dazs brand, until 2110. Since then, pursuant to that license, the Dreyer's subsidiary of Nestlé has produced and marketed Häagen-Dazs products in the United States and Canada. In December 2019, Nestlé sold Dreyer's along with its rights in the Häagen-Dazs brand to Froneri, a joint venture set up by Nestlé and PAI Partners in 2016.

== Origin of brand name ==
"Häagen-Dazs" is an invented pseudo-Scandinavian phrase coined by the Polish-American Reuben Mattus, in a quest for a brand name that he claimed was Danish-sounding. However, the letter "ä" and the digraph "zs" do not exist in Danish. (Note: The term does not exist in the Danish or any other known language; and Danish has neither an umlaut ä (the ligature æ is the corresponding counterpart; ä is used in Swedish orthography) nor the zs digraph (the digraph zs exists only in Hungarian, and represents the voiced postalveolar fricative ʒ, a sound which does not exist natively in Scandinavian languages, and would be represented only in loanwords and according to the source language's orthography, such as the English zh or the French j); the umlaut is typical of German while the digraph is typical of Hungarian. Applying the rules of German and Hungarian orthography to the first and second word respectively would result in the pronunciations [ˈhɛːaɡn̩] and [ˈdɒʒ]. In Norwegian "hagen" (cognate with Danish "haven") means "the garden" while "das" or "dass" (zs would be pronounced identically to s under the orthographic rules of the Nordic languages) is a coarse slang term for an outhouse or in modern usage sometimes also a modern toilet in all the Scandinavian languages, a loan word derived from the German definite article das, originally from the German expression das Häuschen (the small house, i.e. the outhouse), by euphemistic omission of the main word; thus, in the Scandinavian languages Häagen-Dazs would be most reminiscent of a grammatically incorrect way of saying "the garden outhouse" with Hungarian- and German-looking extra letters and digraphs.) According to Mattus, it was a tribute to Denmark's exemplary treatment of its Jews during the Second World War, and included an outline map of Denmark on early labels. Mattus felt that Denmark was also known for its dairy products and had a positive image in the United States. His daughter Doris Hurley reported in the 1996 PBS documentary An Ice Cream Show that her father sat at the kitchen table for hours saying nonsensical words until he came up with a combination he liked. The reason he chose this method was so that the name would be unique and original.

=== Conflict with Frusen Glädjé ===
In 1980, Häagen-Dazs unsuccessfully sued Frusen Glädjé, an American ice cream maker founded that year, for using foreign branding strategies. The phrase frusen glädje—without the acute accent—is Swedish for "frozen joy". In 1985, Frusen Glädjé was sold to Kraft General Foods. A Kraft spokeswoman stated that Kraft sold its Frusen Glädjé license to the Unilever corporation in 1993, but a spokesman for Unilever said that Frusen Glädjé was not part of the deal. The brand has since been discontinued.

== Products ==
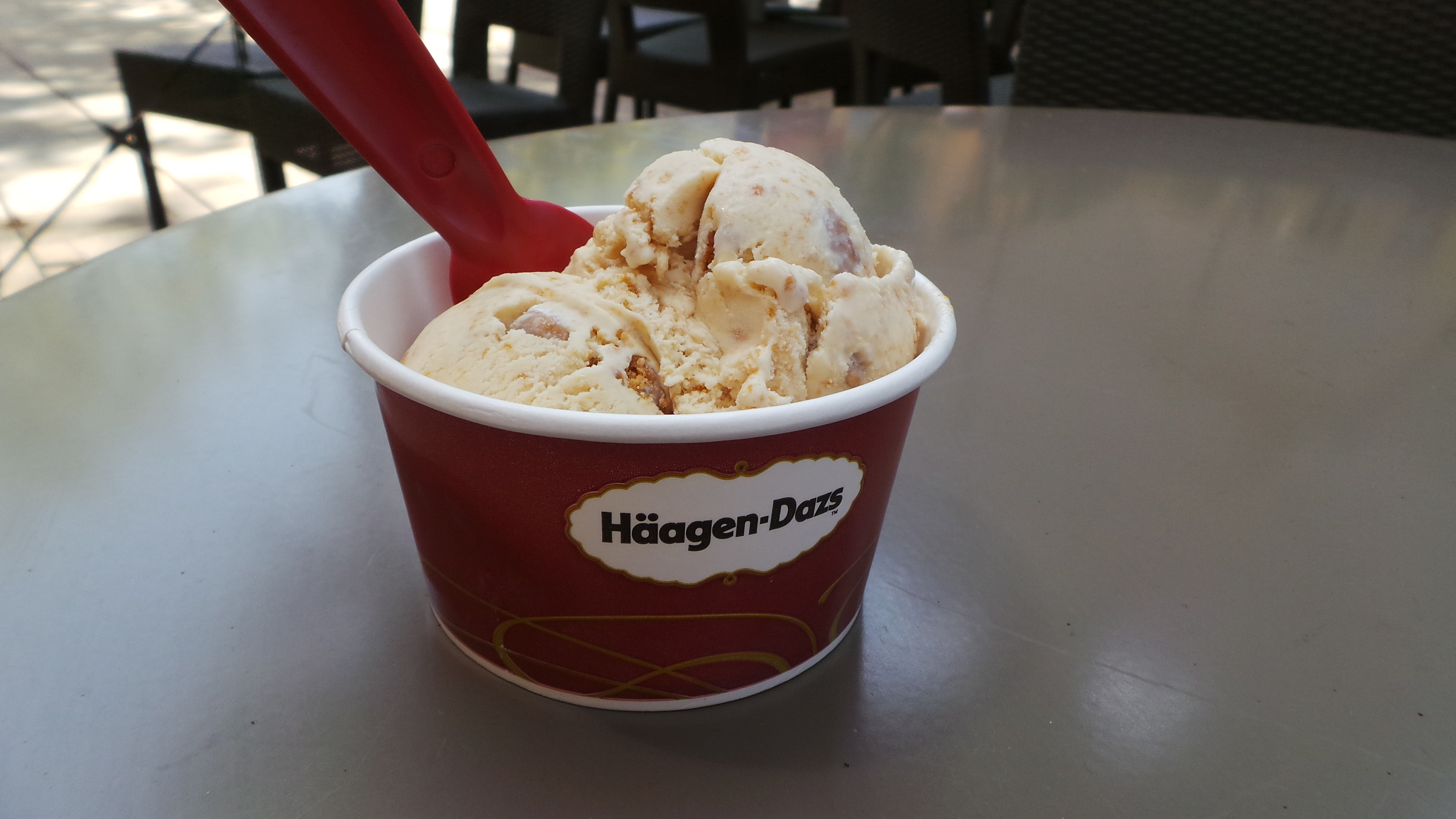
Pralines & Cream Häagen-Dazs

Häagen-Dazs ice cream comes in several traditional flavors as well as several esoteric flavors that are specific to the brand, such as Vanilla Swiss Almond and Rum Raisin. It is marketed as a "super-premium" brand: it is quite dense (very little air is mixed in during manufacturing), uses no emulsifiers or stabilizers other than egg yolks, and has a high butterfat content. It is sold both in grocery stores and in dedicated retail outlets serving ice cream cones, sundaes, and so on.

Since 1992, most of the world's Häagen-Dazs products have been manufactured at a plant in Tilloy-lès-Mofflaines, France that is now controlled by General Mills. In the United States and Canada, Häagen-Dazs is licensed to and produced by Froneri. Häagen-Dazs entered the Japanese market in 1984 by forming a joint venture with Suntory and Takanashi Milk, which has produced their products there ever since. The factory is located in Takasaki, Gunma Prefecture, Japan.

To offset increasing ingredient and delivery costs, Häagen-Dazs downsized their pint ice cream cartons (16 US fl oz; 470 ml) in the US to 14 US fl oz (410 ml) in January 2009. In March 2009, they announced that they would be downsizing their quart cartons (32 US fl oz; 950 ml) to 28 US fl oz (830 ml).

== See also ==
- List of ice cream parlor chains
