= Plopp =

Swedish chocolate bar

One unwrapped and two wrapped Plopp bars.

Plopp is a chocolate bar manufactured by the Swedish company Cloetta (formerly part of Cloetta Fazer). Like Center, another Cloetta chocolate bar, it consists of milk chocolate with a soft caramel center, but the formula, texture and aroma are not the same. Over 95 percent of Plopp bars are sold in Sweden.

Some English-speaking sources have criticized the name "Plopp" as being unappealing due to its use as a euphemism for human feces.

== History ==
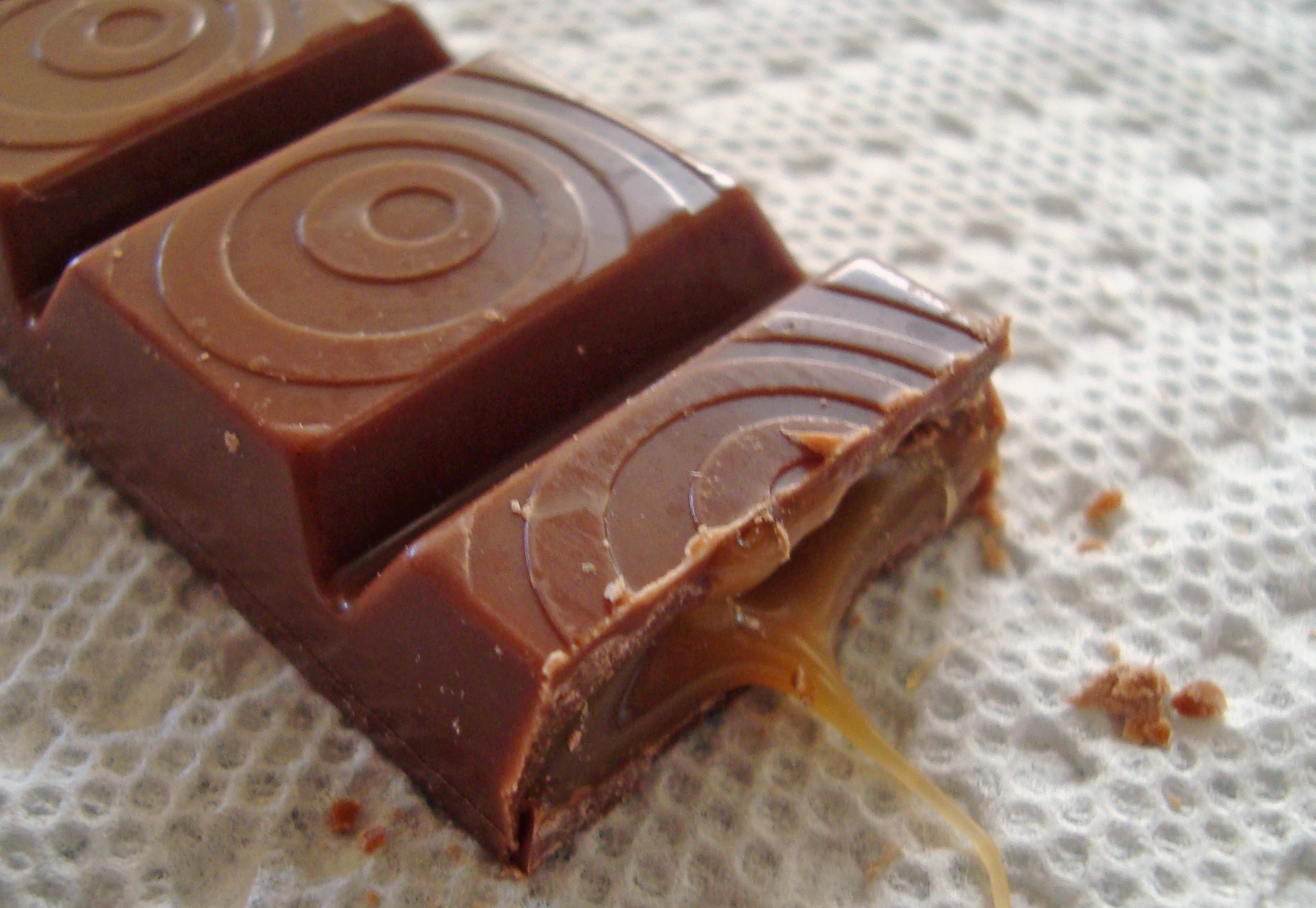
Close-up of a Plopp bar.

Plopp was created in 1949 as a small bar. A larger version was introduced in 1974, a stick version in 1992, and a roll version with individual pieces in 1995. Plopp Lakrits (liquorice) was released in the early 1980s to Sweden only, but in 1999 in celebration of the candy's 50th anniversary it became available worldwide.

More recently several new flavors have been released: Plopp Currant in 2004, Plopp Caffe Latte in 2006, Plopp Tutti Frutti in 2008, and Plopp Saltlakrits (salty liquorice) in 2009. The candy also received a redesign in 2009.
