= Reuben and Rose Mattus =

Polish-Jewish ice cream entrepreneurs

Reuben and Rose Mattus were Polish-American entrepreneurs who founded the Häagen-Dazs ice cream business.

== Biography ==
=== Reuben Mattus ===
Reuben Mattus (December 25, 1912 or January 8, 1913 – January 27, 1994) was born to a Polish–Jewish family in Grodno, at the time part of the Russian Empire. His parents, Lea (also Leah) and Nathan, originally spelt their surname either Mattes or Matus, and had originally named their son Nifka at birth. The family ran a gourmet shop, which struggled financially after the beginning of World War I. Nathan traveled to the United States with plans to relocate the rest of the family there, but he was conscripted into the Imperial Russian Army upon returning to Russian Poland to bring his wife and children back with him. During the war, Nathan was killed in the Battle of Tannenberg while the rest of the family struggled with food shortages, with Reuben's mother Lea and older sister Eleanor contracting typhus. By the end of the war, Grodno became part of the Second Polish Republic, and after the family recovered from typhus, Lea reopened the gourmet shop.

In 1921, relatives in the U.S. financed the immigration of Reuben's family, who arrived at the Port of New York on the SS Vestris on March 5, 1921. On Ellis Island, their surname was changed to Mattus. Two of Reuben's uncles already ran separate ice cream businesses, Big Bear Ice Cream and Yukon Ice Cream Company, with his mother starting a third business, Sanitary Frozen Products, in the Bronx. Beginning at the age of 10, Reuben worked at an ice cream parlor run by his uncle in Brooklyn and also helped his mother make Italian lemon-ice, operating the hand-crank machine to squeeze the lemon juice for the ice. When Lea Mattus incorporated her business, she renamed it to Senator Frozen Products, Inc. due to a communication error with her lawyer. By 1929, the family was making ice pops, chocolate-covered ice cream bars and ice cream sandwiches, selling them around South Bronx from a horse-drawn wagon.

=== Rose Mattus (née Vesel) ===
Rose Vesel Mattus (November 23, 1916 – November 28, 2006) was born in Manchester, Lancashire, United Kingdom, as Riva Rochel Vesel to Polish Jewish parents Lily (née Grochowsky) and David Vesel, who had left their native Poland after eloping from their families. Following their daughter's birth, the Vesel family moved to Belfast in Ulster, where they produced costumes for a theatre company. After the factory where Rose's parents worked was bombed during the Irish War of Independence, the family emigrated to New York as steerage passengers aboard the RMS Berengaria in October 1921, when Rose was five years old.

== Häagen-Dazs ==
Reuben and Rose met in New York City's Brownsville neighborhood, where both lived on the same street. After finishing high school, Rose went to work as a bookkeeper at the Senator plant in 1934, and the two married in 1936. The Senator Frozen Products company was profitable, but by the 1950s the large mass-producers of ice cream started a price war leading to their decision to make a heavy kind of high-end ice cream. Reuben consulted some books and started to make a new heavy kind of ice cream. In 1959, they decided to form a new ice cream company with a foreign-sounding name. The name chosen was the Danish-sounding 'Häagen-Dazs' as a tribute to Denmark's exemplary treatment of its Jews during the Second World War, adding an umlaut which does not exist in Danish, and even put a map of Denmark on the carton.

From its launch in 1961, the ice cream was made using cream and natural ingredients for the flavorings, in contrast with competing brands which used often artificial ingredients. They started with three simple flavors: vanilla, chocolate, and coffee. Their ice cream was high in butterfat and had less air, which, according to Rose Mattus' autobiography, was the result of a factory accident, when the air injection pump broke. Reuben developed the flavors and Rose marketed the product. Her first marketing ploy was to dress up elegantly – in keeping with the upmarket positioning of the brand – and give away free samples at local grocers. Another part of her strategy was to market the brand to university students, and she made certain that ice cream parlors near New York University in Greenwich Village carried Häagen-Dazs, as well as upscale restaurants. The brand, which grew only slowly through the 1960s, was at first distributed nationally by Greyhound Bus deliveries to college towns. In 1966, Häagen-Dazs launched its fourth flavor, strawberry, a flavor that took them 6 years to develop. By 1973, it was sold throughout the United States, and in 1976 the first Häagen-Dazs store was opened in Brooklyn by their daughter Doris.

The business was sold to the Pillsbury Company in 1983 for $70 million. The Mattuses were kept on as consultants after the sale until Pillsbury was bought by Grand Metropolitan and their contract was not renewed; Häagen-Dazs was then owned by General Mills. After this, they launched the Mattus Ice Cream Company in 1992, this time specializing in low-fat products, calling them Mattus' Lowfat Ice Cream, a premium line of low-fat ice cream. Mattus' Lowfat Ice Cream was named one of the "Ten Best Products of 1993" by Time Magazine.

== Personal life ==
The Mattuses lived in Cresskill, New Jersey. They had two daughters, Doris Hurley and Natalie Salmore, and five grandchildren.

In 1982, Reuben and Rose Mattus received the Golden Plate Award of the American Academy of Achievement.

=== Activism ===
Rose Mattus sat on the board of the Zionist Organization of America. The couple was known for their support of Rabbi Meir Kahane, founder of the Jewish Defense League and the Kach party. They were known for their support of Israel, founding a school of high technology in Herzliya which bears their name, and supporting the Israeli settlements.

=== Death ===
Reuben Mattus died on January 30, 1994, after suffering a heart attack. Rose Mattus died in Westwood, New Jersey on November 28, 2006.
