= California Fried Chicken =

Indonesian fast food restaurant

CFC
- Type: Wholly owned subsidiary
- Industry: Restaurants
- Founded: 1983; 43 years ago
- Headquarters: Jakarta, Indonesia
- Number of locations: 358 (2026)
- Products: Fried chicken, pizza, pastries, fried noodles
- Parent: PT Pioneerindo Gourmet International Tbk.
- Website: cfcindonesia.com

California Fried Chicken (CFC) is an Indonesian fast food restaurant chain principally serving fried chicken. Its primary competitors are KFC, McDonald's, A&W, and Texas Chicken, and as of March 2026, it runs 358 locations across Indonesia.

== History ==
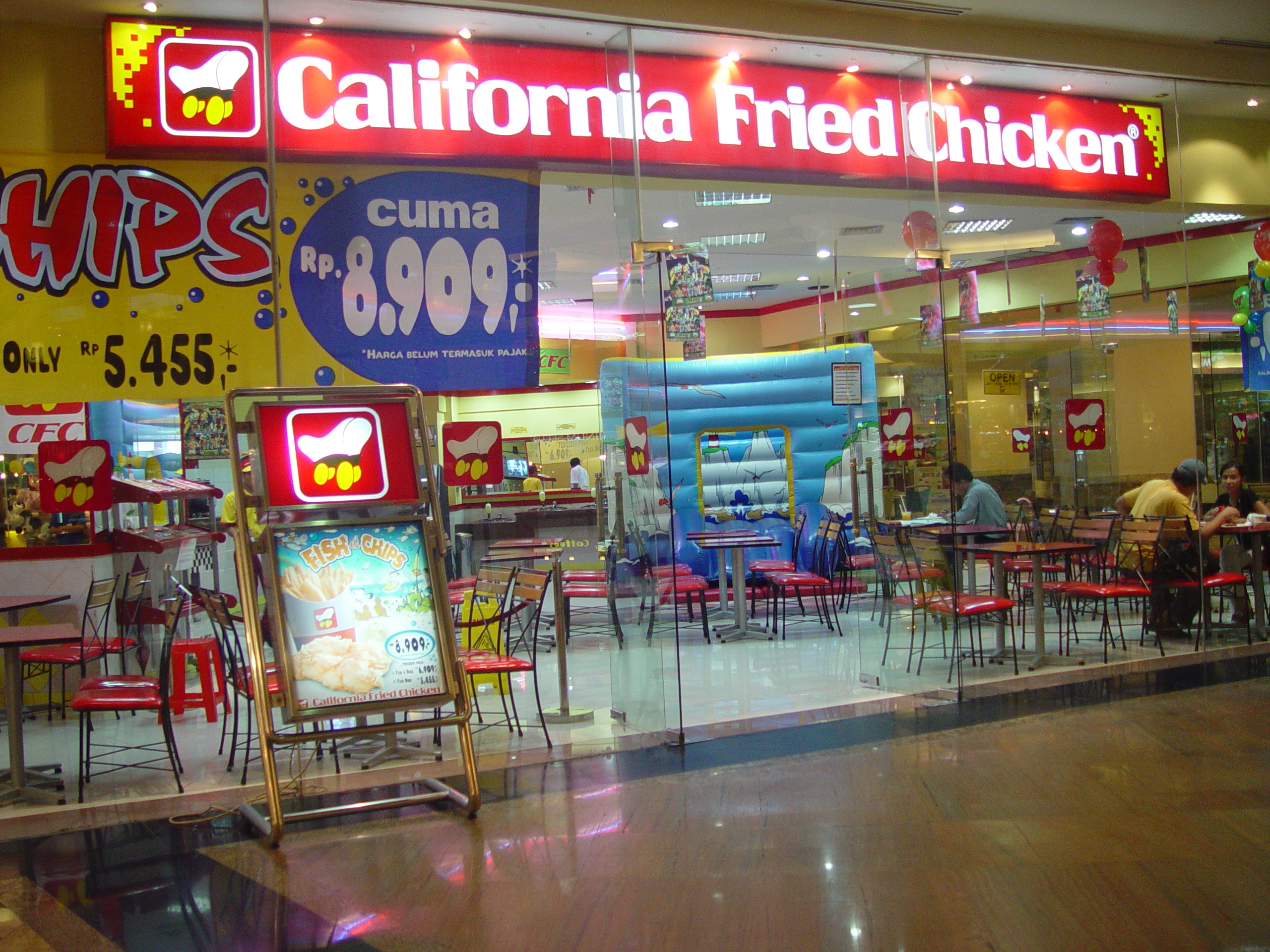
A branch in Jakarta, 2004. Note the use of the old logo.

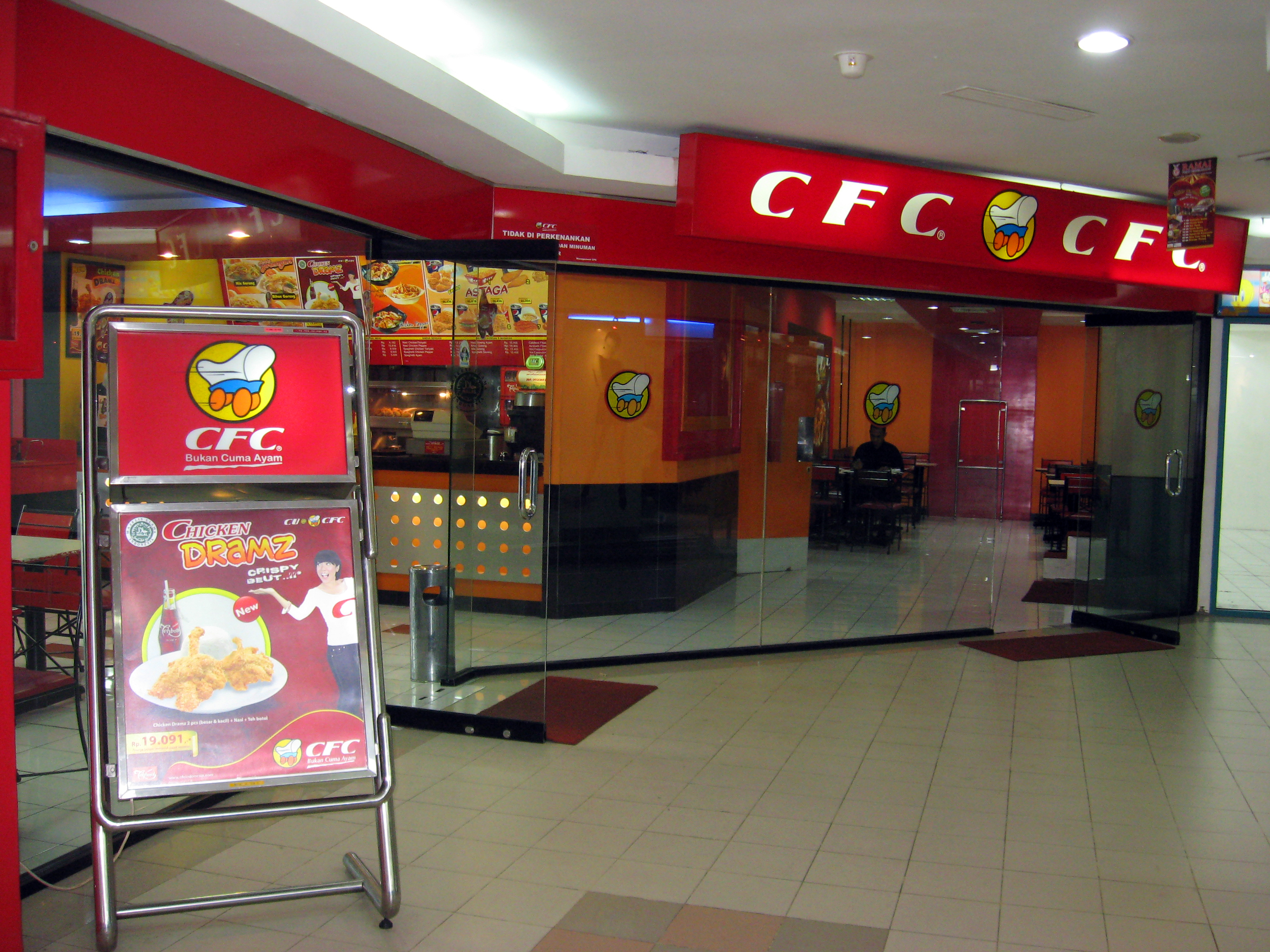
A branch in Yogyakarta, 2011

The chain was established in 1983 in Jakarta as a franchise of the American-based Pioneer Take Out, has an American name and is now entirely Indonesian owned. The same group supplies the chain, the Sierad Group, which also supplies chicken to Wendy's and KFC. Its mascot was Calfred, mainly used in the 1990s.

It is the main PT Pioneerindo Gourmet International Tbk (previously known as PT Putra Sejahtera Pioneerindo until 2001 and was owned by Putra Surya Perkasa group) brand, which was listed on the Jakarta Stock Exchange in 1994. The firm also runs Sapo Oriental and Cal Donat outlets in Jakarta and employs 1,400 people. Studies conducted by the Jakarta Post reveal that it is the fifth most popular fast food chain in Indonesia after Restoran Sederhana, KFC, McDonald's, and Pizza Hut. As the Westernization of Indonesia took off in the 1990s, California Fried Chicken took advantage of the growth of American-style malls in the country, reaching 90 locations by 1998. It is now common to see branches of the chain in malls or near supermarkets, often in direct competition with neighboring branches of the global brands of the above-mentioned and Dunkin' Donuts.

According to an article in Adweek, California Fried Chicken was founded by three Indonesians who wanted to introduce the taste of Pioneer Chicken to their homeland that they had enjoyed during their stay in California while attending the University of Southern California.

The Los Angeles Times mentioned that California Fried Chicken had stores in China during the 1990s. However, these stores do not appear to currently exist.

In 2008, the firm opened new outlets in Salatiga and Central Java, marketed in a way that meets local demands by serving traditional Indonesian food staples of fried noodles and rice with chicken.

== Logo ==
The logo and marketing of California Fried Chicken is very similar to that of a covered wagon. Like the KFC logo, CFC uses red and white with the letters CFC and features a cartoon Old Western white and blue wagon on a yellow circular background. Its advertising slogan was "Bukan Cuma Ayam", a translation of "Not Just Chicken" in the Indonesian language.

== See also ==
- List of fast-food chicken restaurants
