= Touch Dictionary =

2005 Nintendo DS dictionary software

- Developer(s): YBM Sisa
- Publisher(s): Daiwon C&A Holdings
- Platform(s): Nintendo DS
- Release: KOR: July, 2005
- Genre(s): Dictionary
- Mode(s): Single player

Touch Dictionary (터치 딕셔너리, Teochi Diksyeoneori) (formerly known as Touch Dic) is a dictionary software title for the Nintendo DS released in 2005 exclusively in South Korea.

== Features ==
A screenshot of the dictionary interface; this is the Japanese-to-Korean dictionary.

The dictionary offers translation to and from English, Japanese, and Korean. An advertisement for the game claims it offers 1.63 million words.

The user enters the word to translate from the source language using the keyboard on the bottom screen. Above the keyboard, a list of possible source words is displayed. The user can choose between multiple words with similar spelling, such as touch (タッチ, tacchi) and Dutch account (ダッチ・アカウント, dacchi akaunto). The top screen displays the results of the search. The user can scroll between results using an on-screen scroll wheel on the right side of the lower screen.

Additionally, the software has a calculator.

== Development and release ==
The title was developed by YBM Sisa, a company that primarily creates English software for teaching people English. It was published by Daiwon C&A Holdings, now known as Daewon Media. The name was changed from Touch Dic to Touch Dictionary for release due to Western audiences mocking the original name for being unintentionally and comically vulgar. It was released only in South Korea. A Korean video advertisement for Touch Dictionary uses the phrase "daneoreul jageukhanda" (단어를 자극한다) as a slogan. Roughly translated, it means "Words stimulate."

Sony Computer Entertainment Korea produced a similar game, Hand Dictionary (also known as Hand Dic) for release for the PlayStation Portable.
