= Pschitt =

French soft drink

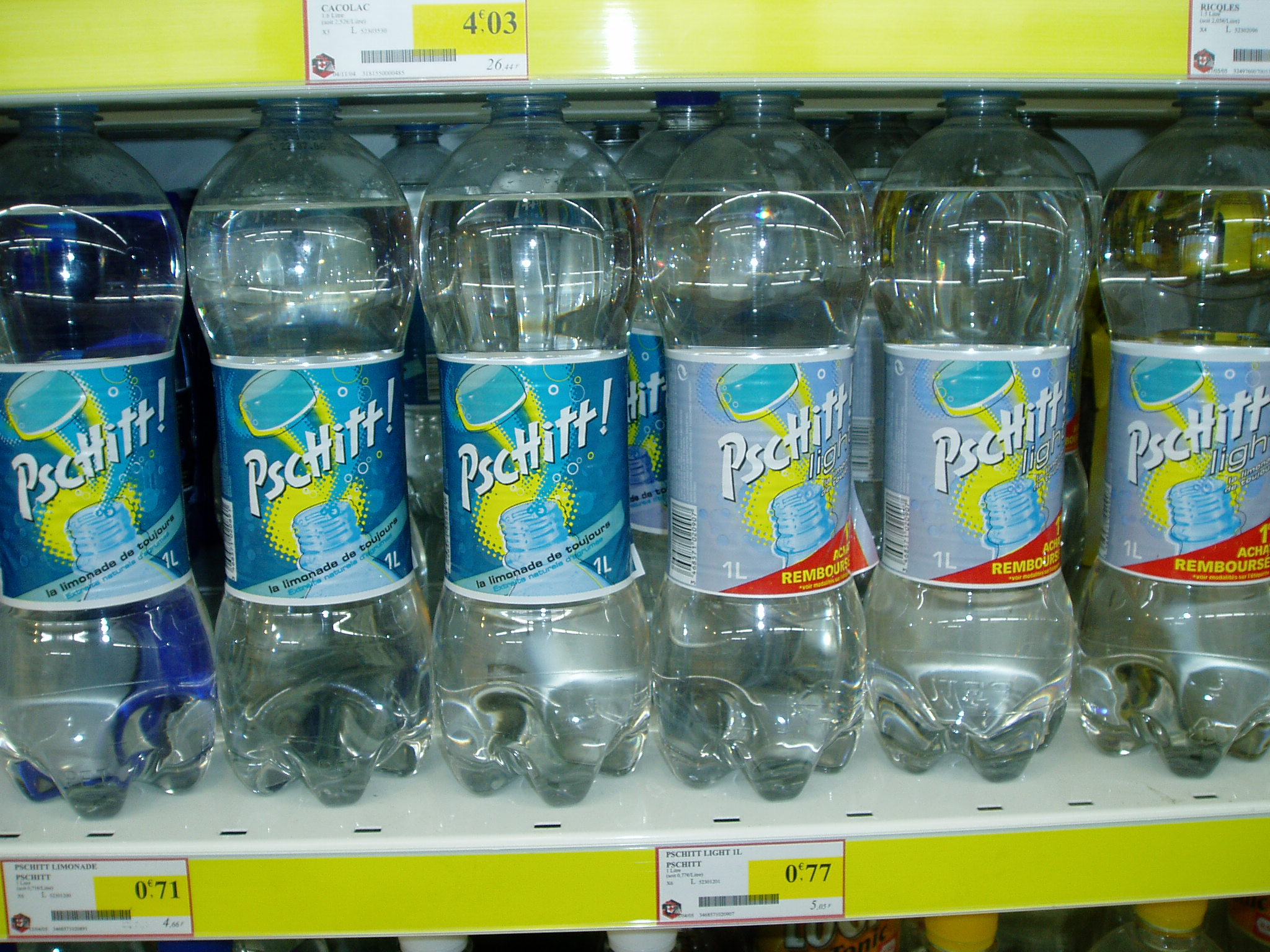
Bottles of Pschitt

Pschitt! is a French soft drink created by Perrier in 1954. The name originates in the transcription in French of the noise made by a Perrier bottle when it is opened. It comes in two flavors: lemon and orange. It is now a product of Roxane.

Pschitt is a carbonated soft drink flavored with orange or lemon, created in 1954 by the Perrier Vittel SA group. In November 1998, the Pschitt brand was acquired by Neptune, a subsidiary of the Castel Group.

The name of the soda originates from a slogan created by Jean Davray in 1946: "Perrier, the water that goes pschitt." Pschitt was launched in 1955 with a slogan by the same author: "For you, dear angel, Pschitt orange, for me, boy, Pschitt lemon."

Renowned artists were commissioned for other advertising campaigns: Jean-Gabriel Domergue, who had already created the Perrier Girl in 1936; likewise, Salvador Dalí created an advertising drawing in 1969 that was later used to publish a booklet, which included a text by Charles Trenet about Pschitt, beginning with: "When I was a journalist (in a dream), I was once a special correspondent to Thirst."

After the launch of the satellite Sputnik 1 by the USSR as part of the Space Race in October 1957, the United States, determined to erase the "Soviet affront," accelerated their Vanguard program, but two attempts to launch a satellite in November and December 1957 ended in failure. It was on this occasion that a sarcastic French journalist referred to "the rocket that goes pschitt," in reference to the famous soda whose marketing began with the slogan "the bottle that goes pschitt."

The satirical show La Boîte à sel also parodied this slogan in relation to a tire fragility issue, with one brand becoming "The tire that goes pschitt" and another "the tire that unseats and dances" (a nod to the slogan of another sparkling water, Vittelloise: "the water that sings and dances").

In 1985, Chantal Goya filmed a commercial for the brand featuring a song by Jean-Jacques Debout.

After attempting to relaunch the brand for nostalgic adults who remembered the drink from their childhood, children boosted sales thanks to the appeal of Pokémon, whose license was acquired by Neptune in 1999: purchasing Pschitt bottles allowed consumers to win cards.

In 2005, 50 years after its creation, the brand temporarily disappeared before returning to the market. The brand still exists, and it is even possible to order online. It is owned by the Castel Group.
