= Rogue Stormers =

2016 video game

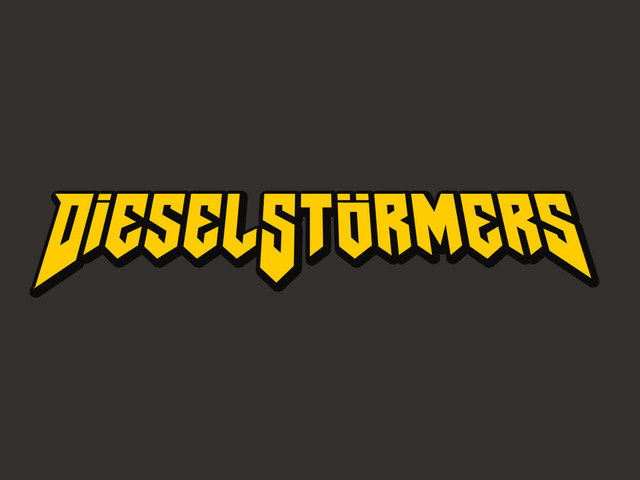
- Developer: Black Forest Games
- Publishers: HandyGames (Win); Black Forest Games (Linux, PS4, XONE)
- Composer: Jonathan van den Wijngaarden
- Platforms: Windows, Linux, PlayStation 4, Xbox One
- Release: Windows; April 21, 2016; Linux; September 8, 2016; PlayStation 4; October 4, 2016; Xbox One; October 7, 2016
- Genre: Action
- Modes: Single-player, multiplayer

Rogue Stormers (originally DieselStörmers) is a fantasy action game, initially developed by Spellbound Entertainment. It was revealed at the Game Developers Conference 2010, in San Francisco under the project name Ravensdale, and it has been in development since 2007.

In 2012, Spellbound Entertainment went into administration, emerging as Black Forest Games. They have since planned on continuing the development under the name DieselStörmers until the developer changed the name to Rogue Stormers in 2015.

== History ==
The game had been in development since April 2013, but the concept already existed in 2008, before Spellbound received the rights for Arcania: Gothic 4. It was shelved at the time so that the team could focus its attention and resources on Arcania. After the successful release of Giana Sisters: Twisted Dreams, Black Forest Games turned its attention back to Ravensdale and decided to fund the project via Kickstarter. In 2013, crowdfunding for the game was cancelled. In 2014 the game was renamed to DieselStörmers, and the team started a second Kickstarter campaign which was successful.

The game was released on Steam Early Access on July 17, 2014.

Due to a successful trademark lawsuit by Diesel S.p.A., who owns the trademark "Diesel" in relation to video games, Black Forest Games was required to drop the title DieselStörmers. It was announced on October 17, 2015 that Black Forest Games changed the name DieselStörmers to Rogue Stormers after Diesel S.p.A. successfully opposed Black Forest Games' trademark registration of DieselStörmers.

== Gameplay ==
Rogue Stormers is a multiplayer platformer focused on a cooperative style of gameplay. Players team up with their friends, fighting hordes of orcs and goblins with customizable weapons. As a reward for completing missions, the players receive crafting materials and gun parts, which can be assembled to fit their personal playstyle (e.g. affecting stats like range or rate of fire, bullet patterns like shotgun or cannon, or additional effects (rebounding shots, piercing shots, incendiary ammunition etc.). The game supports online- and local co-op, as well as single-player.
