= List of chicken dishes =

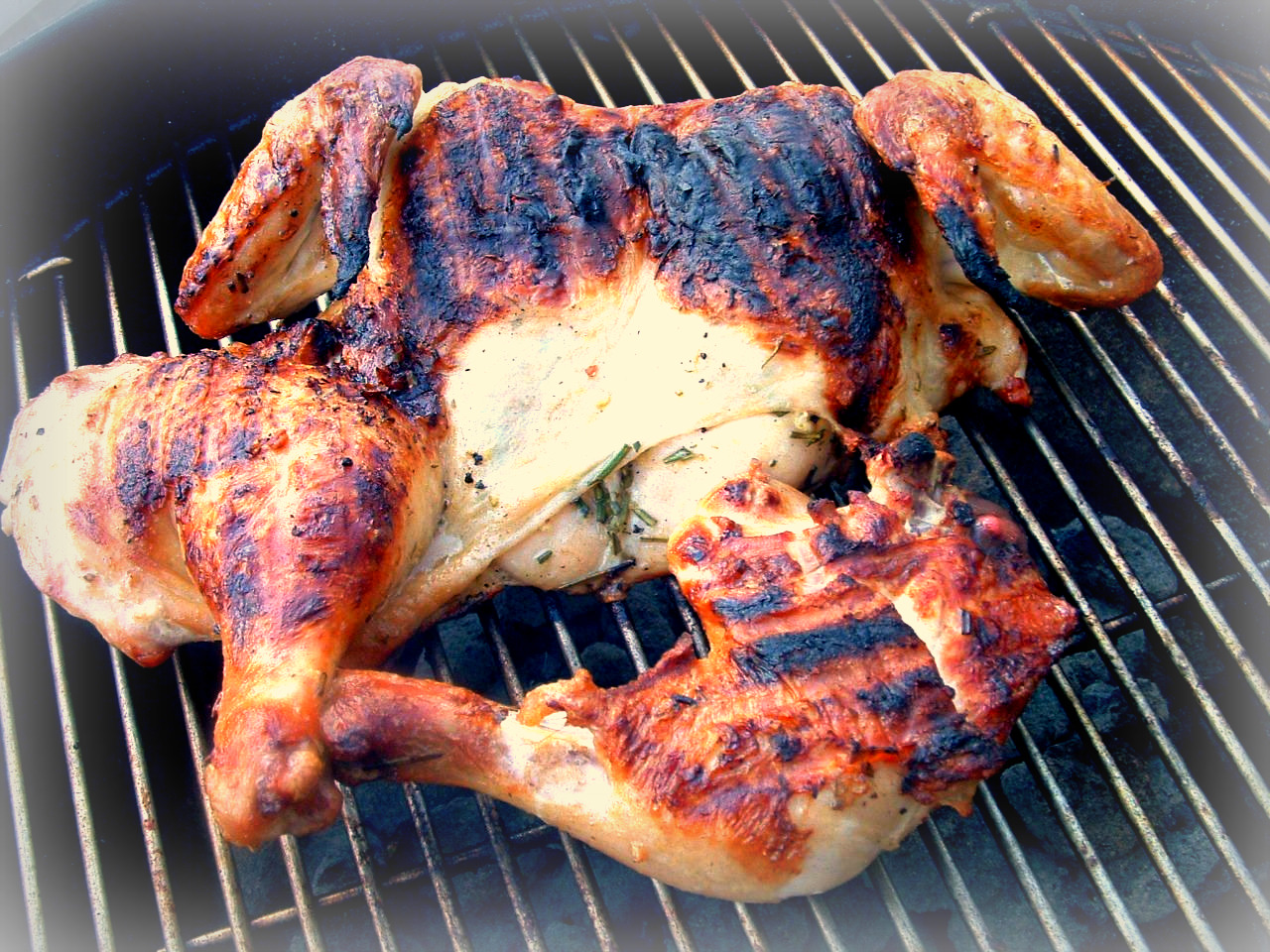
Roasting or grilling chicken is the common method to cook chicken worldwide.

This is a list of chicken dishes. Chicken is the second most consumed meat in the world, and was one of the first domesticated animals. Chicken is a major worldwide source of meat and eggs for human consumption. It is prepared as food in a wide variety of ways, varying by region and culture. The prevalence of chickens is due to almost the entire chicken being edible, and the ease of raising them. The chicken domesticated for its meat are broilers and for its eggs are layers.

Chicken as a meat has been depicted in Babylonian carvings from around 600 BC. Chicken was one of the most common meats available in the Middle Ages. It was eaten over most of the Eastern Hemisphere and several different numbers and kinds of chicken such as capons, pullets, and hens were eaten. It was one of the basic ingredients in the so-called white dish, a stew usually consisting of chicken and fried onions cooked in milk and seasoned with spices and sugar.

== Chicken dishes ==
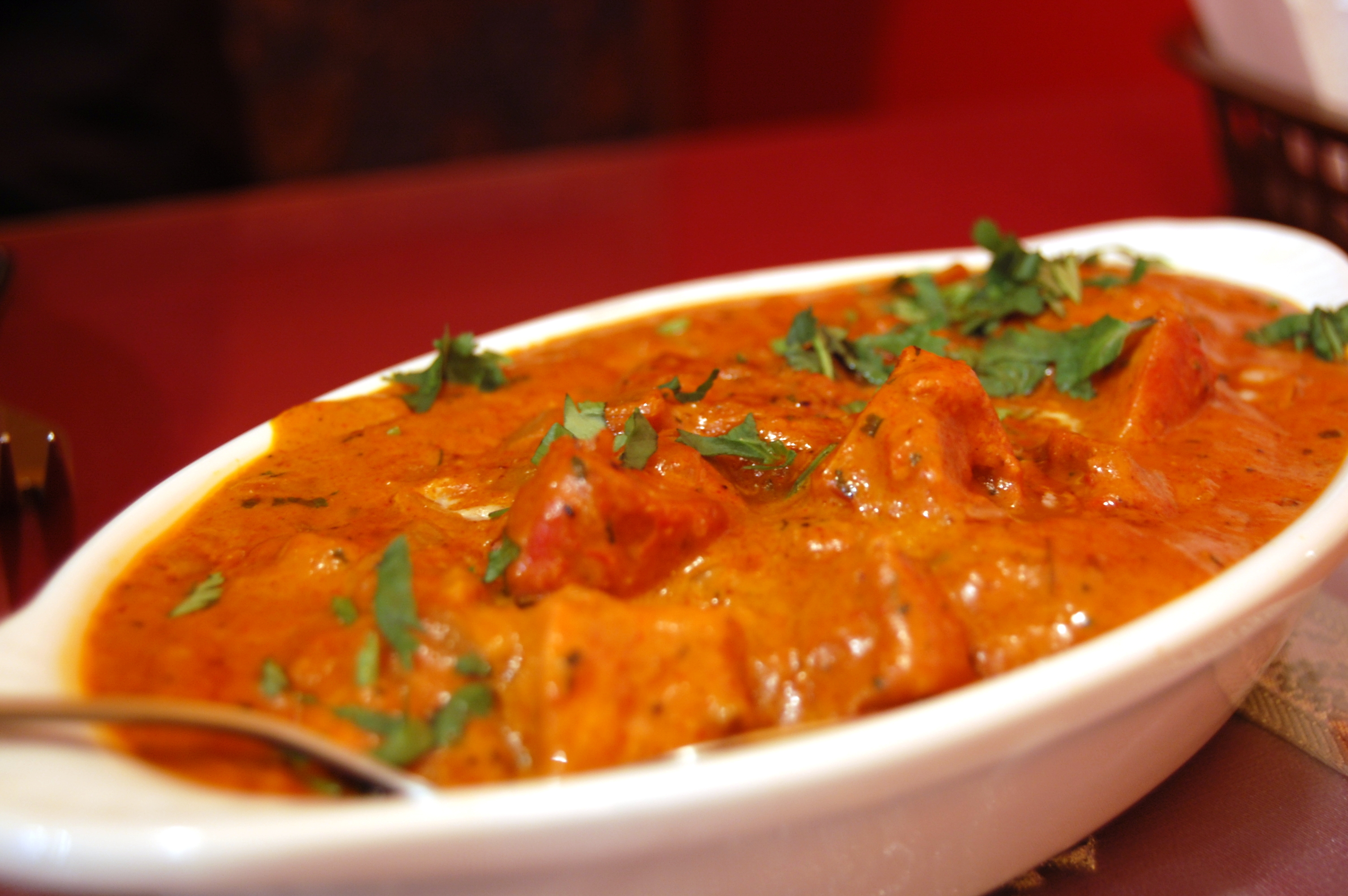
Butter chicken is an Indian dish made with mildly spiced tomato sauce.

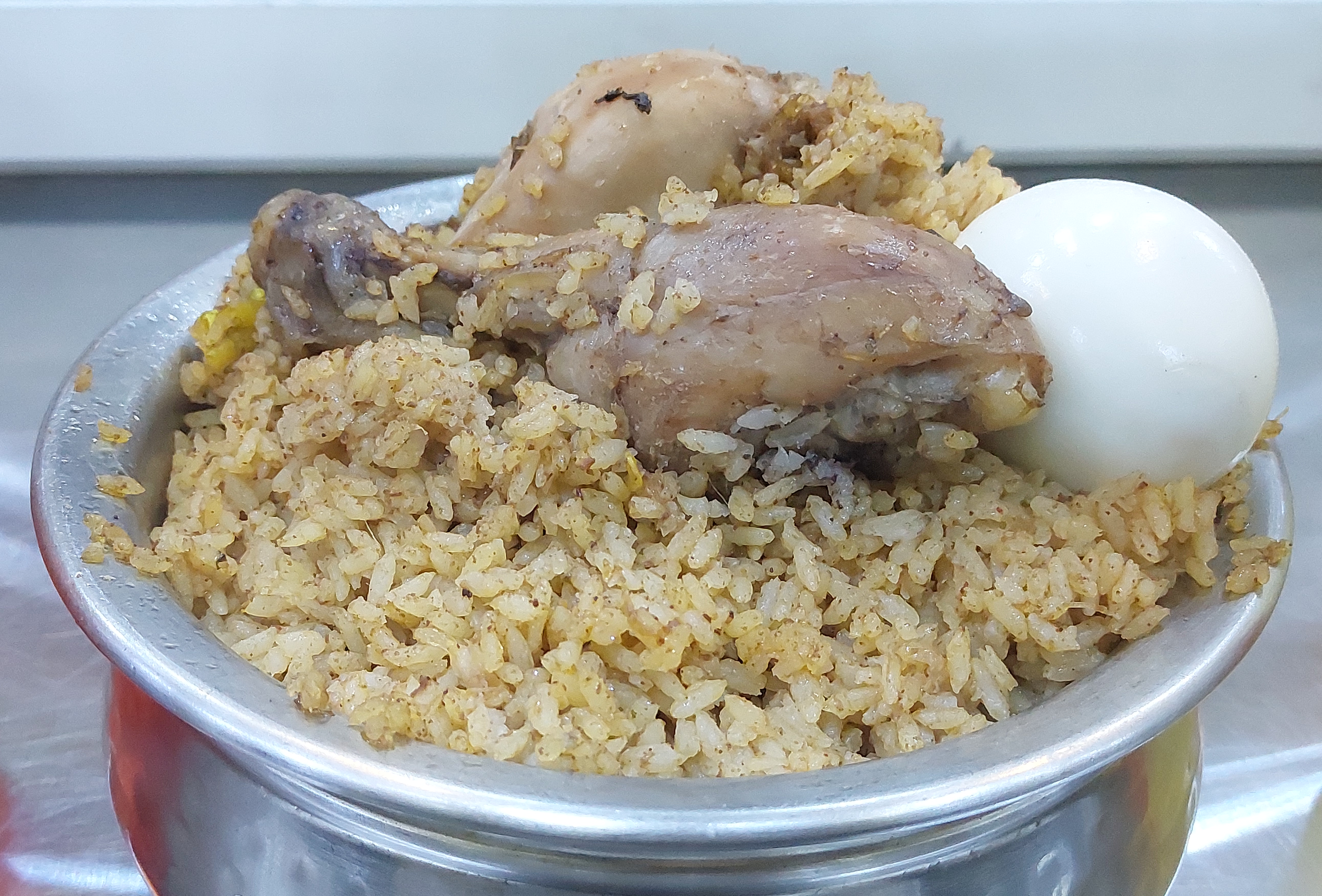
Chicken biryani

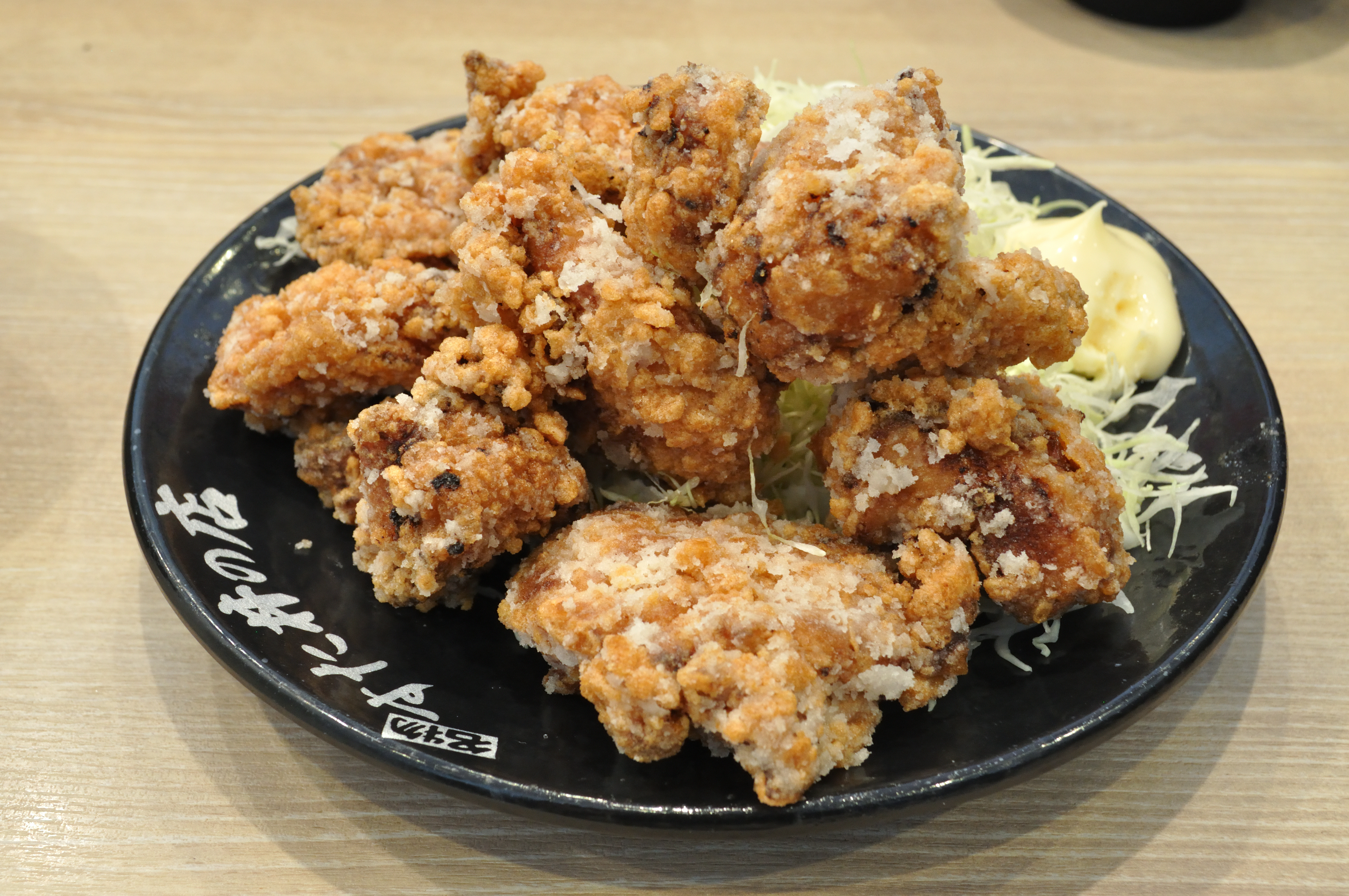
Karaage, a Japanese dish

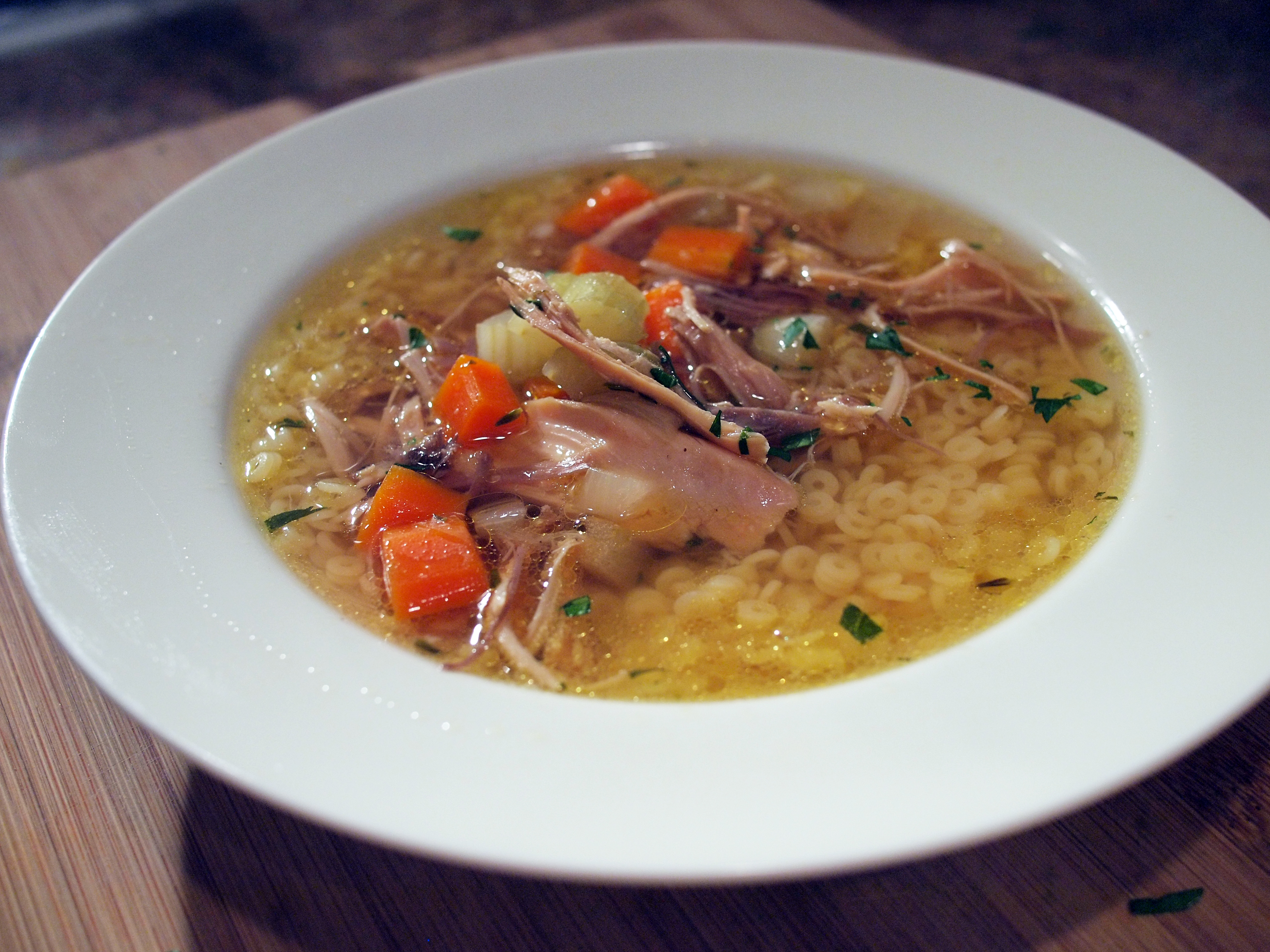
Chicken noodle soup

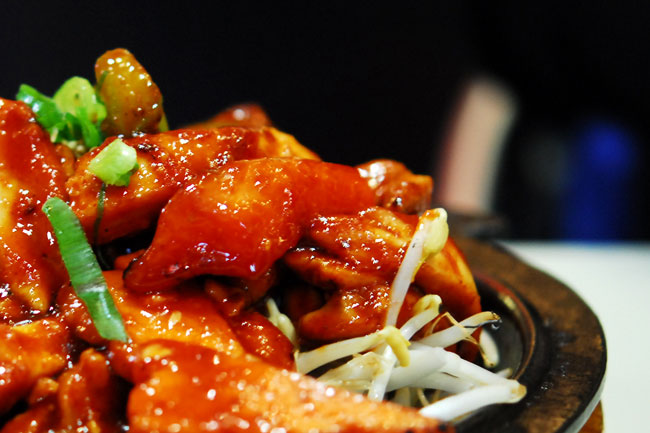
Buldak is a Korean dish made from heavily spiced chicken.

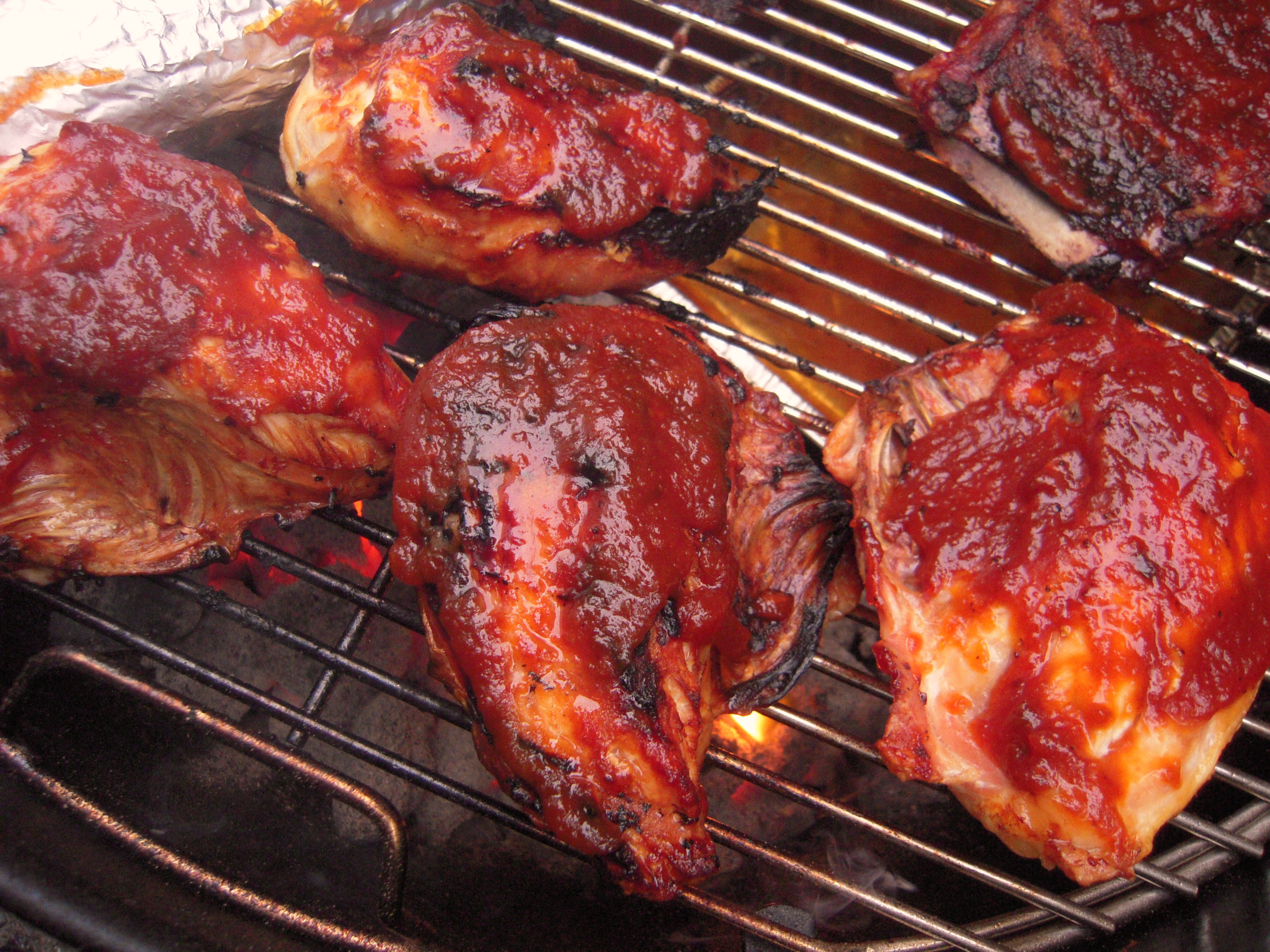
Marinated barbecue chicken

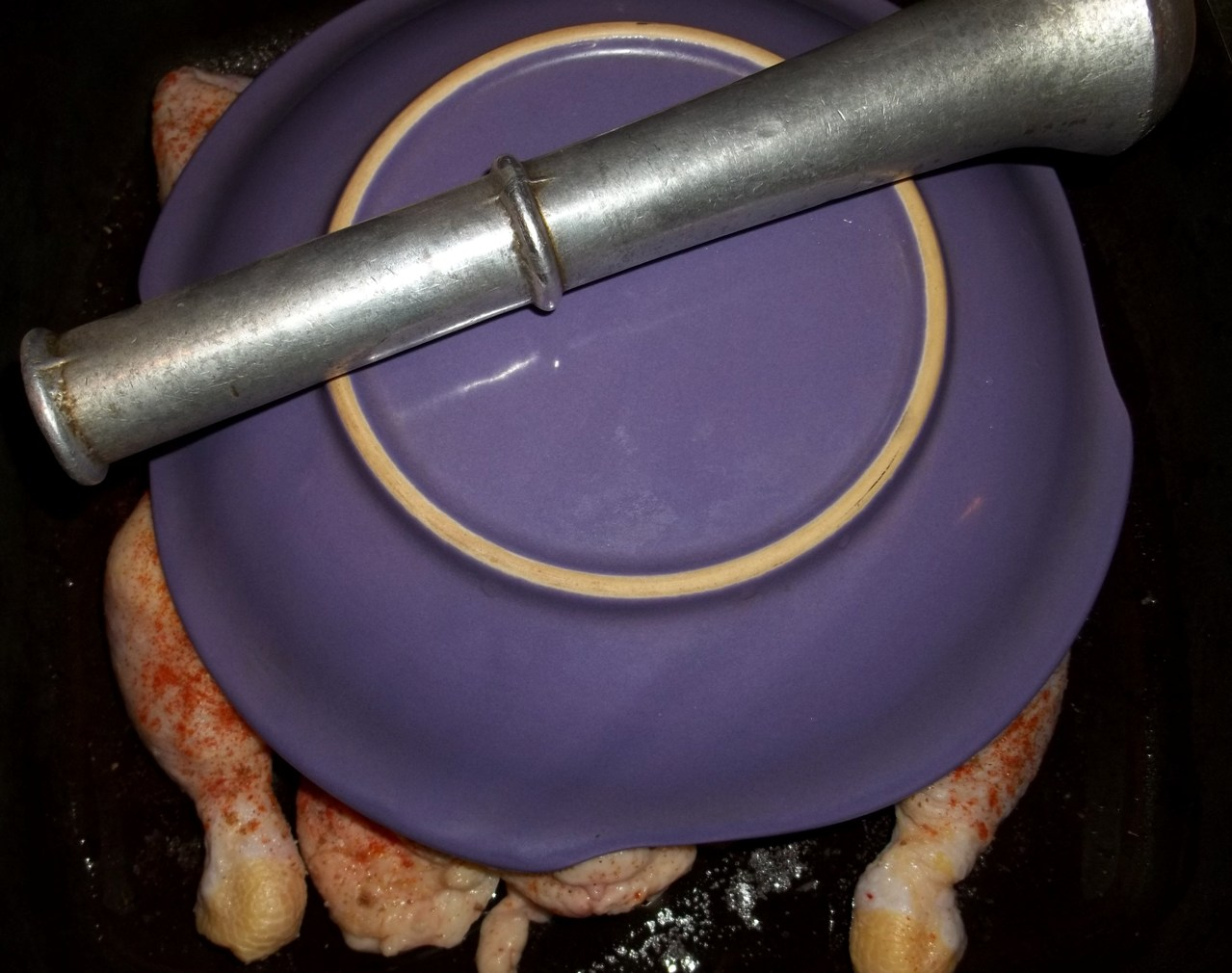
Cooking of chicken tabaka, a traditional Georgian dish

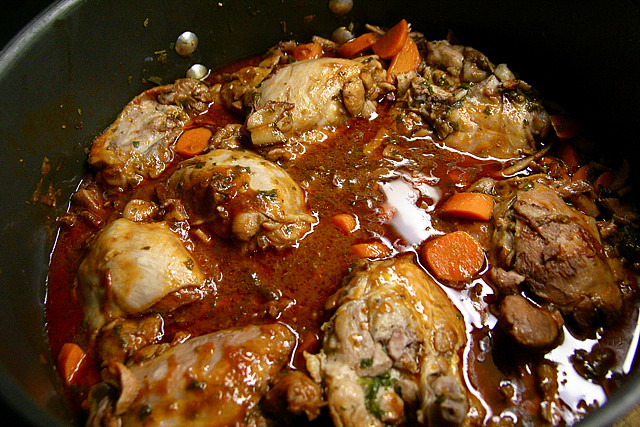
Coq au vin is a French dish of chicken braised with wine, lardons, mushrooms, and optionally garlic.

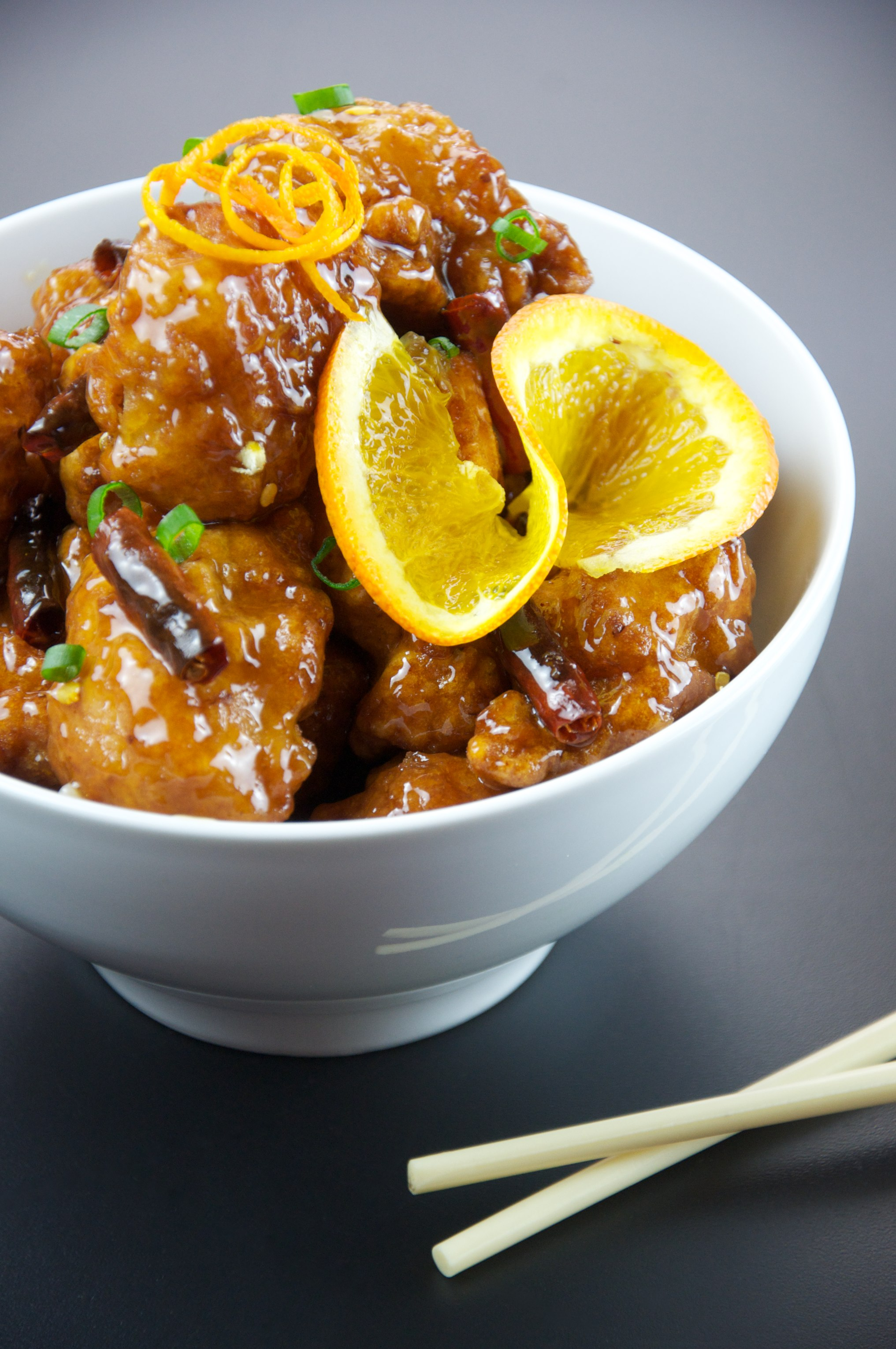
Orange chicken

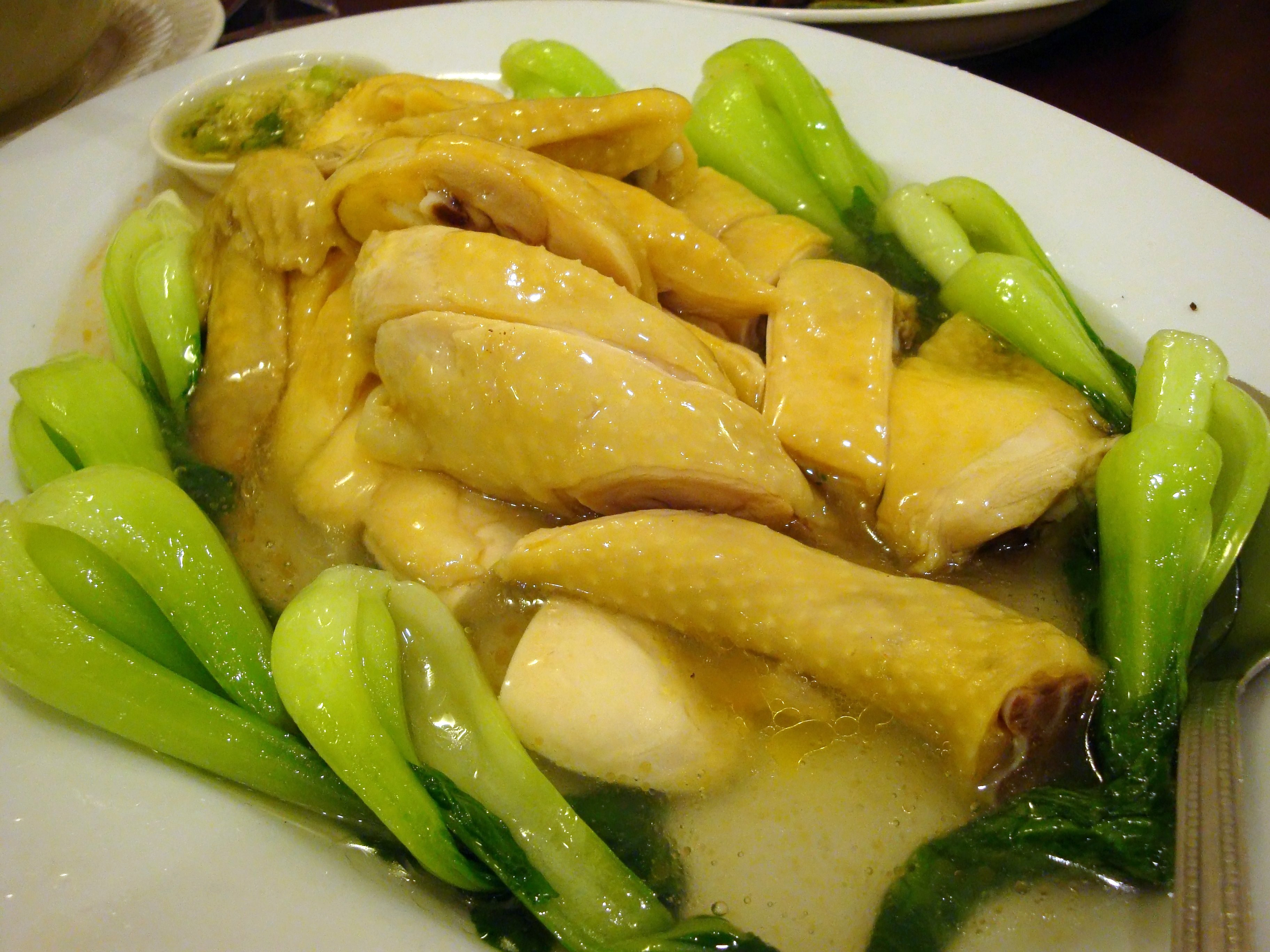
White cut chicken is a type of siu mei. Unlike most other meats in the siu mei category, this particular dish is not roasted; it is cooked in water or broth.

- Afritada – Filipino meat and vegetable stew
- Airline chicken – Boneless chicken breast with drumette
- Adobo – Iberian culinary style
- Ají de gallina – Peruvian chicken stew
- Andong jjimdak – Korean chicken dish originating from Andong
- Arroz con pollo – Traditional dish of Spain and Latin America
- Ayam bakar – Indonesian and Malay style grilled chicken
- Ayam betutu – Indonesian steamed/roasted chicken and duck dish
- Ayam bumbu rujak – Indonesian traditional chicken dish
- Ayam geprek – Indonesian fried chicken dish
- Ayam goreng – Indonesian and Malay fried chicken dish
- Ayam kecap – Indonesian chicken dish
- Ayam masak merah – Malaysian and Singaporean traditional dish
- Ayam penyet – Indonesian traditional fried chicken
- Ayam taliwang – Indonesian chicken dish
- Backhendl – Austrian fried chicken dish
- Bamboo chicken – South Asian chicken curry dish
- Barbecue chicken – Chicken that is barbecued, grilled or smoked
- Barberton chicken – Serbian-American fried chicken dish
- Barrel chicken
- Bean sprouts chicken – Chicken dish with bean sprouts
- Beer can chicken – Barbecued chicken dish
- Beggar's chicken – Chicken dish from China
- Bon bon chicken – Chinese chicken dish
- Bourbon chicken – Dish made with bourbon whiskey
- Brown stew chicken – Caribbean stew dish
- Bubur ayam – Indonesian and Malay chicken and rice porridge
- Buffalo wing – American dish of spicy chicken wings
- Buldak – Korean barbecued chicken dish
- Butter chicken – Indian curry dish. Known traditionally as murgh makhani
- Cabidela – Portuguese dish made with poultry
- Cafreal – Spicy chicken dish popular in Goa, India
- Cashew chicken – Chinese-American dish
- Chargha – Pakistani chicken dish
- Chi-Mc – Korean fried chicken served with beer
- Chicken 65 – South Indian chicken dish
- Chicken à la King – Diced creamed chicken served on toast
- Chicken and duck blood soup – Shanghainese soup-based blood dish
- Chicken and dumplings – Chicken-based soup
- Chicken and waffles – American dish
- Chicken balls – Chicken meat shaped into a sphere
- Chicken biriyani – Rice-based dish from South Asia
- Chicken bog – Lowcountry chicken pilaf
- Chicken cacciatore – Italian dish
- Chicken Chettinad – Chicken curry dish from South India
- Chicken chop – Malaysian-style fried chicken dish
- Chicken curry – Curry with chicken
- Chicken curry puff – Pastry with curry filling
- Chicken Divan – Chicken casserole
- Chicken fillet roll – Hot chicken fillet in a roll
- Chicken fingers – U.S. dish of breaded and fried chicken meat
- Chicken French – Italian-American dish
- Chicken fries – Fried chicken product sold by Burger King
- Chicken ghee roast – Indian chicken curry dish
- Chicken green curry (kaeng khiao wan kai) – Variety of curry
- Chicken jalfrezi – Curry dish
- Chicken in a basket – Method of serving food
- Chicken karahi – South Asian dish
- Chicken kebab – Variety of meat dishes originating in the Middle East
- Chicken Kiev – Chicken dish associated with Russian and Ukrainian cuisines
- Chicken korma – Type of curry
- Chicken Lahori – Pakistani curry dish
- Chicken lollipop – Indian fried chicken appetizer
- Chicken Manchurian – Deep-fried savory dish in Indo-Chinese cuisine
- Chicken Marengo – French dish
- Chicken marsala – Dish of chicken in a Marsala wine sauce
- Chicken Maryland – Fried chicken dish with cream sauce
- Chicken mull – American regional chicken stew
- Chicken nugget – Breaded deboned chicken meat pieces
- Chicken paillard – Thin, flat piece of meat
- Chicken paprikash – Hungarian chicken dish seasoned with paprika
- Chicken parmesan – Italian-American dish
- Chicken parmo – English take-away dish
- Chicken pie – British pie dish
- Chicken pot pie – Meat pie made with flaky pastry
- Chicken Rezala – Culinary tradition
- Chicken riggies – American pasta dish
- Chicken salad – Salad made with chicken
- Chicken salad sandwich – Salad made with chicken
- Chicken sandwich – Type of sandwich
- Chicken shawarma – Middle Eastern dish
- Chicken soup – Soup made from chicken
- Chicken tabaka – Georgian pan-fried chicken dish
- Chicken tatsuta – Japanese McDonald's burger
- Chicken tikka – Boneless chicken pieces cooked in a tandoor
- Chicken tikka masala – Indo-British dish
- Chicken under a brick – Roast chicken dish
- Chicken Vesuvio – Italian-American dish popular in Chicago
- Chicken vindaloo – Type of curry
- Chicken wing rice roll – Taiwanese chicken and rice dish
- Chicken with chilies – Chongqing dish of deep-fried chicken with dried chilies
- Chigirtma – Azerbaijani egg dish
- Chikuzenni – Japanese dish
- Chilli chicken – Indo-Chinese dish
- Chinese chicken salad – American chicken salad with Chinese inspired ingredients
- Chkmeruli – Traditional Georgian chicken dish
- Chuan – Chinese street food
- Circassian chicken – Shredded chicken with walnut sauce
- Claypot chicken rice – Chinese rice dish
- Cock-a-leekie soup – Scottish soup
- Cola chicken – Hong Kong chicken dish
- Coq au vin – French style chicken stew
- Cordon bleu – Meat and cheese dish
- Coronation chicken – English chicken dish
- Country Captain – Curried chicken dish
- Coxinha – Brazilian snack
- Crispy fried chicken – Chinese dish of fried chicken
- Dak galbi – Korean spicy stir-fried chicken
- Dakjuk – Korean porridge dish
- Dakkochi – South Korean street food
- Dapanji – Chinese and Dungan stewed chicken dish
- Day-old chick – Filipino fried chicken hatchling
- Dezhou braised chicken – Chinese dish from the city of Dezhou in Shandong Province, China
- Dong'an chicken – Chinese chicken dish
- Double Down – KFC sandwich
- Dragon tiger phoenix – Chinese dish
- Dry pot chicken – Chinese chicken dish
- Drunken chicken – Alcoholic chicken dish
- Durus kura – Traditional fried chicken curry Rohingya and Chittagonian cuisine
- Engagement chicken – American dish rumored to lead to marriage
- Essence of chicken – Asian dietary supplement
- Flying Jacob – Type of casserole from Sweden
- Fricasé – Bolivian soup dish
- Fried chicken – Dish of seasoned chicken pieces that are coated and fried
- Fujian red wine chicken – Chinese chicken dish
- Galinha à africana – Macanese chicken dish
- Galinha à portuguesa – Chicken dish from Macau
- Galinhada – Brazilian chicken and rice dish
- Gallo en chicha – Central American chicken dish
- General Tso's chicken – Deep-fried chicken dish
- Gribenes – Ashkenazi Jewish dish
- Gulai ayam – Southeast Asian dish
- Hainanese chicken rice – Southeast Asian dish
- Hawaiian haystack – Chicken dish from Western United States
- Helzel – Ashkenazi Jewish dish
- Hot chicken – Chicken dish from Nashville, Tennessee, US
- Huli-huli chicken – Hawaiian chicken dish
- Chicken chasseur – French chicken dish
- Inasal na manok – Roasted chicken dish from the Philippines
- Jambonneau – Part of a leg of pork or ham
- Jerk chicken – Style of cooking native to Jamaica
- Jerusalem mixed grill – Israeli grilled meat dish
- Jubilee chicken – Dish created to celebrate the jubilees of British monarchs
- Jujeh kabab – Persian chicken kebab
- Kadai chicken – South Asian dish
- Kai yang – Lao-Thai grilled chicken
- Ka prao kai – Fried rice dish from Thailand
- Karaage – Japanese cooking technique
- Kedjenou – Spicy chicken stew from West Africa
- Kelaguen – Chamorro dish of meat and green onions in an acidic marinade
- Kinamatisang manok – Filipino chicken and tomato stew
- King Ranch chicken – Tex-Mex casserole
- Korean fried chicken – Variety of fried chicken dishes from South Korea
- Kori rotti – Spicy dish from India
- Kuku paka – African chicken dish
- Kung Pao chicken – Spicy stir-fried dish
- Kurnik (pirog) – Gourmet chicken-filled pirog in Russian cuisine
- Lavangi – Talysh dish
- Laziji – Chongqing dish of deep-fried chicken with dried chilies
- Lemon chicken – Name of several dishes featuring chicken and lemon
- Lontong Cap Go Meh – Indonesian rice dish
- Mangalorean Chicken Sukka – Indian chicken dish native to the Mangalore and Udupi regions
- Maraq – Type of broth or soup
- Mie ayam – Indonesian chicken noodle dish
- Momo – Nepalese and Tibetan dumpling
- Moo goo gai pan – Americanized version of a Cantonese dish
- Murgh Musallam – Dish from the Indian subcontinent
- Musakhan – Palestinian bread and chicken dish
- Massaman curry – Mild Thai curry
- Nasi liwet – Central Javanese rice dish
- Nasi tim – Indonesian steamed chicken rice dish
- Olivier salad – Russian traditional dish
- Opor ayam – Indonesian chicken coconut milk dish
- Orange chicken – American Chinese chicken dish
- Ostropel – Romanian stew
- Oyakodon – Japanese chicken, egg and rice dish
- Padak – South Korean fried chicken dish
- Pastilla – North African pie made from meat and layered pastry dough
- Philippine adobo – Filipino dish of meat cooked in soy sauce and vinegar
- Piccata – Italian dish
- Pininyahang manok – Filipino chicken dish
- Pinikpikan – Traditional dish in Philippines
- Piyanggang manok – Filipino chicken dish
- Plecing ayam – Traditional food from Indonesia
- Pollo al carbón – Charbroiled chicken
- Pollo a la Brasa – Peruvian chicken dish
- Pollo al disco – Argentine chicken dish
- Popcorn chicken – Chicken dish originated from Kentucky Fried Chicken
- Poularde Albufera – Chicken dish
- Poulet au fromage – French chicken and cheese dish
- Pozharsky cutlet – Russian dish of breaded ground meat
- Rendang ayam – Southeast Asian dish
- Roast chicken – Dish of whole chicken broiled or fried on all sides to cook it through
- Rollatini – Italian-style dish
- Rotisserie chicken – Chicken dish
- Sajji – Meat dish from Pakistan
- Saltimbocca – Italian dish
- Samgyetang – Korean soup with whole stuffed chicken
- Sanbeiji – Chinese and Taiwanese chicken dish
- Satay – Southeast Asian form of kebab
- Scaloppine – Type of Italian meat dish
- Schnitzel – Breaded, fried flat piece of meat
- Sesame chicken – Chicken dish
- Sesame oil chicken
- Shish taouk – Chicken dish
- Shish taouk (Montreal) – Middle Eastern dish
- Sio-tsiú-ke
- Sorol – Filipino dish
- Soto ayam – Indonesian chicken soup
- Soy sauce chicken – Traditional Cantonese dish
- Spice bag – Fast food dish created in Ireland
- Spicy chicken sandwich – Sandwich made with chicken
- Sweet and sour chicken – Cooking method
- Swiss wing – Chicken wing dish of Hong Kong
- Taiwanese fried chicken – Dish in Taiwanese cuisine
- Tandoori chicken – Marinated roast chicken dish
- Tavuk göğsü – Ottoman milk pudding made with chicken breast
- Tbeet – Iraqi-Jewish shabbat overnight stew of chicken
- Teriyaki – Japanese marinade
- Thalassery biryani – Culinary traditions of Thalassery, Kerala
- Tinga – Mexican chicken dish
- Tom kha kai – Thai coconut milk and chicken soup
- Torikatsu – Japanese fried chicken dish
- Torisashi – Japanese chicken dish
- Tsukune – Japanese chicken meatball
- Waterzooi – Traditional Belgian stew
- Wenchang chicken – Chicken dish from Hainan, China
- White cut chicken – Chinese cuisine dish
- Yakitori – Japanese type of grilled chicken
- Yangnyeom chicken – Sauced Korean fried chicken variety
- Yassa – Senegalese spicy marinated poultry or fish dish
Chicken dishes

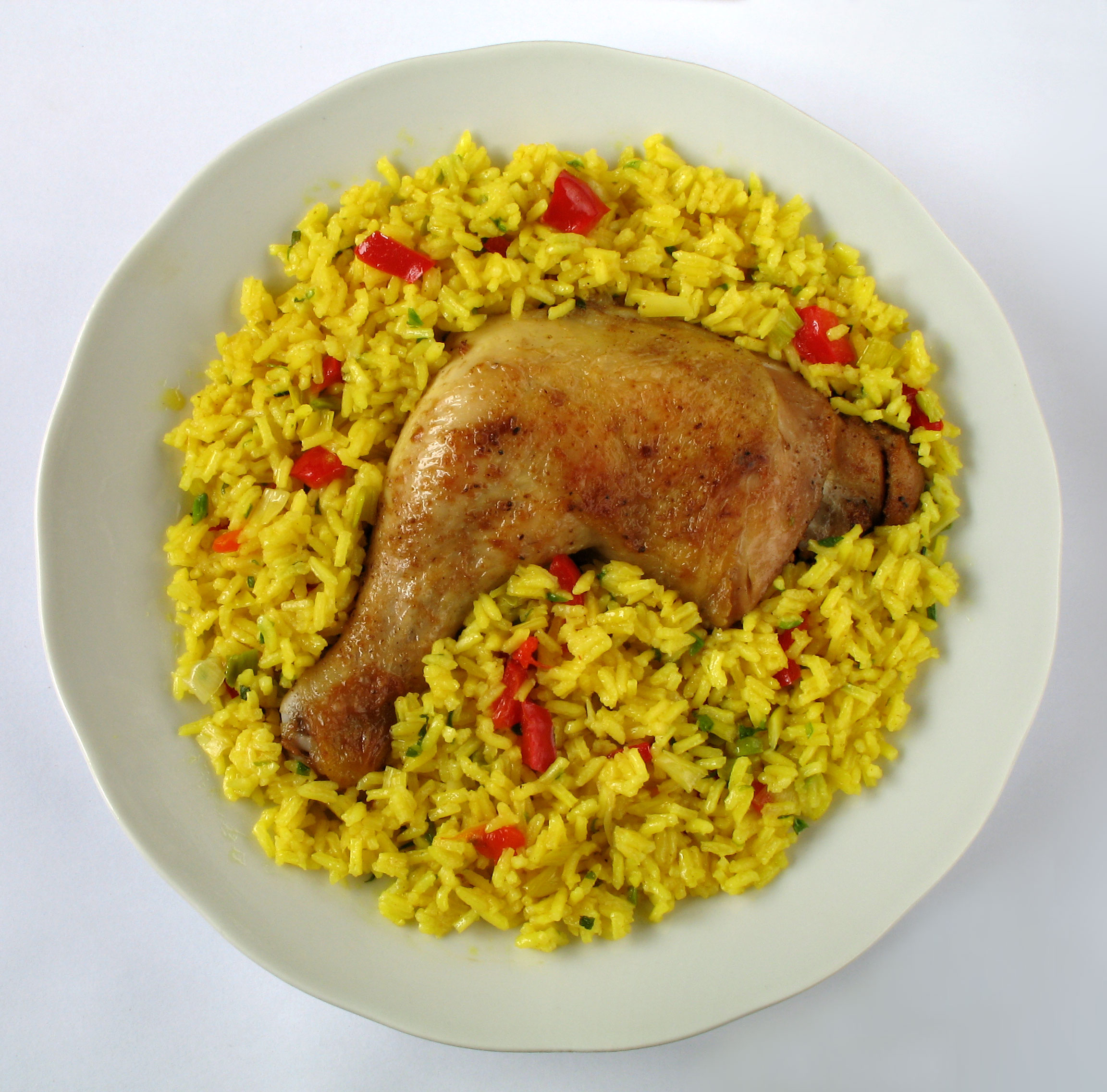
Arroz con pollo (chicken and rice)

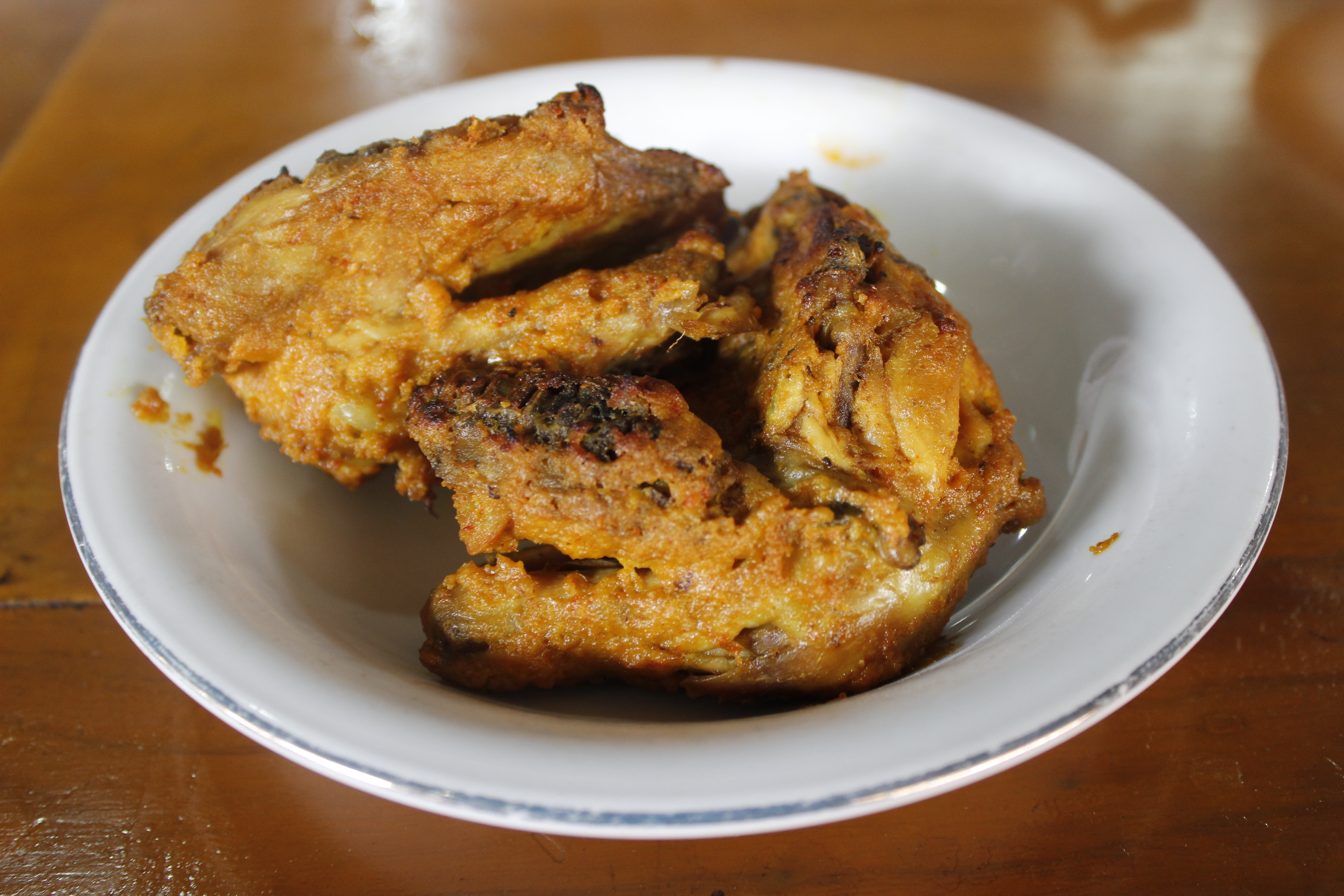
Ayam bakar Padang, Indonesian grilled chicken in rich bumbu (spice mixture); shallot, garlic, chili pepper, candlenut, galangal and turmeric

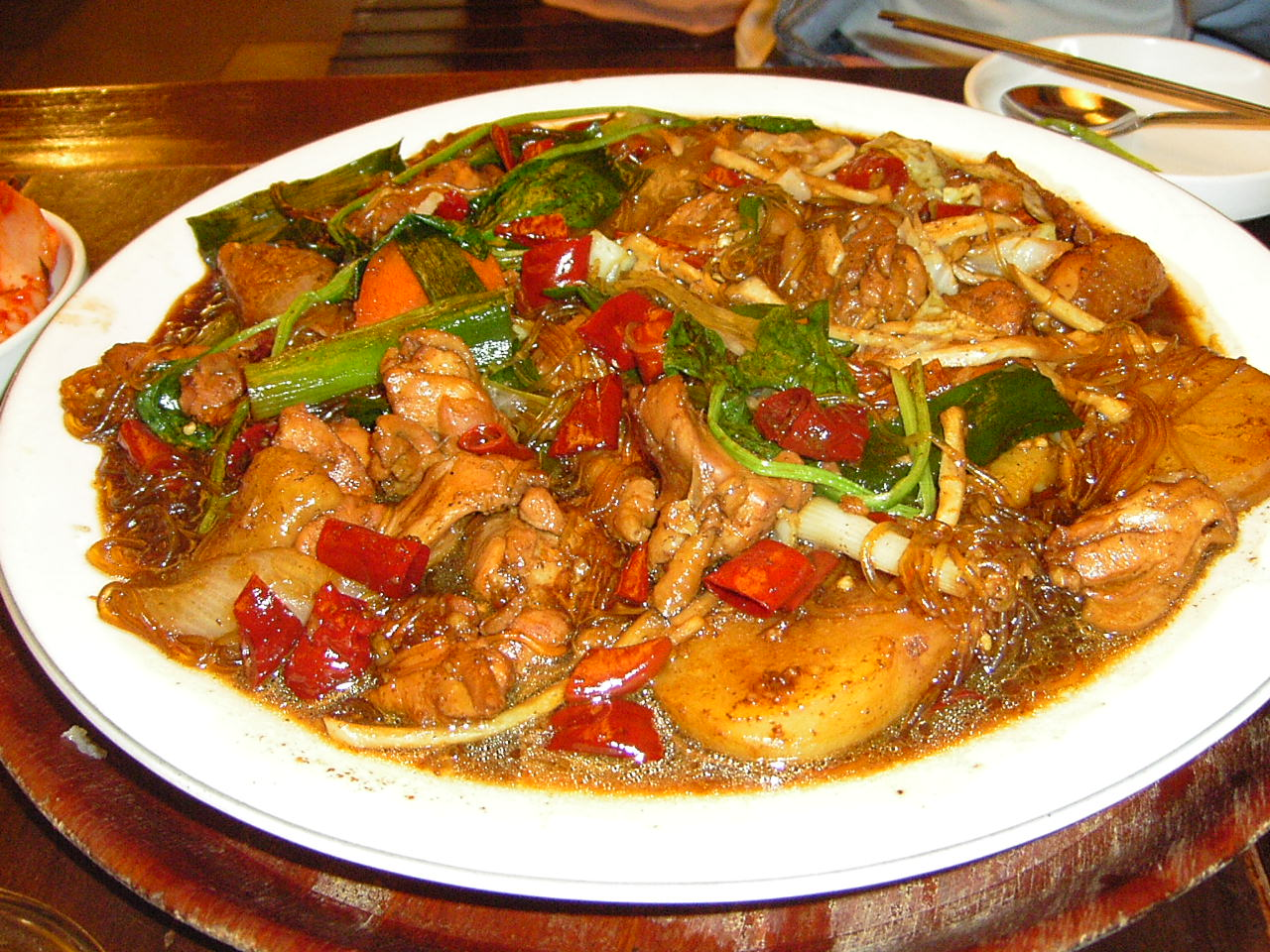
Andong jjimdak is a variety of jjim (a Korean steamed or boiled dish) made with chicken and various vegetables marinated in a ganjang based sauce.

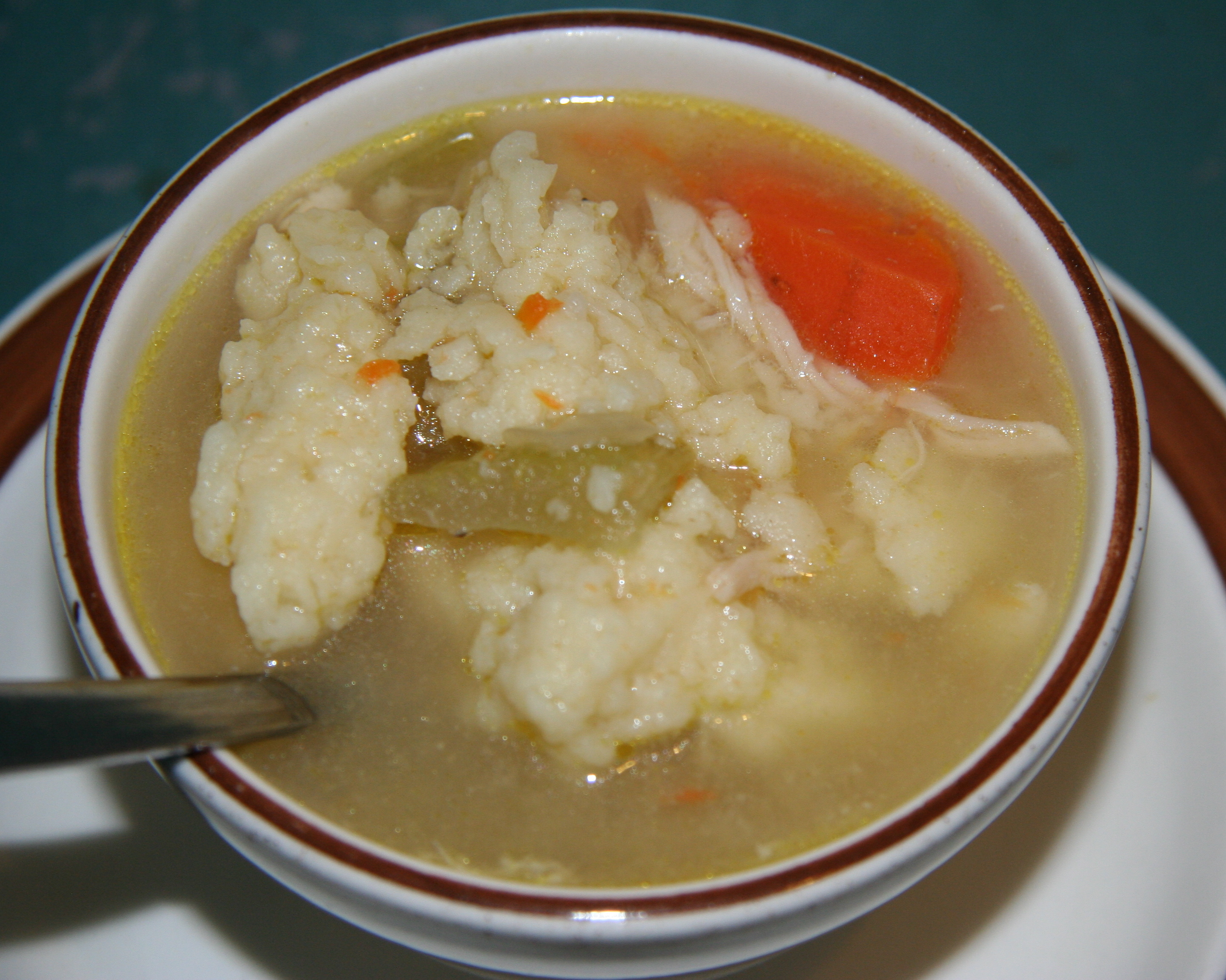
A bowl of chicken and dumplings

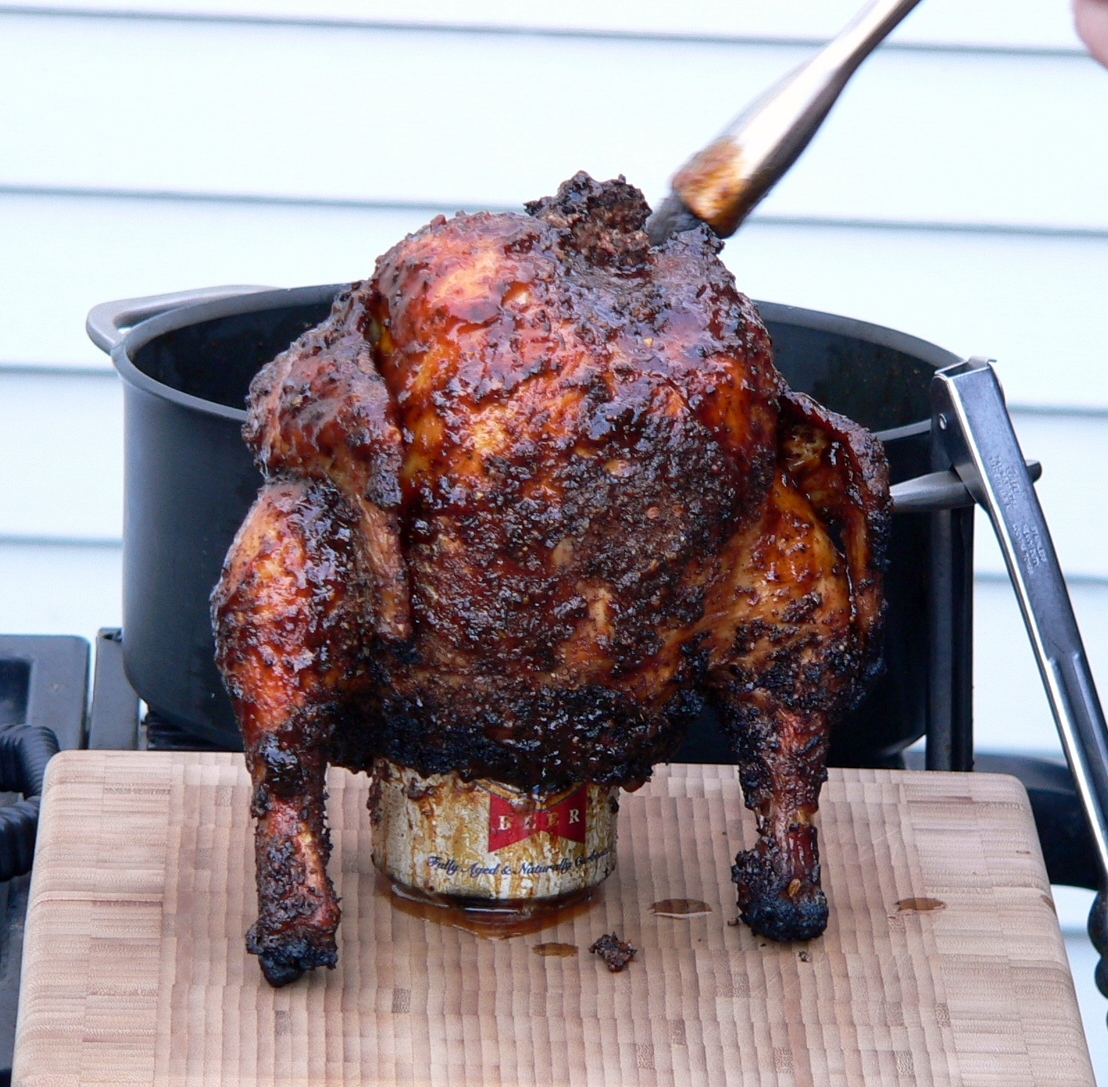
Beer can chicken

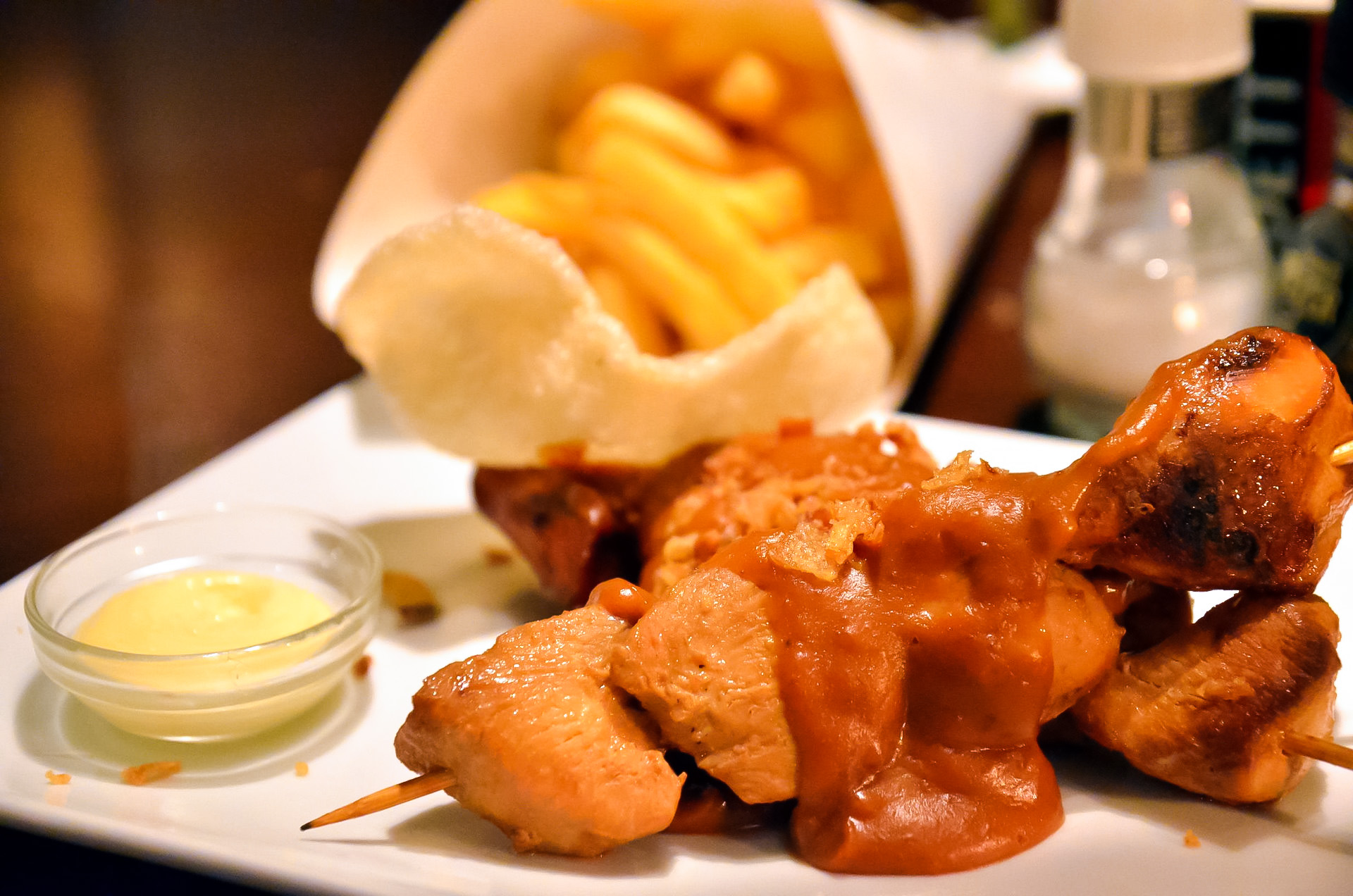
Chicken satay in the Netherlands with peanut sauce, French fries, prawn crackers, and mayonnaise; as served in a pub in Amsterdam

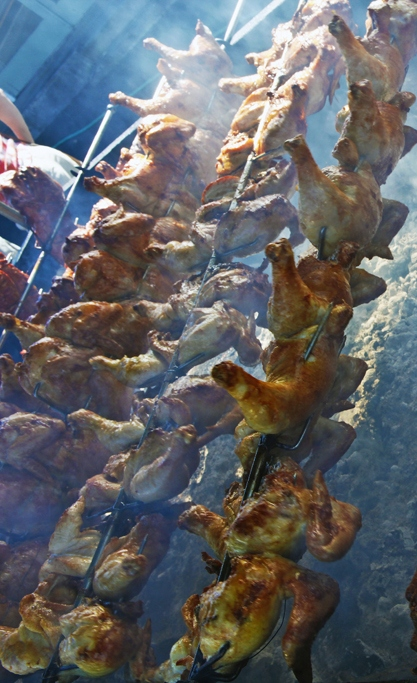
Huli-huli chicken roasting on spits

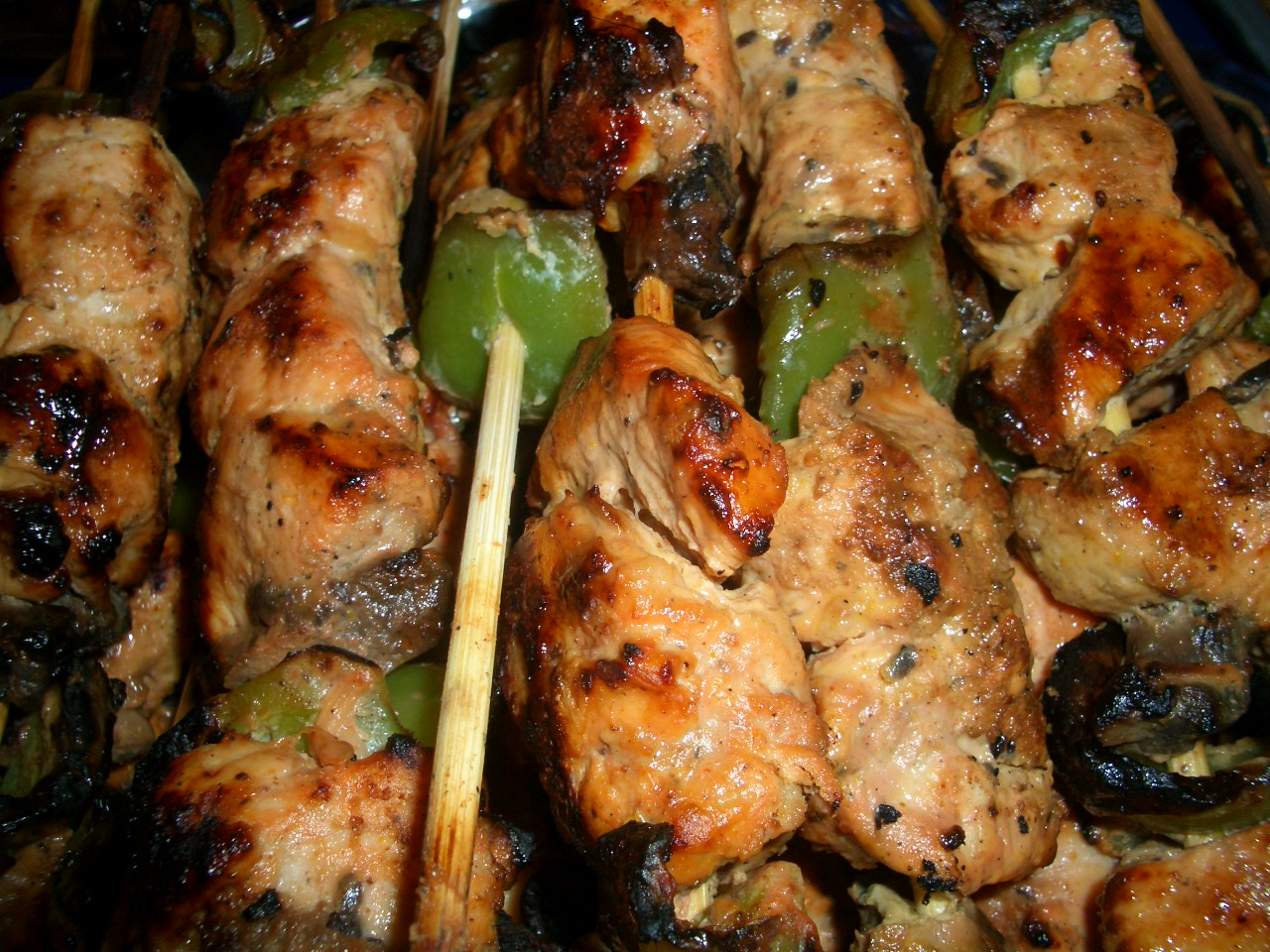
Shish taouk, a traditional Middle Eastern shish kebab

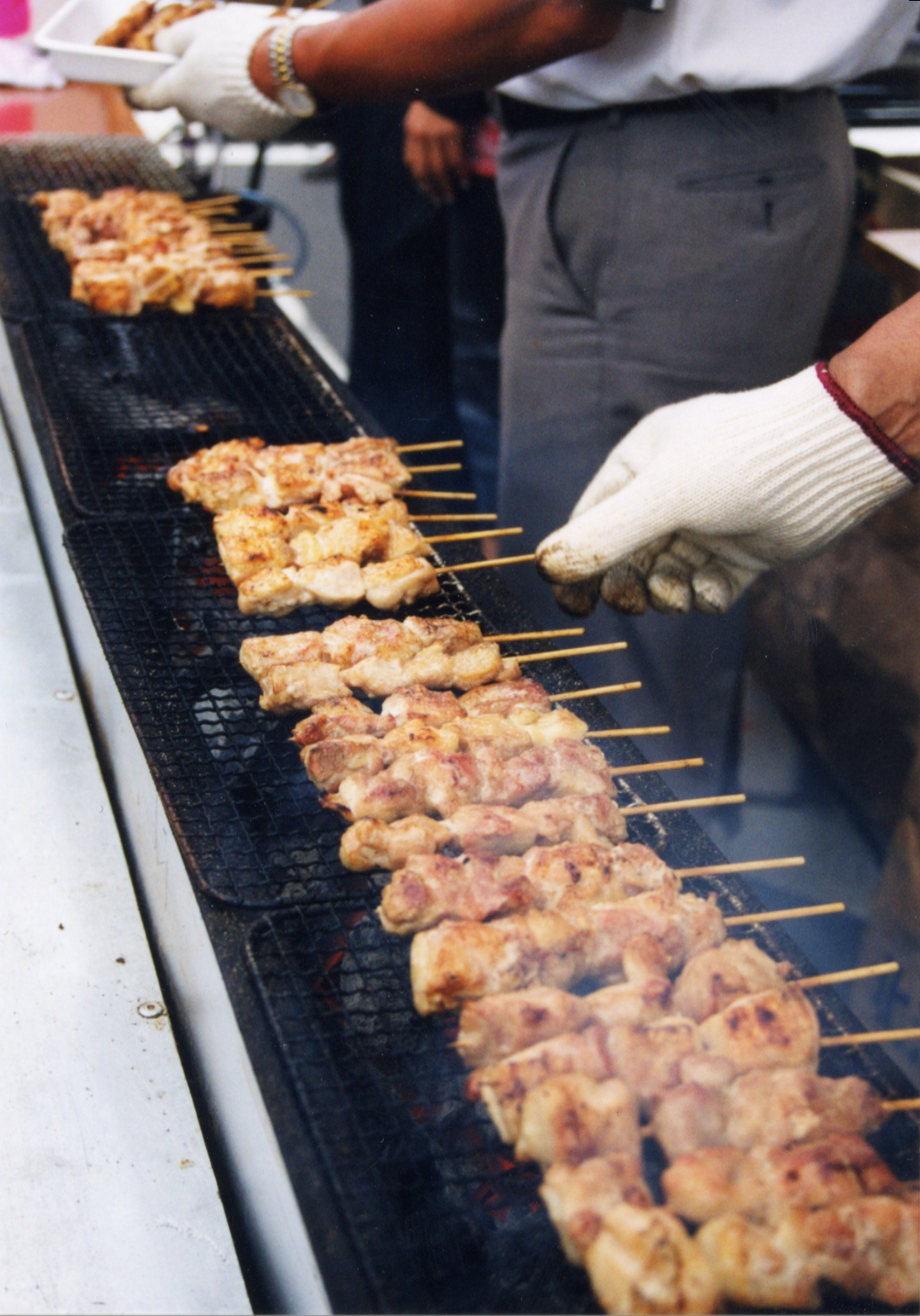
Yakitori being grilled

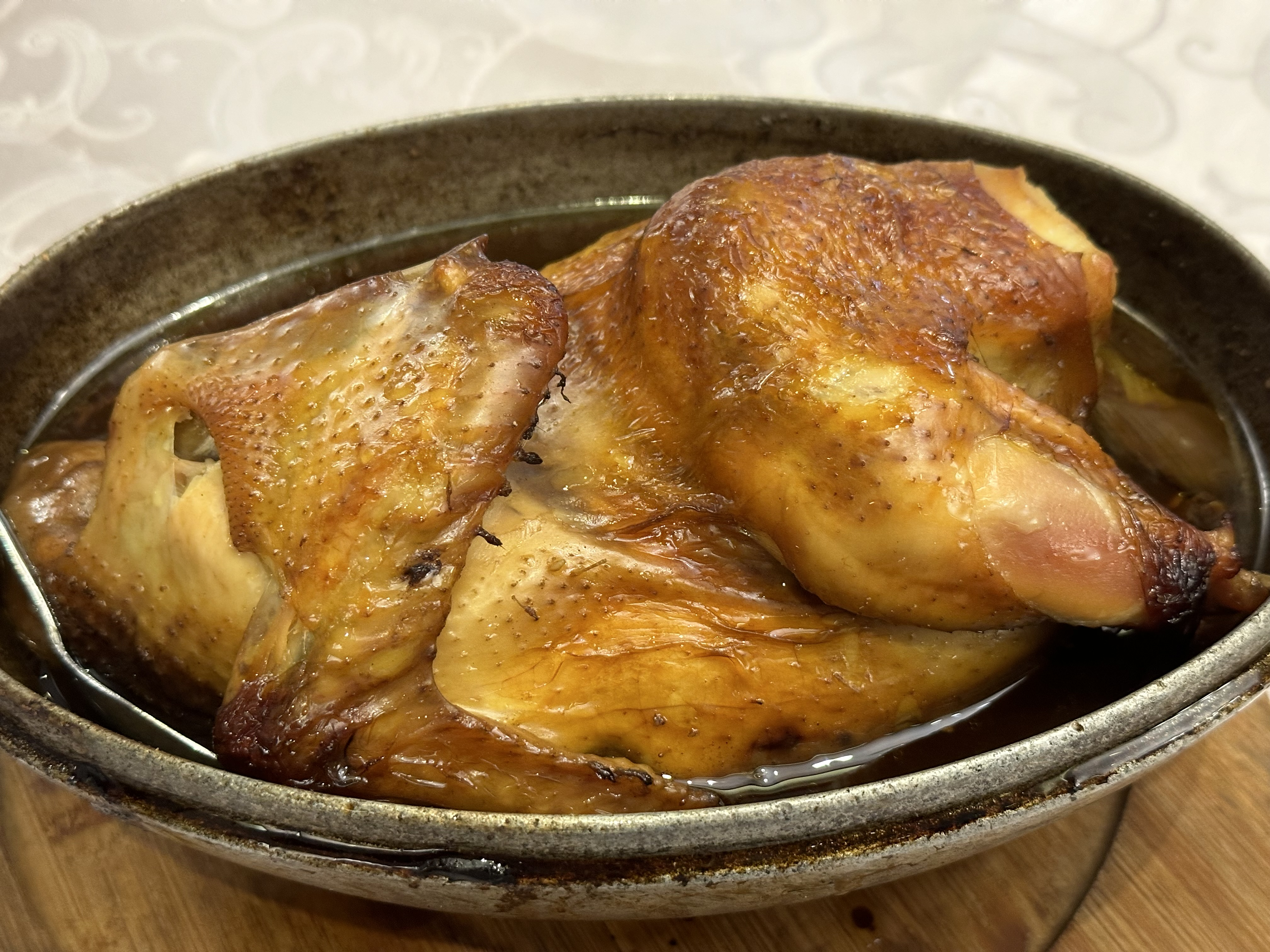
Beggar's Chicken

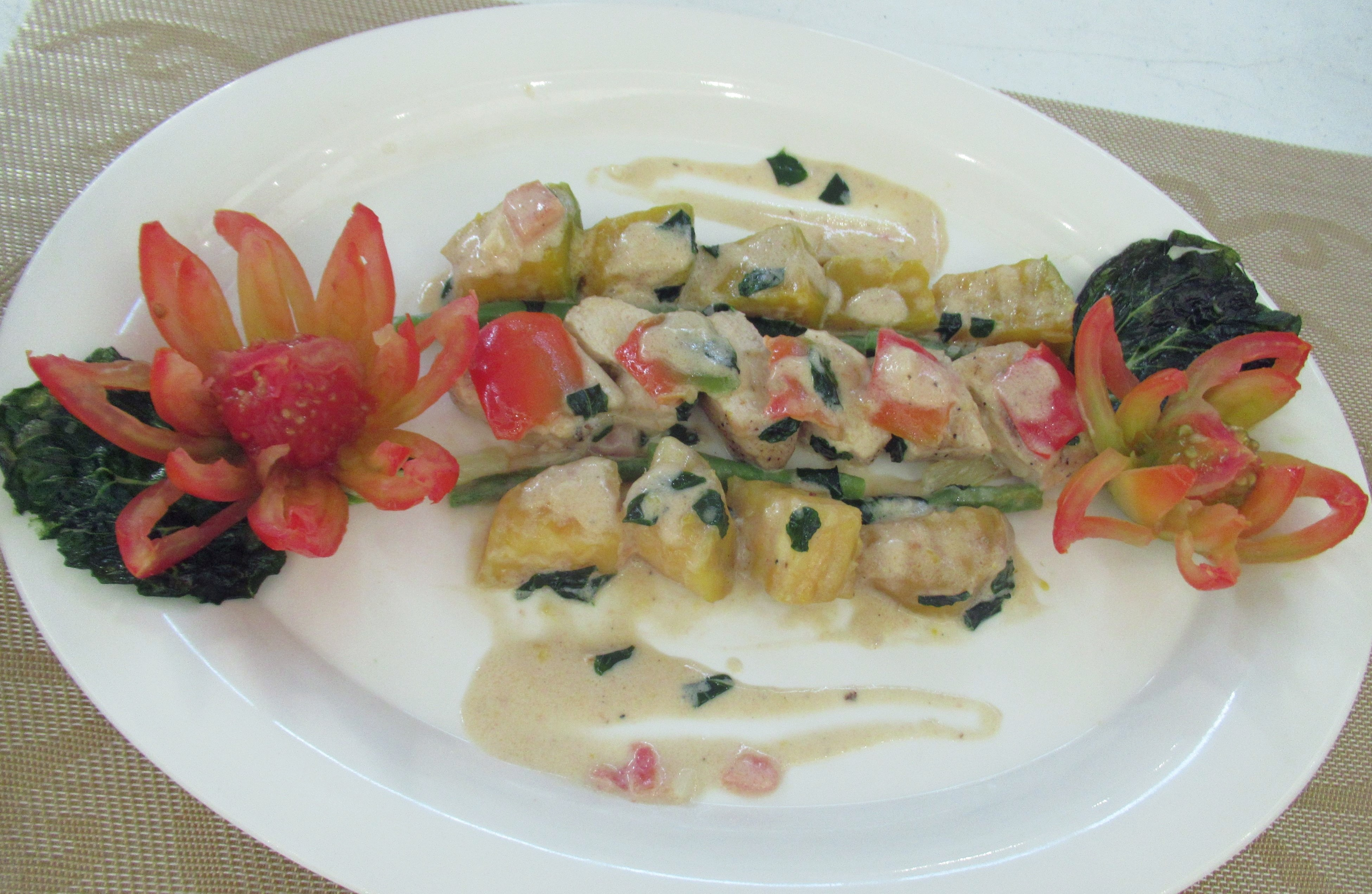
Chicken vegetable delight

== See also ==
- List of fried chicken dishes
- List of beef dishes
- List of egg dishes
- List of fast-food chicken restaurants
- List of fish dishes
- List of lamb dishes
- List of pork dishes
- List of seafood dishes
