= Mangalorean chicken sukka =

Indian chicken dish native to the Mangalore and Udupi regions

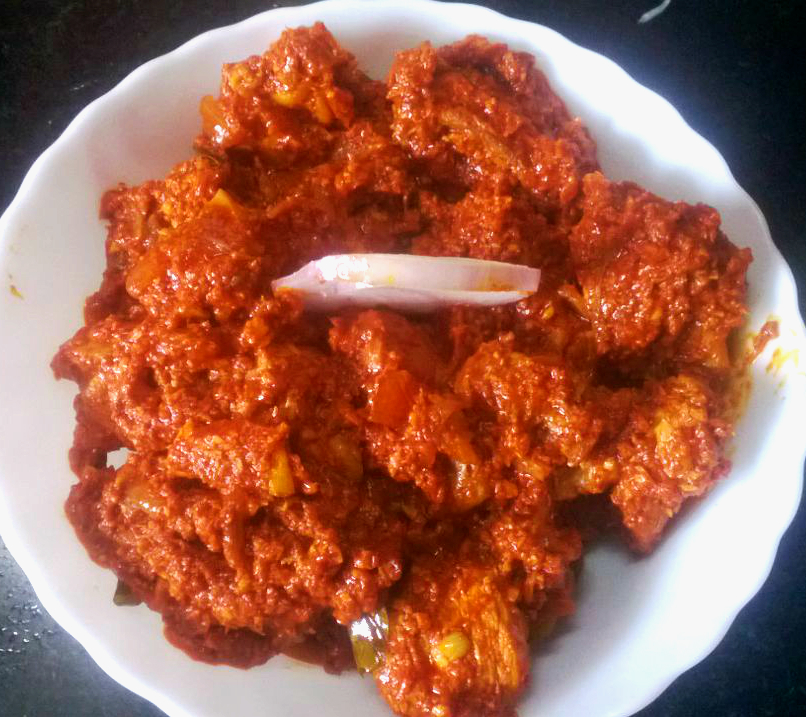
- Alternative names: Tulu: kori sukka, kori ajadina; English: chicken sukka
- Type: Curry
- Course: Main course
- Place of origin: India
- Region or state: Tulunadu
- Main ingredients: Chicken, grated coconut, red chillies
- Variations: Dry, semi-gravy

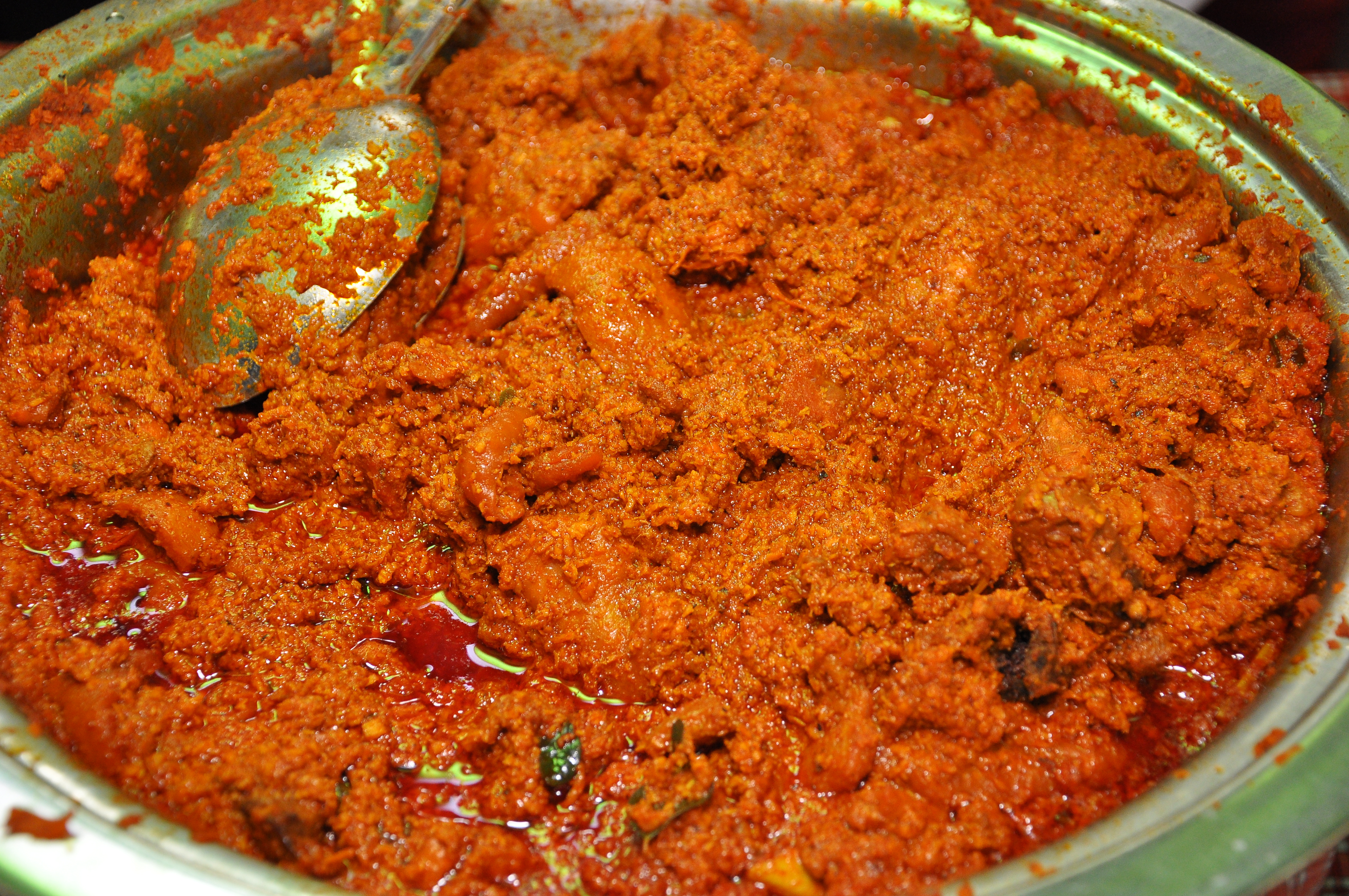
Chicken sukka semi-gravy

Mangalorean chicken sukka or kori sukka/kori ajadina (Tulu) is an Indian chicken dish native to the Mangalore and Udupi regions of Karnataka. The word "sukka" comes from the Hindi "sukha" which means "dry", sometimes also called "kori ajadina". However, it can be prepared in two variations: dry and semi-gravy.

== See also ==
- List of chicken dishes
- Kori rotti
