= Bourbon chicken =

Dish made with bourbon whiskey

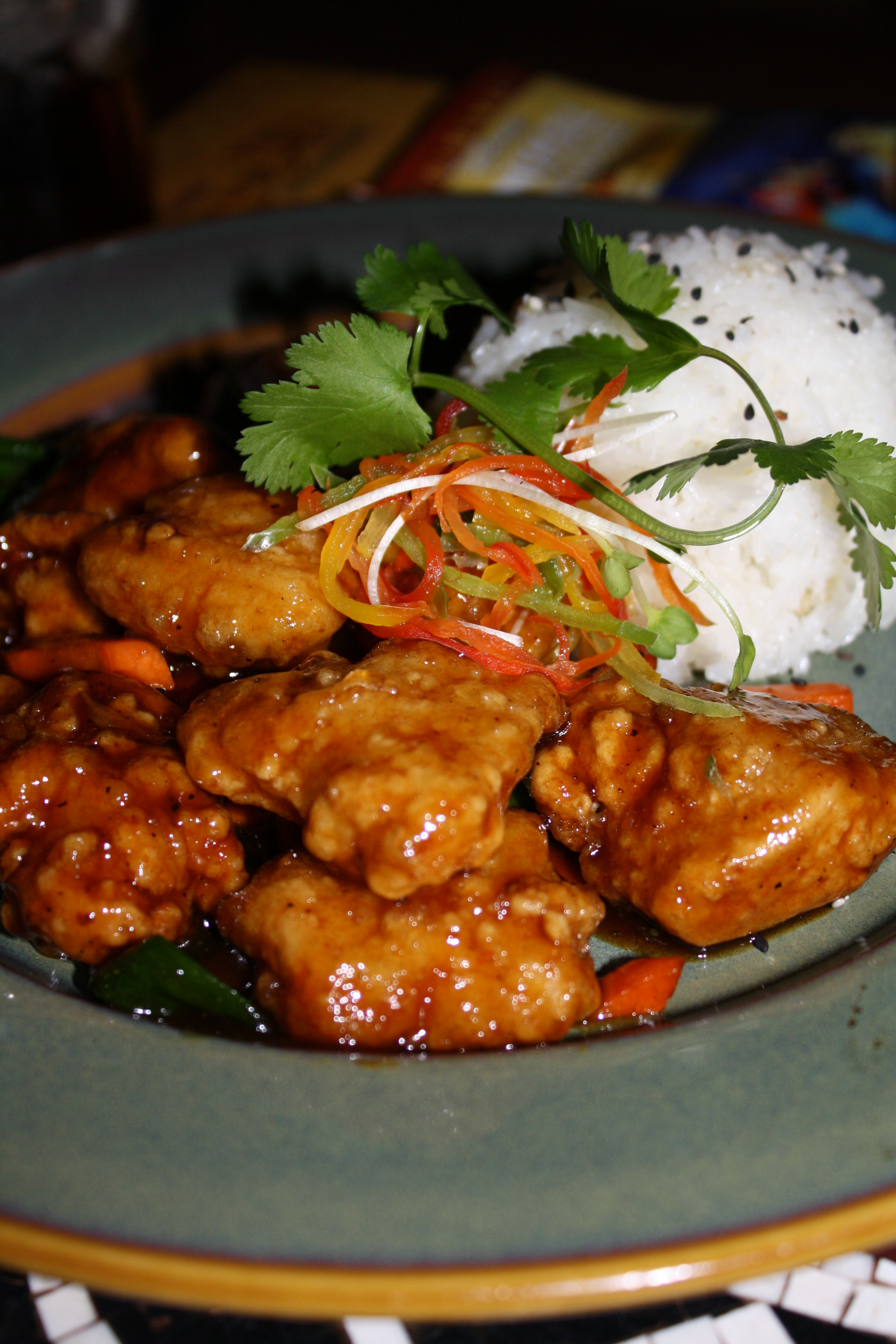
- Course: Main course
- Place of origin: United States
- Region or state: Bourbon Street, New Orleans, Louisiana
- Main ingredients: Chicken

Bourbon chicken is a dish named after Bourbon Street in New Orleans, Louisiana, and for the bourbon whiskey ingredient. The dish is commonly found at North American restaurants serving Cajun-themed or American Chinese cuisine.

The recipe includes soy sauce, brown sugar, ginger, and bourbon whiskey in the base, and the chicken is marinated in this sauce. Honey can also be used in the marinade.

== Name and origin ==
The name bourbon chicken comes from its place of creation, Bourbon Street in New Orleans. The name reflects this place, and there is no strict requirement for alcohol.

== Dishes ==
Bourbon chicken is chicken covered in a sweet and sticky sauce, but recipes use slightly different ingredients and cooking methods. Traditional mall-style recipe does not include bourbon. It uses chicken breast with a sauce made of brown sugar, soy sauce, apple juice, ketchup, vinegar, garlic, ginger, and red pepper flakes. The New Orleans version includes real bourbon, using dark meat chicken thighs and a glaze built with soy sauce, brown sugar, and sesame oil.

== See also ==
- Drunken chicken
- List of chicken dishes
