= Poulet au fromage =

French chicken and cheese dish

- Place of origin: France
- Main ingredients: Chicken, flour, salt, pepper, oil or butter, white wine, sauce (cheese–often Emmenthal or Gruyère, egg yolks, crème fraîche, nutmeg)

Poulet au fromage ([pulɛ o fʁɔmaːʒ]) is a French dish: the English translation being "chicken with cheese".

== Ingredients ==
Pieces of chicken are coated with flour, salt and pepper, and then sautéed. Some recipes call for various types of cooking oil, some call for butter, and some call for both. Some recipes call for sauteing an onion with the chicken. After the chicken is browned, white wine is added to the cooking pan. Some recipes call for leaving the chicken in the pan while the wine is reduced, while others call for first removing the chicken, then using the wine to deglaze the pan, and then pouring the wine sauce over the chicken.

The chicken and wine, combined in a dish, are then baked, after which a sauce made of cheese (often Emmenthal or Gruyère or both), egg yolks, and crème fraîche is poured over it. The sauce often contains a sprinkle of nutmeg, a pinch of thyme, parsley, garlic, or a bay leaf.

Some recipes call for garnishment with capers, and /or flavoring using lardons.

Poulet au fromage is served with white wine, and often bread and salad.

== See also ==
- List of chicken dishes
