= Brown stew chicken =

Caribbean stew dish

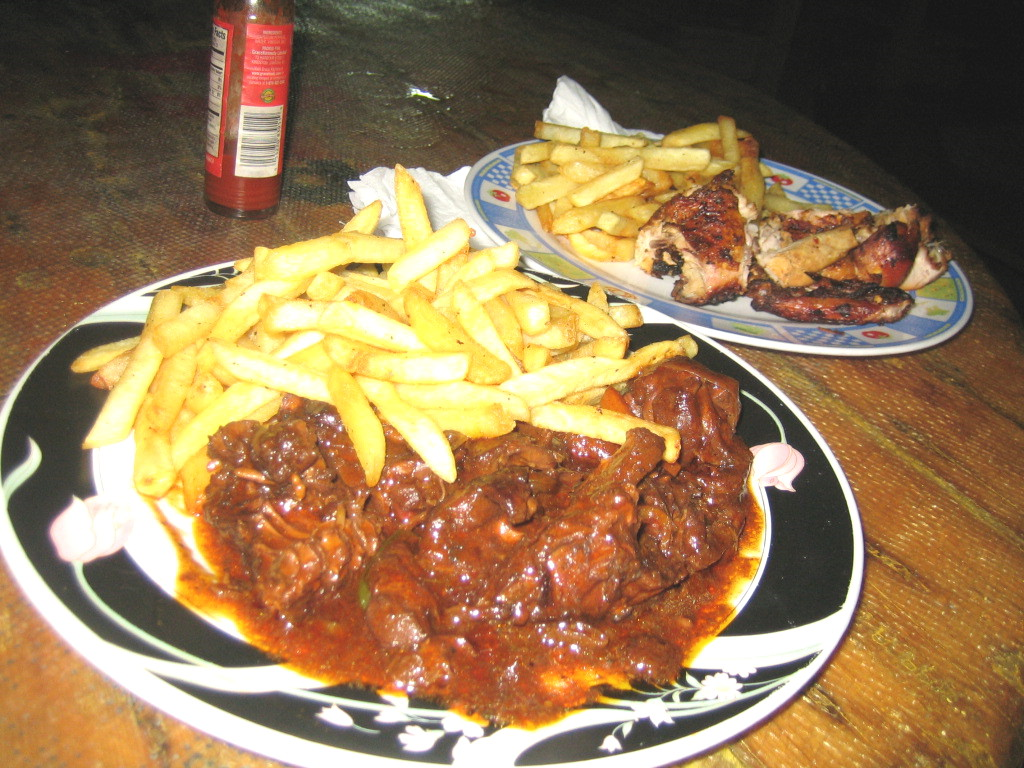
- Brown stew and jerk chicken served with a side of french fries
- Type: Stew
- Course: Main course
- Place of origin: Caribbean islands
- Region or state: Caribbean
- Serving temperature: Warm or hot
- Main ingredients: Chicken, Scotch bonnet peppers, onions, carrots

Brown stew chicken is a meat dish eaten throughout the English-speaking Caribbean islands. Some countries in the Caribbean use this name interchangeably with another popular dish referred to as stew chicken that has a different recipe. Brown stew chicken is usually paired with rice and peas and eaten as dinner, preferably on Sundays. The eponymous chicken color is achieved by frying chicken to a deep brown color, after which it is cooked in a slow simmer with spices, carrots, and ketchup.

== See also ==
- Jamaican cuisine
- Caribbean cuisine
- List of chicken dishes
- List of stews
