= Pollo al disco =

Argentine chicken dish

- Course: Main meal
- Place of origin: Argentina
- Region or state: Northwest
- Serving temperature: Hot
- Main ingredients: chicken, corn, peas, tomatoes, carrots

Pollo al disco (literally, "chicken in the disc") is a hearty Argentine dish consisting of chicken and various vegetables cooked as a stew in an uncovered deep pan over an open fire. "Disco" refers to the pan used to cook the chicken, which is usually around 24 inches in diameter and at least 6 inches deep. It is unknown where and when pollo al disco originated, but it is thought that the first pollo al disco was cooked using a disused plow disk in a rural area of Buenos Aires province. It remains a popular meal for parties and other gatherings.

== See also ==
- List of chicken dishes
