= Airline chicken =

Boneless chicken breast with drumette

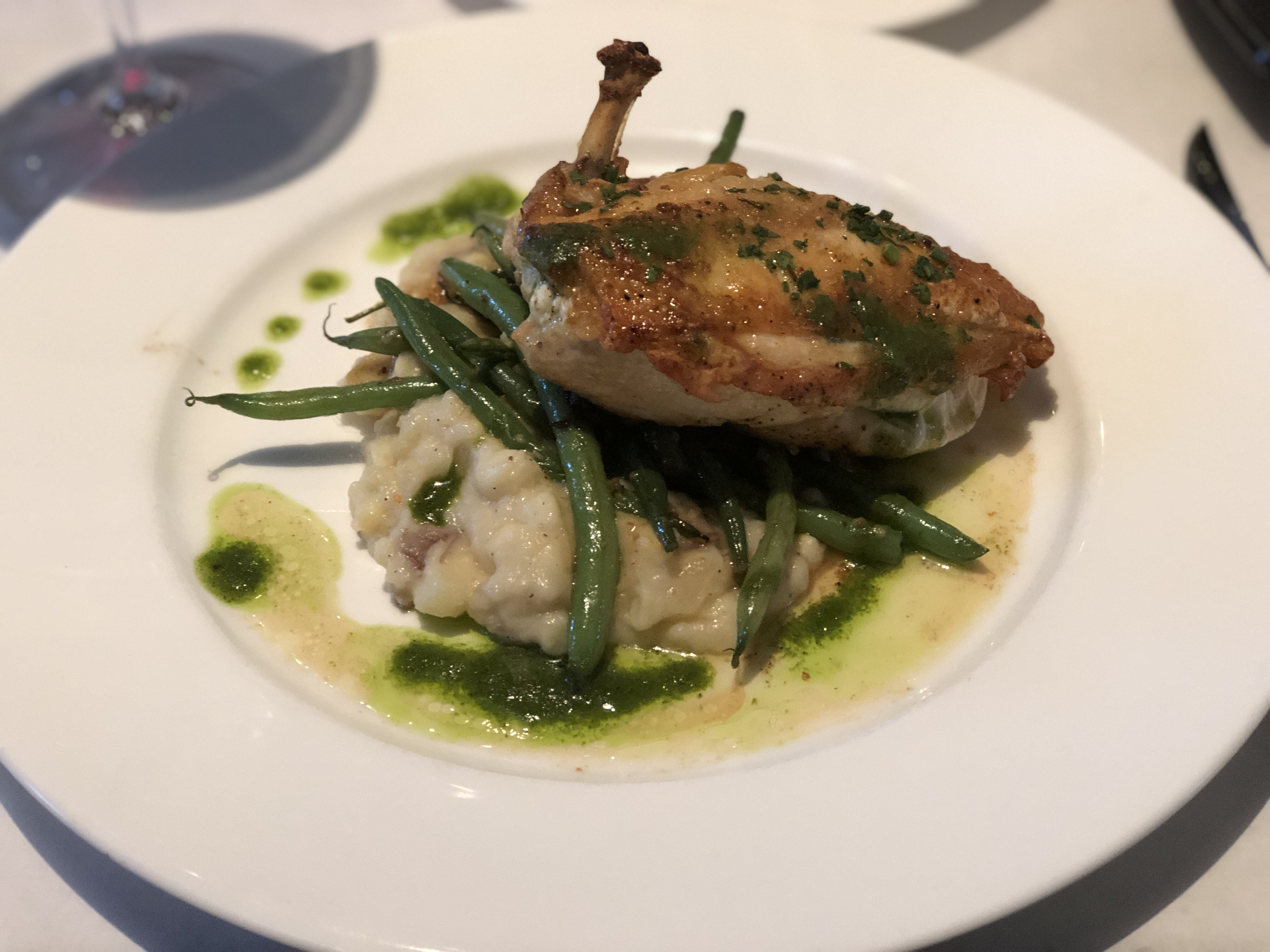
Airline chicken with mashed potatoes, corn, green beans and a basil olive oil dressing

Airline chicken or airline chicken breast is a cut of chicken composed of the boneless chicken breast with the drumette attached. The breast is skin-on, and the first wing joint and tendon are attached while the rest of the breast is boneless. The cut is intended to contribute to the presentation of the final dish by providing visual interest.

The name of the cut is variously attributed to the shape resembling an airplane wing or that, because the exposed bone could be used as a handle to pick up the entire piece and eat it out of hand, it made it easier to eat in-flight. It is typically a specialty cut.

The cut is also known as a Frenched breast, due to the end of the wing bone being trimmed or Frenched, or chicken supreme. It is also known as Statler chicken, a name that originated from the Statler Hotel Boston, built in 1927 by E.M. Statler.

== See also ==
- List of chicken dishes
