= Chicken Lahori =

Pakistani curry dish

Chicken Lahori is a Pakistani curry which originated in the eastern city of Lahore, Pakistan. Served with rice, chicken Lahori is a popular street food.

== Preparation ==
Oil is heated in a large pan or wok, and whole spices are sautéed, including black and green cardamom, cumin seeds, bay leaves, coriander, and turmeric, in addition to garlic and onion. In these spices, the chicken is stewed in yogurt, served with basmati rice, and garnished with fresh coriander and garam masala.

== See also ==
- List of chicken dishes
- Pakistani cuisine
- Pakistani meat dishes
