= Spicy chicken sandwich =

Sandwich made with chicken

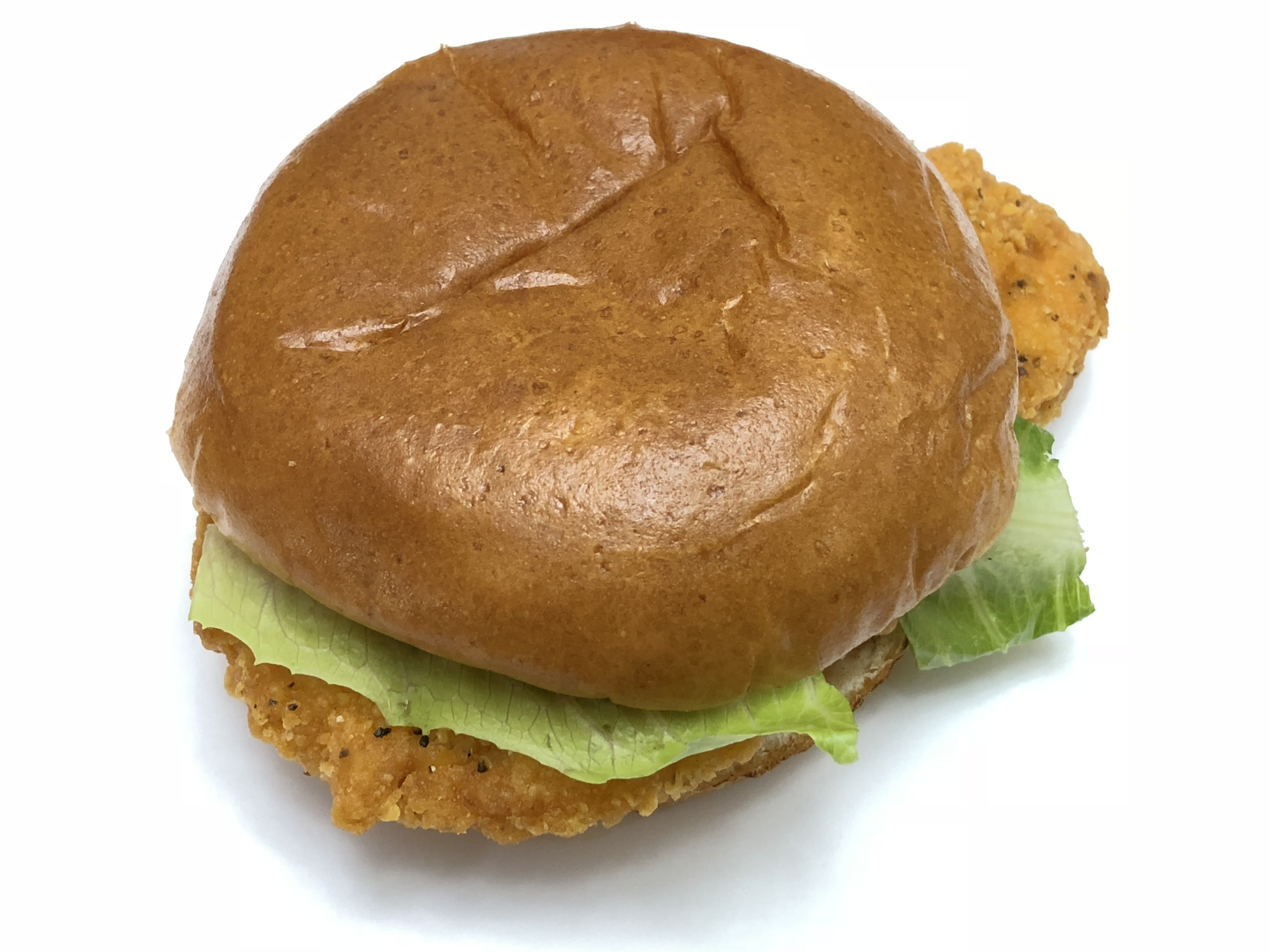
- Spicy chicken sandwich from Wendy's
- Place of origin: America
- Main ingredients: Chicken

A spicy chicken sandwich is a sandwich made of a boneless white breast of chicken whose breading is seasoned with a spicy blend of peppers and spices. Common seasonings include garlic powder, onion powder, oregano, smoked paprika, cayenne, salt, cracked pepper, jalapeno juice, and crushed red pepper flakes, which are stirred into the bread crumbs.

The chicken can be brined if desired and then dipped in hot sauce and/or buttermilk and egg, breaded with the flour, cornstarch, bread crumbs, spices, etc.; and then either baked, pressure cooked, or fried in such oils as peanut oil or canola oil. A smoky, chili pepper sauce or sriracha mayo or a spread with such ingredients as mayonnaise, Dijon sauce, lemon juice, celery seeds, pickle juice, hot sauce, and freshly ground black pepper, may be used. Commonly the chicken sandwich is served on a kaiser roll with such toppings as mayo, iceberg lettuce, tomato, shredded cabbage, bread and butter pickle slices, coleslaw, or Monterey Jack cheese.

Spicy chicken sandwiches were a menu item at various independent restaurants by the 1980s. They were popularized nationally by Wendy's, which offered the item on a seasonal basis in various regions starting in 1992 and added it to its permanent menu in 1996. Since then, similar sandwiches have been offered by many other American fast food restaurant chains, including Roy Rogers, Chick-fil-A, and Popeyes.

== See also ==
- List of chicken dishes
