= Ostropel =

Romanian stew

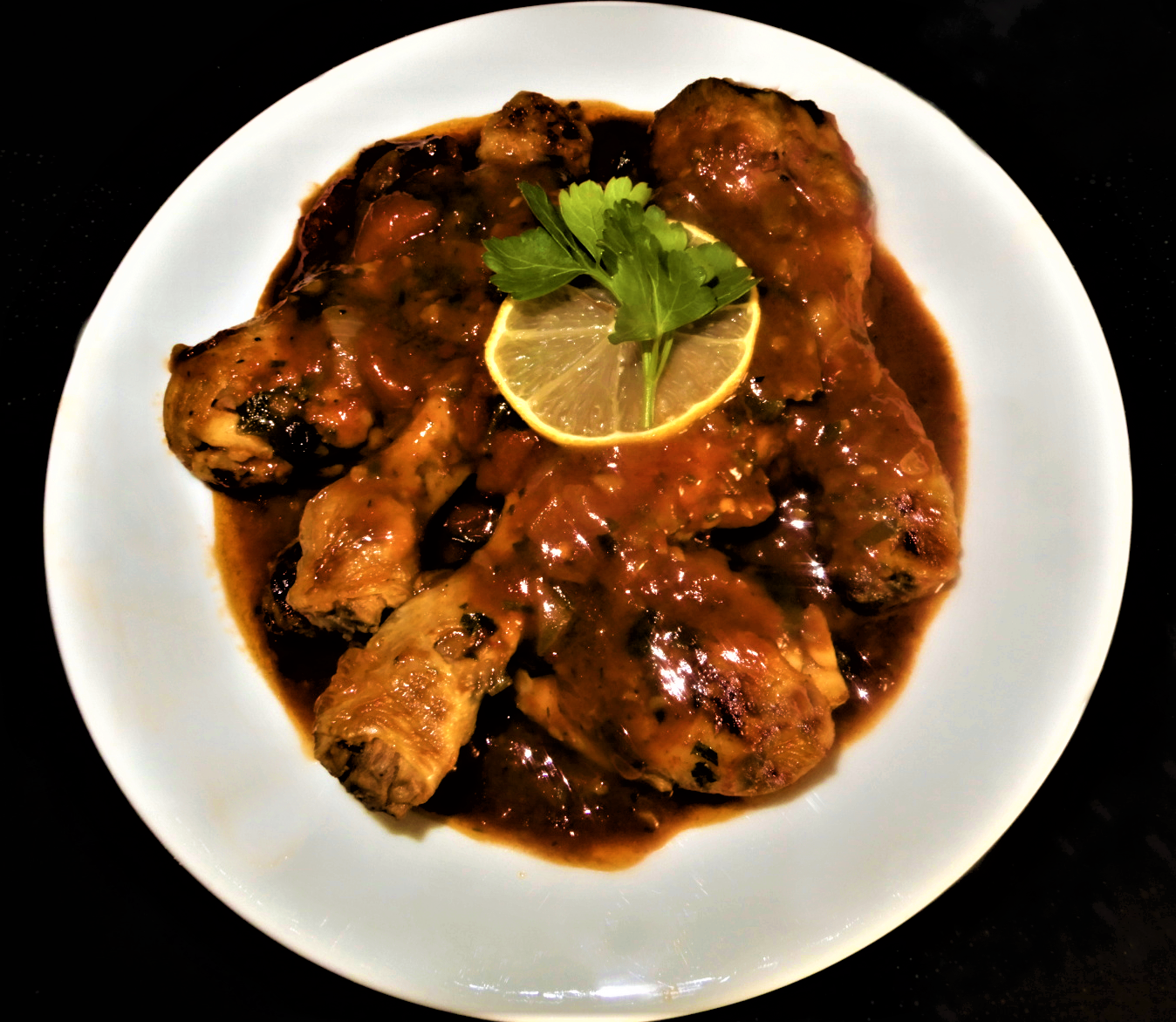
- Type: Stew
- Place of origin: Romania
- Main ingredients: Chicken (or rabbit, lamb, or other types of meat), tomato sauce, garlic or spring onions

Ostropel is a typical Romanian stew that is primarily made from chicken mixed with a thick tomato sauce. Additionally, garlic or spring onions can be added to the dish. Rabbit, lamb, or other types of meat are also sometimes used and, alternatively, vegetarian versions can be made during fasting periods.

Mămăligă (polenta) is typically used as a side dish, together with a light salad.

== Variations ==
Like many Romanian dishes, the ostropel has regional variations. For example, in Moldova, the recipe is rather simple, without many other ingredients added to the sauce. In Oltenia, carrots and vinegar are added to the sauce, and the final dish is served with boiled potatoes instead of mămăligă.

== See also ==
- List of chicken dishes
- List of stews
