= Moo goo gai pan =

Americanized version of a Cantonese dish

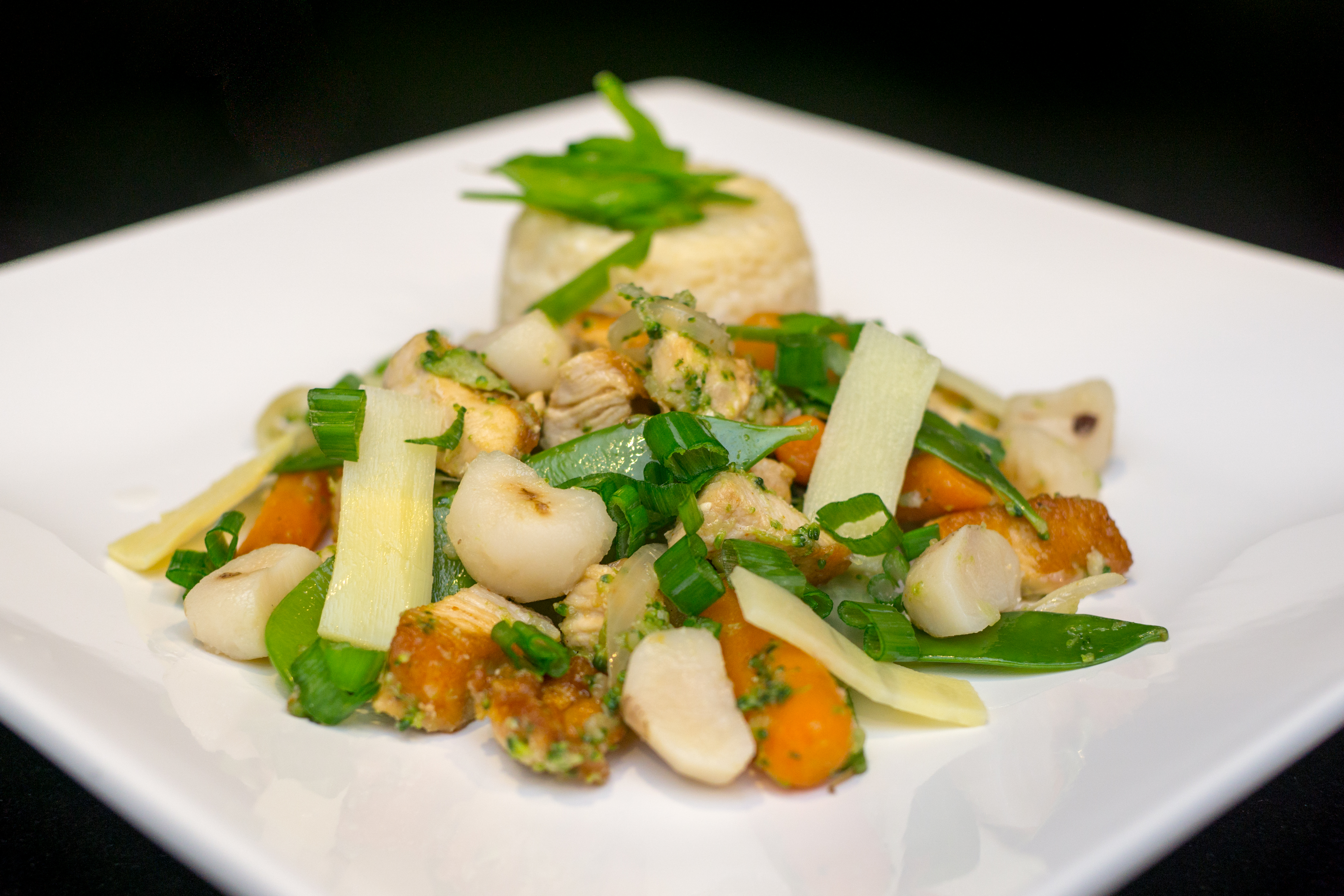
- Traditional Chinese: 蘑菇雞片
- Simplified Chinese: 蘑菇鸡片
- Literal meaning: "Mushroom chicken slices"
Transcriptions
Standard Mandarin
- Hanyu Pinyin: mógū jīpiàn
Wu
- Wugniu: mu^{2} ku^{1} ci^{1} phie^{5}
Yue: Cantonese
- Yale Romanization: mòhgū gāipin
- Jyutping: mo^{4} gu^{1} gai^{1} pin^{3}

Moo goo gai pan (Chinese: 蘑菇雞片; Jyutping: mo^{4} gu^{1} gai^{1} pin^{3}) is the Americanized version of a Cantonese dish – chicken with mushroom in oyster sauce (香菇雞片), which can be a stir-fry dish or a dish made in a clay pot. The Chinese-American version is a simple stir-fried dish with thinly sliced chicken, white button mushrooms, and other vegetables. The word pan 片 means thin slices, referring to the way that the chicken is cut. Popular vegetable additions include bok choy, snow peas, bamboo shoots, shiitake mushrooms, water chestnuts, carrots, and/or Chinese cabbage (napa cabbage).

== Etymology ==
The name comes from the Cantonese names of the ingredients (note that tone marks here do not match Mandarin tones):

- moo goo (蘑菇; mòhgū): 'button mushrooms'
- gai (雞; gāi): 'chicken'
- pan (片; pín): 'slices'

== In popular culture ==
In the 1975 Thanksgiving episode of The Bob Newhart Show, titled "Over the River and Through the Woods", the characters repeatedly attempt to order moo goo gai pan while intoxicated.

The dish's name is parodied in the title of an episode of The Simpsons, "Goo Goo Gai Pan", in which Selma Bouvier travels to China to adopt a child.

== See also ==
- List of chicken dishes
