= Chicken tabaka =

Georgian pan-fried chicken dish

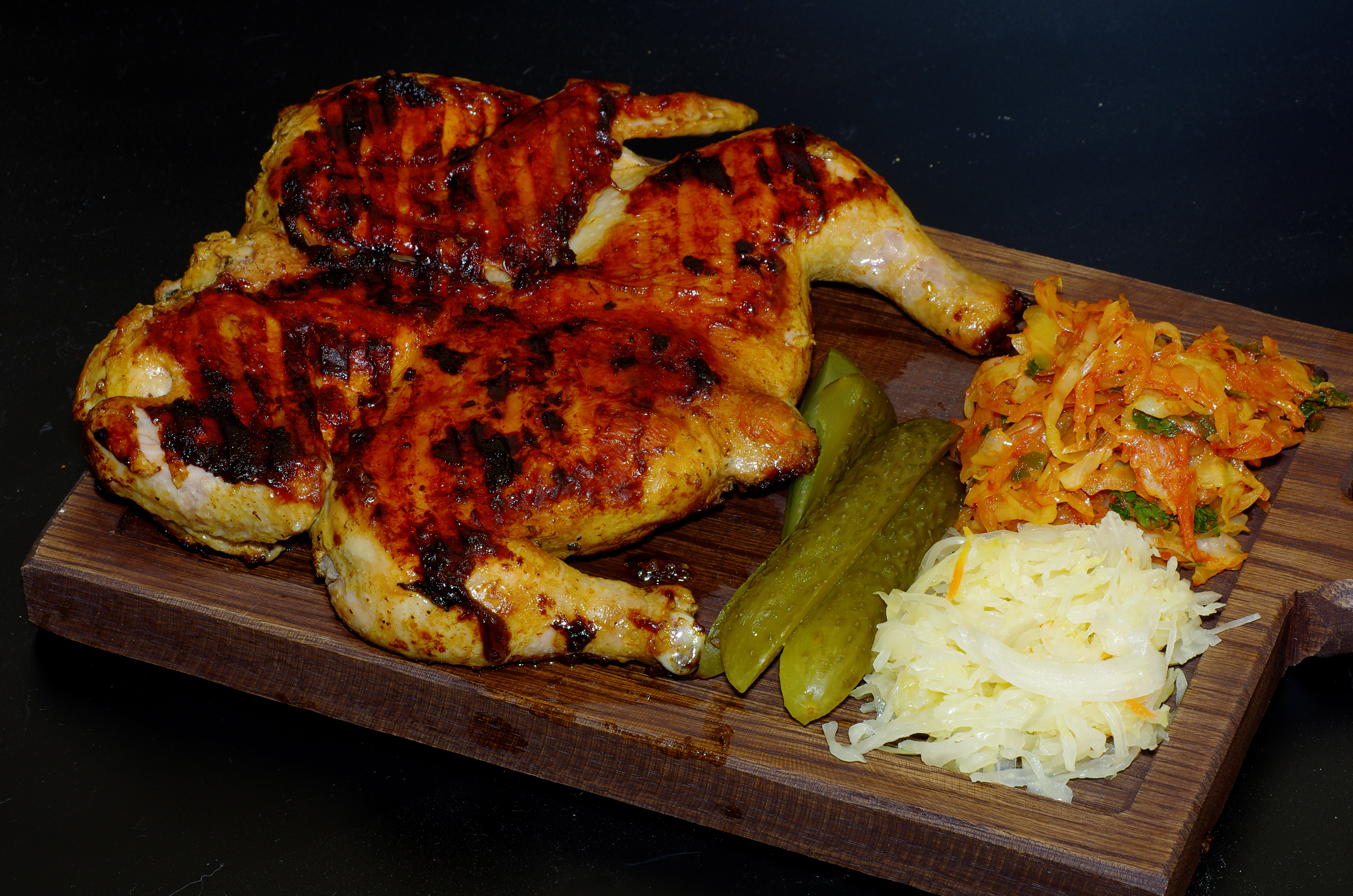
- Place of origin: Georgia
- Region or state: Caucasus, Eastern Europe, Central Asia

Chicken tabaka (Georgian: წიწილა ტაბაკა, romanized: ts'its'ila t'abak'a) or chicken tapaka (Georgian: წიწილა ტაფაკა, romanized: ts'its'ila t'apak'a) is a traditional Georgian dish of a pan-fried chicken which is also popular in other Caucasian cuisines. It also became a common restaurant dish in the Soviet cuisine and is found nowadays in many restaurants throughout Eastern Europe and Central Asia.

The chicken is fried in a traditional frying pan called tapa (Georgian: ტაფა). For frying thoroughly, the chicken is flattened out on the pan and pressed by a weight. In modern cookery, special pan sets with a heavy cover or with a screw press are often used.

Chicken tabaka is often seasoned with garlic or dressed with traditional Georgian sauces, such as bazhe, satsivi or tkemali.

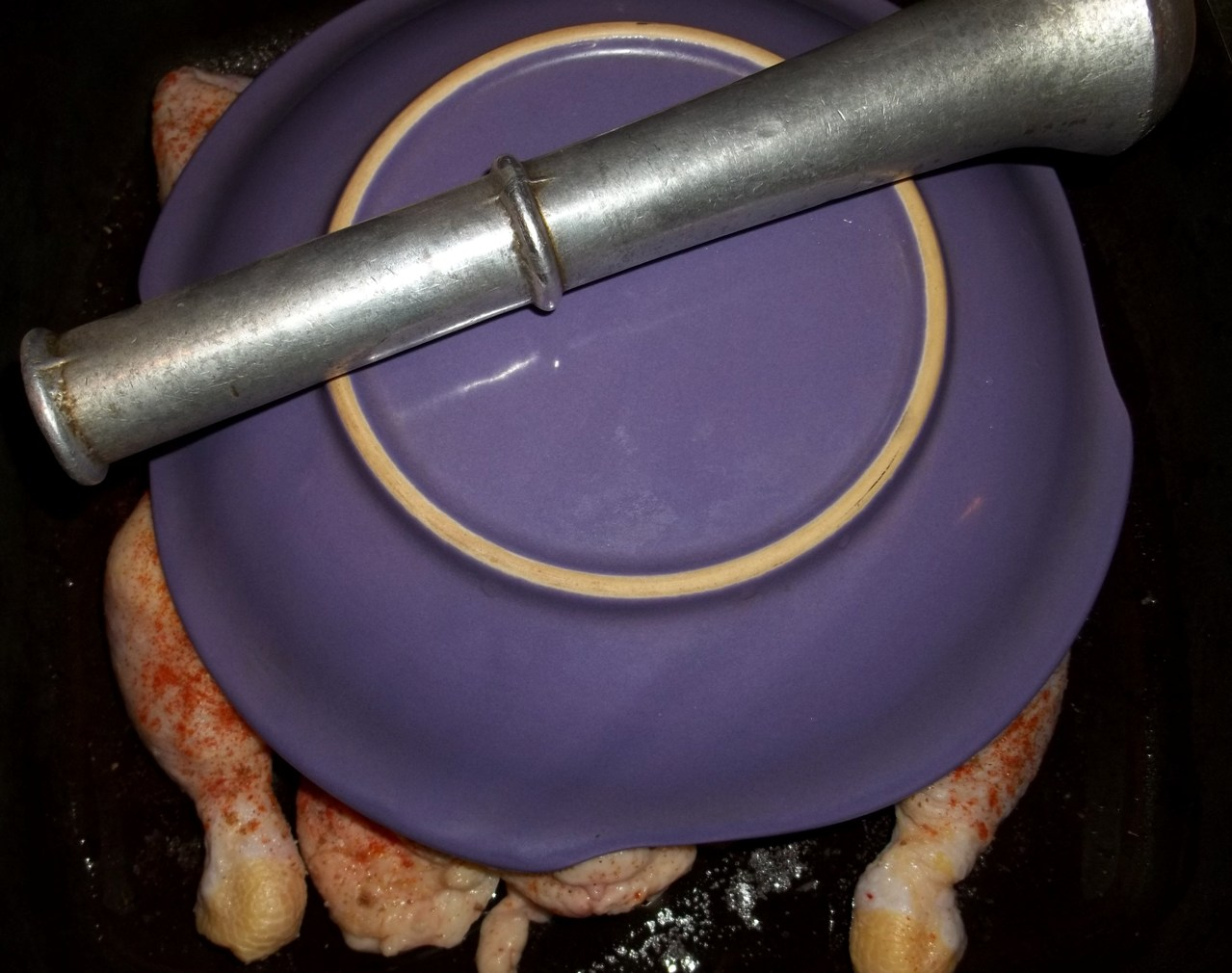
Weighing down the chicken on the pan

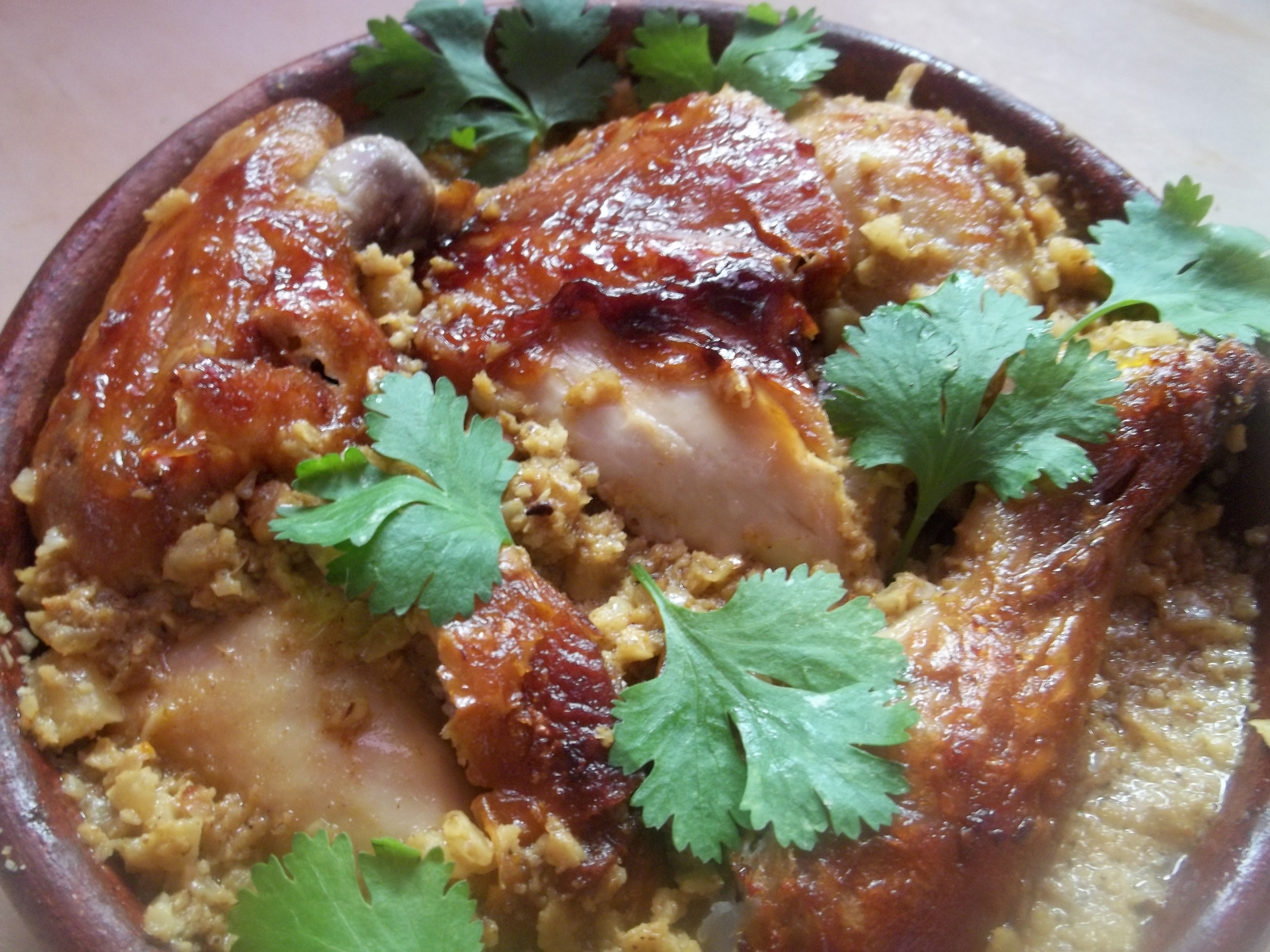
Chicken tapaka with hazelnut sauce

== See also ==
- List of chicken dishes
- Chicken as food
