= Plecing ayam =

Traditional food from Indonesia

Plecing ayam is a chicken dish from Lombok in Indonesia. The chicken is sliced and baked, then marinated in oil, chilli pepper, garlic, spring onions, shrimp paste and limes, and finally grilled.

== See also ==
- List of chicken dishes

== Indonesia ==
Ayam kecap recipe can be cooked dry and some are gravy, depending on taste and seasoning used.
