= Bamboo chicken =

South Asian chicken curry dish

Bongu chicken
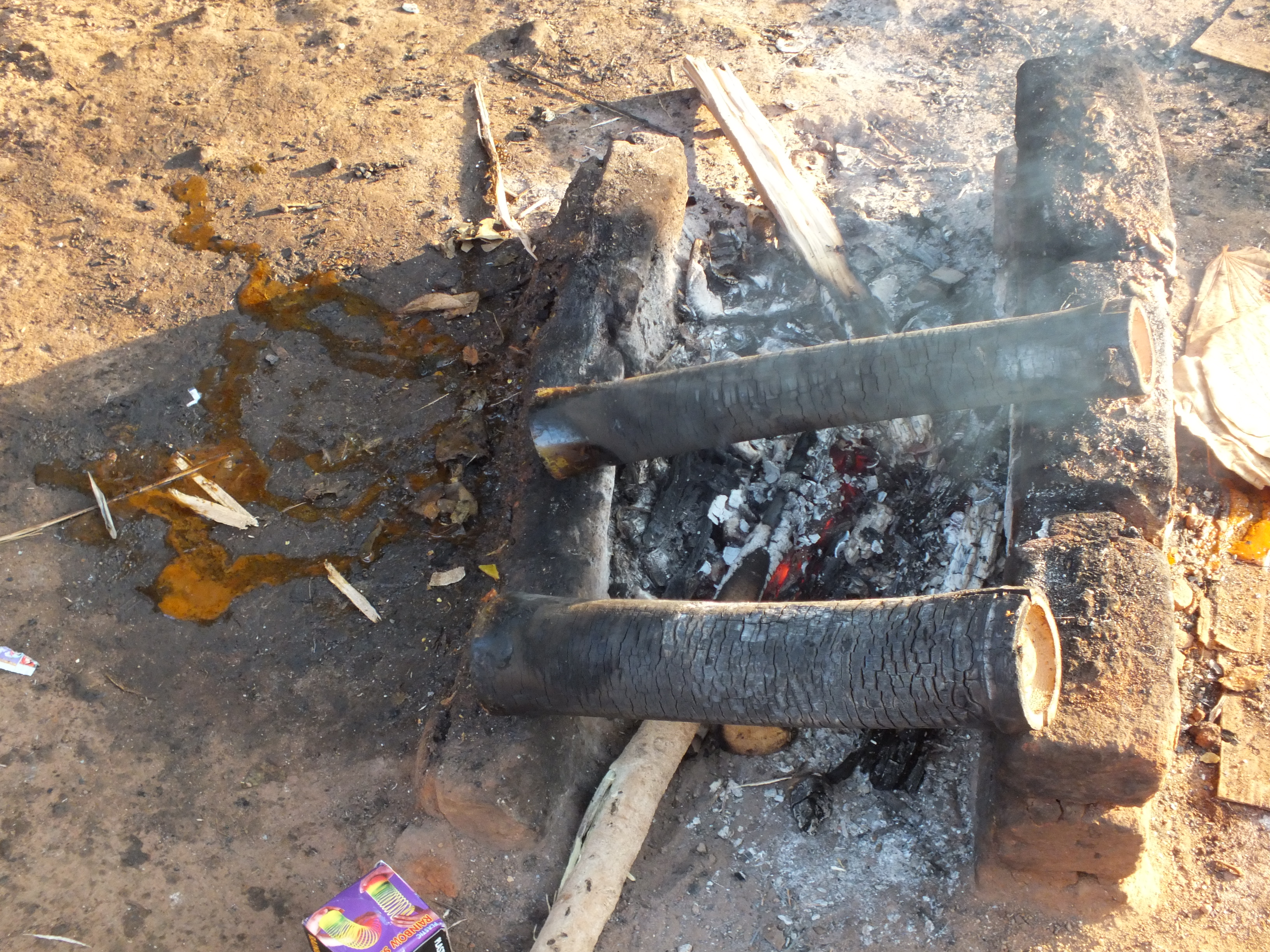
- Place of origin: India
- Region or state: Andhra Pradesh
- Main ingredients: Chicken, bamboo, Indian spices

Bamboo chicken (also bongu chicken or bongulo chicken) is a traditional chicken dish prepared by stuffing marinated chicken into hollow bamboo segments and roasting them over an open charcoal fire. Originating from the tribal communities of the Eastern Ghats, it has become a signature culinary attraction in Maredumilli and Araku Valley in the Alluri Sitharama Raju district of Andhra Pradesh, India.

== Preparation ==
The oil-free cooking process and the infusion of the bamboo's natural moisture are key ingredients of this dish.

- Marination: Raw chicken pieces are coated in a blend of local spices, including ginger-garlic paste, green chilies, turmeric, and salt. Little to no oil is used.
- Stuffing: The marinated meat is packed into fresh green bamboo stalks.
- Sealing: The ends of the bamboo segments are plugged with sal leaves or palm leaves to trap the steam inside.
- Cooking: The stalks are placed directly onto charcoal flames and rotated for 45–60 minutes. The bamboo exterior chars, but the internal moisture steams the chicken, making it tender and aromatic.

== Cultural significance ==
Originally a staple of the Konda Reddi and Bagata tribes, Bongu chicken was a practical way for forest dwelling communities to cook without metal utensils. Today, it serves as a vital source of eco tourism income for local tribal youth. The dish is celebrated for being oil-free, appealing to health conscious travellers visiting the hill stations of Andhra Pradesh.

== See also ==
- List of chicken dishes
- Andhra cuisine
