= Kori rotti =

Spicy dish from India

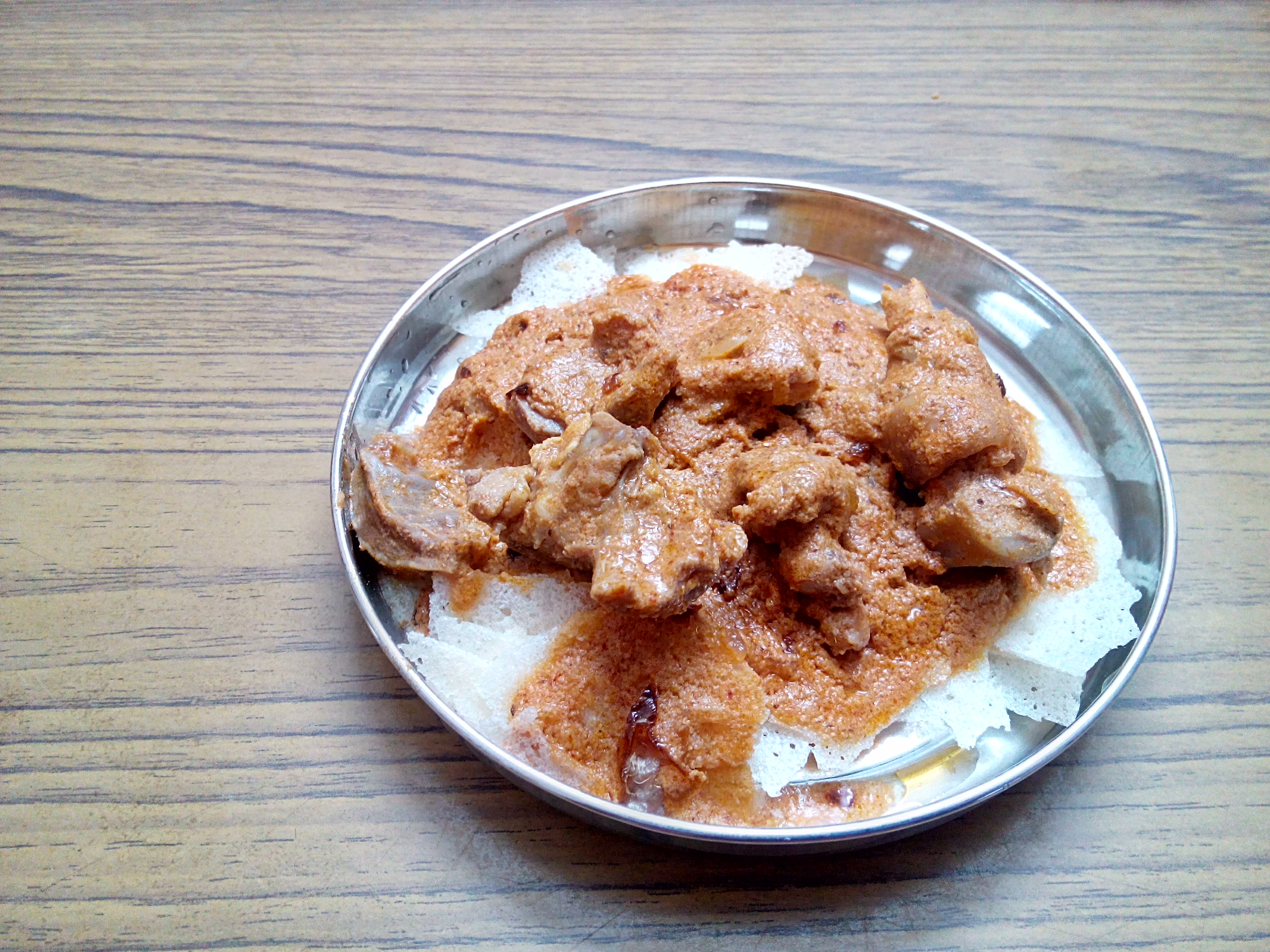
- Alternative names: Kori rutti
- Course: Main
- Place of origin: Tulunadu
- Region or state: Tulunadu, India

Kori rotti is a spicy dish of the Tulu Udupi-Mangalorean cuisine of India. It is an authentic dish of Tuluvas from Tulunadu. Kori rotti is a compulsory dish on Sundays and special occasions in Tulunadu homes. It is a combination of red chili and coconut milk-based chicken curry and crisp, dry wafers made from boiled rice. Kori means chicken in Tulu.

== See also ==
- List of chicken dishes
- Udupi cuisine
