= Chigirtma =

Azerbaijani egg dish

Chigirtma, Çığırtma
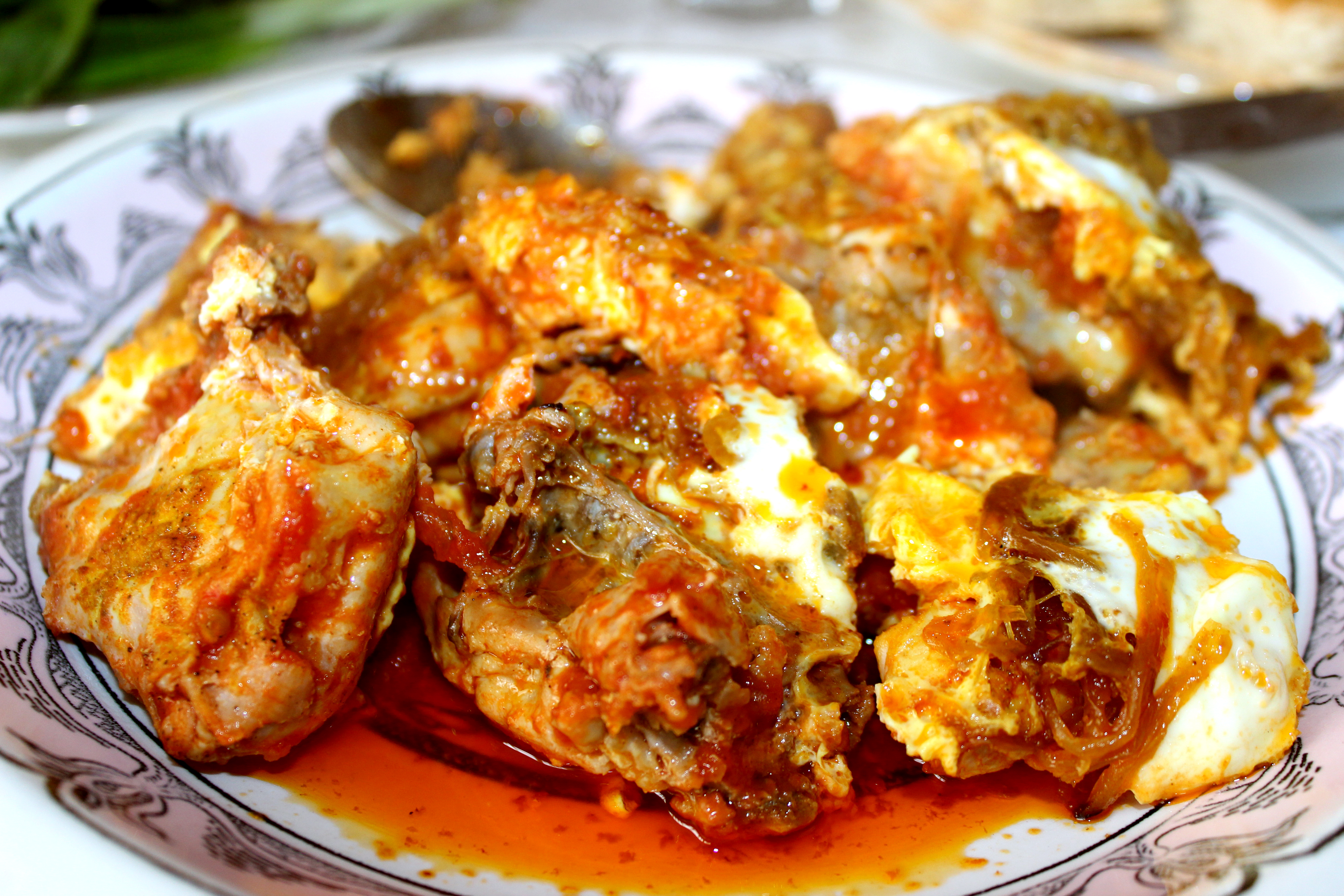
- Region or state: Azerbaijan
- Serving temperature: Hot

Chigirtma (Azerbaijani: çığırtma) is an egg dish of Azerbaijani cuisine. The name chigirtma (çığırtma) means that it includes eggs. Chigirtma literally means in Azerbaijani “screaming”. It is believed that the dish is called so because of the sounds the meat (or vegetable) makes while cooking in hot oil.

== Types ==
=== Chicken ===
The main ingredients of chicken chigirtma (Azerbaijani: toyuq çığırtması) are chicken, onions, lemon water, eggs, vegetable oil or melted butter and spices.

==== Preparation ====
The chicken is boiled, then placed in the pan and chopped fried onions, lemon juice, spices are added on it. A little broth is poured before simmering 20 minutes. Eggs are added to the chicken and cooked until the dish is done. Chicken-chigirtma can be served with plain plov which is known as chigirtma-plov.

=== Green bean ===
Green beans, onions, eggs, dill, vegetable oil and spices are used in the preparation of green bean chigirtma (Azerbaijani: lobya çığırtması). Beans are cut into small pieces and boiled. Eggs, chopped dill and spices are mixed in a bowl and then added to the fried onions with cooked beans. The dish is served with sarimsagli gatig (yogurt with crushed garlic).

=== Eggplant ===
The main ingredients of badimjan (eggplant) chighirtma are eggplants, onions, melted butter, eggs, parsley and spices. Sliced eggplants are salted and pressed to remove its bitter juice. Eggplants are added to fried onions and is cooked, then eggs are added. Melted butter and greens are added before serving.

=== Forcemeat ===
Forcemeat chigirtma (Azerbaijani: qiymə çığırtması) is made with forcemeat from mutton, onions, melted butter, saffron and eggs. Chopped dill is added before serving.

=== Spinach ===
Spinach, sorrel, onions, eggs and melted butter are the main ingredients of ispanag (spinach) chigirtma. Soured milk and chopped parsley are served with this dish.

=== Ganja ===
This version of chigirtma is specific to Ganja city of Azerbaijan. The dish is made with mutton, onions, melted butter, tomatoes, greens (coriander and dill), and spices. Meat is cooked in its broth in a deep pan. Separately fried onions and eggs are added when the meat is done. The mixture is simmered until eggs are done. Tomatoes and greens are added before serving. Ganja chigirtma is served with soured milk.
