= Offshore powerboat racing in New Orleans =

Offshore powerboat racing started in New Orleans, Louisiana in 1980. Races have been held in either Lake Pontchartrain or on the Mississippi River.

New Orleans was also the home port for the Popeyes Offshore race team from 1980 to 1990. The race team was formed by Al Copeland Sr., the founder of Popeyes Famous Fried Chicken & Biscuits Restaurants and Copeland's Restaurants. He was a six-time U.S. national champion and world champion in 1985 and 1986.

Year	Series	Race	Place
1980	American Power Boat Association	Halter 200	Lake Pontchartrain, New Orleans, Louisiana
1981	American Power Boat Association	New Orleans (Open and Prod)	Lake Pontchartrain, New Orleans, Louisiana
1981	American Power Boat Association	Halter 200	Lake Pontchartrain, New Orleans, Louisiana
1982	American Power Boat Association	Michelob Lite New Orleans	Lake Pontchartrain, New Orleans, Louisiana
1983	American Power Boat Association	Popeyes Offshore Grand Prix	Lake Pontchartrain, New Orleans, Louisiana
1984	American Power Boat Association	Popeyes Offshore Grand Prix	Lake Pontchartrain, New Orleans, Louisiana
1985	American Power Boat Association	Popeyes Offshore Grand Prix	Lake Pontchartrain, New Orleans, Louisiana
1986	American Power Boat Association	Popeyes Offshore Grand Prix	Lake Pontchartrain, New Orleans, Louisiana
1987	American Power Boat Association	Mississippi River Challenge	Mississippi River, New Orleans, Louisiana - St. Louis, Missouri
1987	American Power Boat Association	Popeyes Offshore Grand Prix	Lake Pontchartrain, New Orleans, Louisiana
1988	American Power Boat Association	Popeyes Offshore Grand Prix	Lake Pontchartrain, New Orleans, Louisiana
1989	American Power Boat Association	Popeyes Offshore Grand Prix	Lake Pontchartrain, New Orleans, Louisiana
1990	Offshore Professional Tour	Popeyes Offshore Grand Prix	Lake Pontchartrain, New Orleans, Louisiana
1991	Offshore Professional Tour	Popeyes Offshore Grand Prix	Lake Pontchartrain, New Orleans, Louisiana
2002	Super Boat International		Lake Pontchartrain, New Orleans, Louisiana
2003	Super Boat International		Lake Pontchartrain, New Orleans, Louisiana
2008	Offshore Super Series	Al Copeland Memorial Races	Lake Pontchartrain, New Orleans, Louisiana

== See also ==
- Offshore powerboat racing
