= Goujon =

Goujon may refer to:

- Goujon (automobile), a French automobile, 1896–1901
- Goujon (food), a small deep-fried strip of fish or meat

== People with the surname ==
- Jean Goujon (c. 1510 – c. 1565), French Renaissance sculptor
- Jean Goujon (cyclist) (1914–1991), French cyclist
- Jean-Marie Claude Alexandre Goujon (1766–1795), politician of the French Revolution
- Philippe Goujon (born 1954), French politician
