= Raising Cane's Chicken Fingers =

American restaurant chain

Raising Cane's Restaurants, LLC.

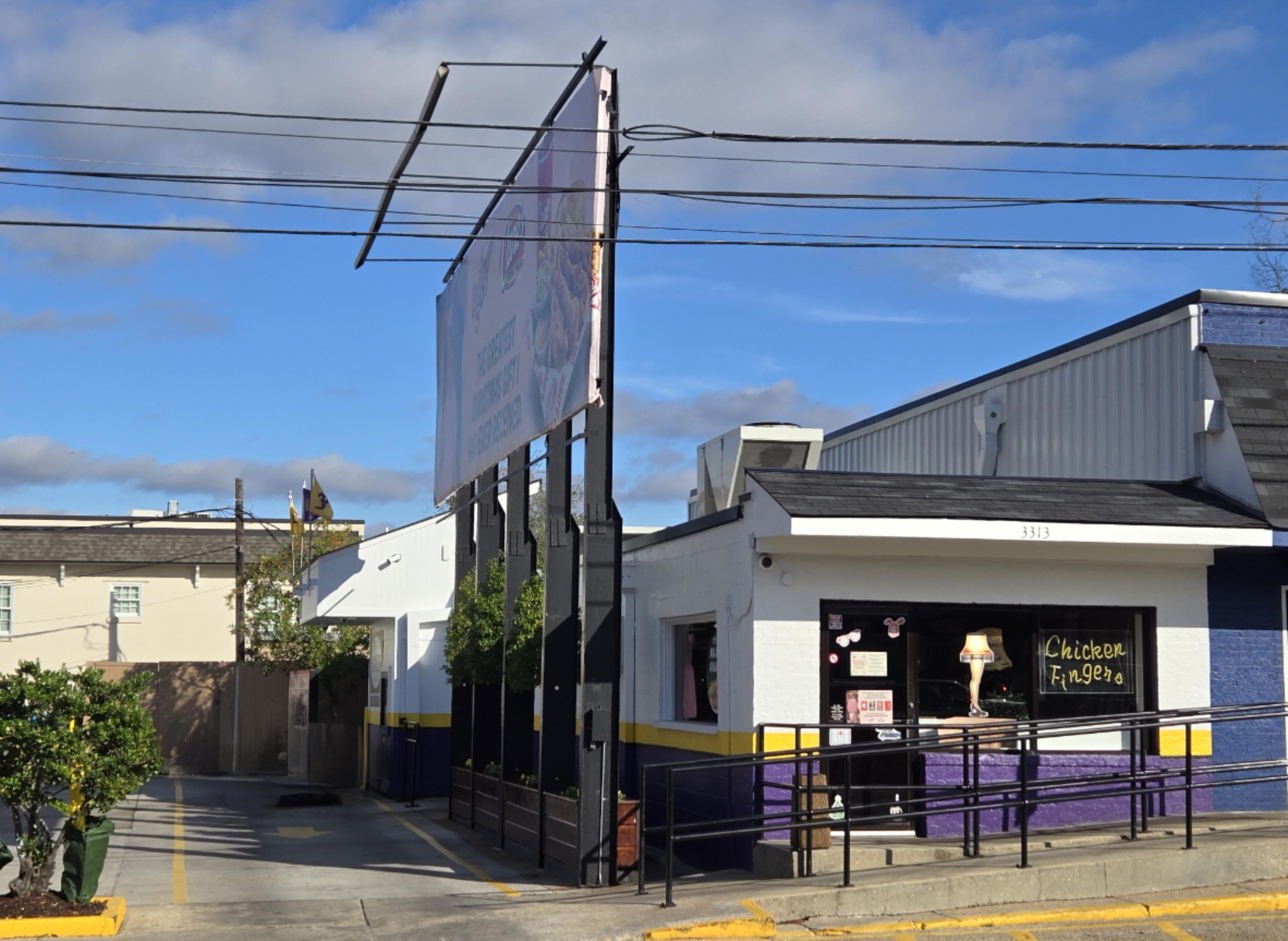
- The Mothership, Original Raising Cane's Restaurant in Baton Rouge, Louisiana
- Trade name: Raising Cane's Chicken Fingers
- Type: Private
- Industry: Restaurants
- Founded: August 28, 1996; 30 years ago
- Founder: Todd Graves, Craig Silvey
- Headquarters: Baton Rouge, Louisiana, U.S.
- Number of locations: 900+ (2025)
- Area served: United States; Bahrain; Kuwait; Qatar; Saudi Arabia; United Arab Emirates
- Key people: Todd Graves (co-CEO); AJ Kumaran (co-CEO)
- Products: Chicken fingers • French fries • Coleslaw • Cane's Sauce • Texas toast • Soft drinks
- Revenue: ▲US$5.1 billion
- Number of employees: Over 65,000 (2025)
- Website: www.raisingcanes.com

Raising Cane's Restaurants, LLC, doing business as Raising Cane's Chicken Fingers (commonly referred to as Raising Cane's or Cane's), is an American fast-food chain specializing in chicken fingers.

As of 2025, Raising Cane's is ranked third in annual sales for quick-serve chicken chains, behind Chick-fil-A and Popeyes.

== History ==
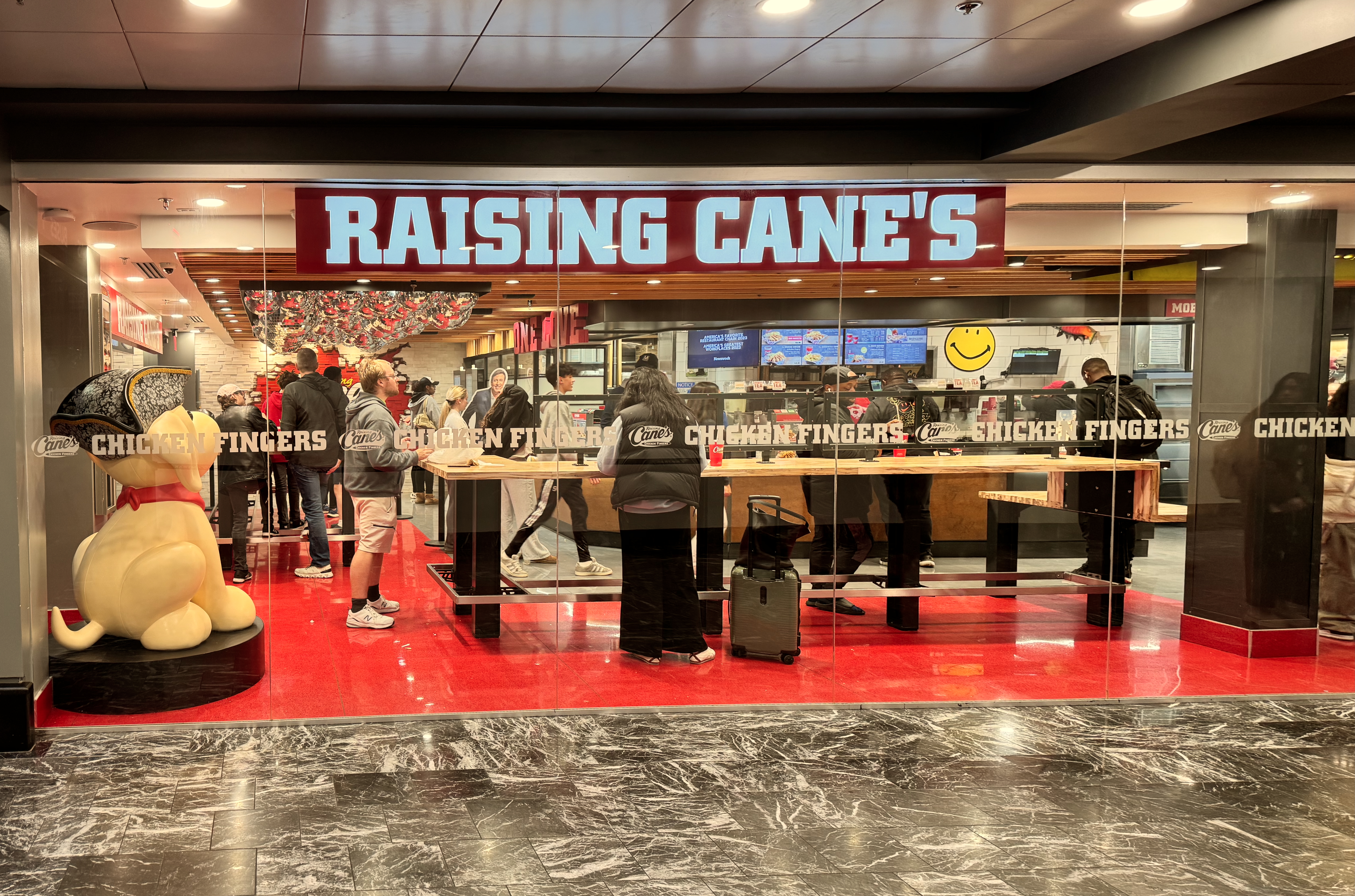
Raising Cane's at Washington Union Station

=== Founding ===
Founded by Todd Graves and Craig Silvey, the original restaurant, nicknamed "The Mothership", opened on August 28, 1996. It is located in Baton Rouge, Louisiana near the North Gate of Louisiana State University (LSU). The company is named after Graves's dog, a yellow Labrador. Other yellow Labradors have served as company mascots, as well as certified therapy animals.

Graves and Silvey were studying at different universities when they wrote a business plan for a chicken-finger restaurant which Silvey submitted in a business plan-writing course, receiving a B-minus grade from the professor. At the time, Graves worked at Guthrie's Chicken Fingers.

The business plan was rejected numerous times by potential investors, so Graves and Silvey earned the needed money working various manual labor jobs. They obtained an SBA loan, which they used to open their first restaurant, located in Baton Rouge at the intersection of Highland Road and State Street near the LSU campus. Silvey sold his share of the partnership shortly after the second restaurant opened.

=== Leadership ===
Graves was the sole CEO of Raising Cane's after Silvey sold his share of the partnership. In 2014, AJ Kumaran, a seasoned restaurant executive, joined Cane's as its chief operating officer. Three years later, Kumaran joined Graves as co-CEO.

=== Branding ===
In 1996, while renovating the first Raising Cane’s location near LSU, Graves uncovered an old mural from a former bakery, "Wolf's Bakery", that inspired the restaurant's logo with its red-brick tones, flowing white script, and a yellow tagline declaring "bread at its best". The name "Raising Cane's" pays tribute to his yellow Labrador, Cane. Locations feature custom murals.

These brand elements can be seen in official merchandise released by Raising Cane's. In addition, Raising Cane's sells limited-edition merchandise, like the Graduation Plush Puppy released in 2025. They held a fashion show in 2025 at New York Fashion Week, designed by Joe Ando-Hirsh.

=== Expansion ===
In March 2020, many of the Cane's locations switched from dine-in to pick-up and take-out service only due to the COVID-19 pandemic, whereas others closed temporarily. As of July 2020, certain locations had reopened their dining rooms, although Graves said the company was in no rush to do so on a full scale.

In 2021, in response to a shortage of workers at the time, the company began dispatching hundreds of its corporate employees to work in its restaurants as cooks and cashiers, in addition to their existing duties regarding the hiring of new employees. The company planned to hire 10,000 new employees. The company's co-CEO said that the corporate employees are trained in the kitchen and on the register under normal circumstances.

In 2022, Raising Cane's sued a shopping center in Hobart, Indiana. After the restaurant chain had signed a long-term lease, it was revealed that the shopping center had a non-compete agreement with McDonald's which prohibited other vendors from selling de-boned chicken products in the complex.

On June 27, 2023, Raising Cane's opened up their first New York location in Times Square.

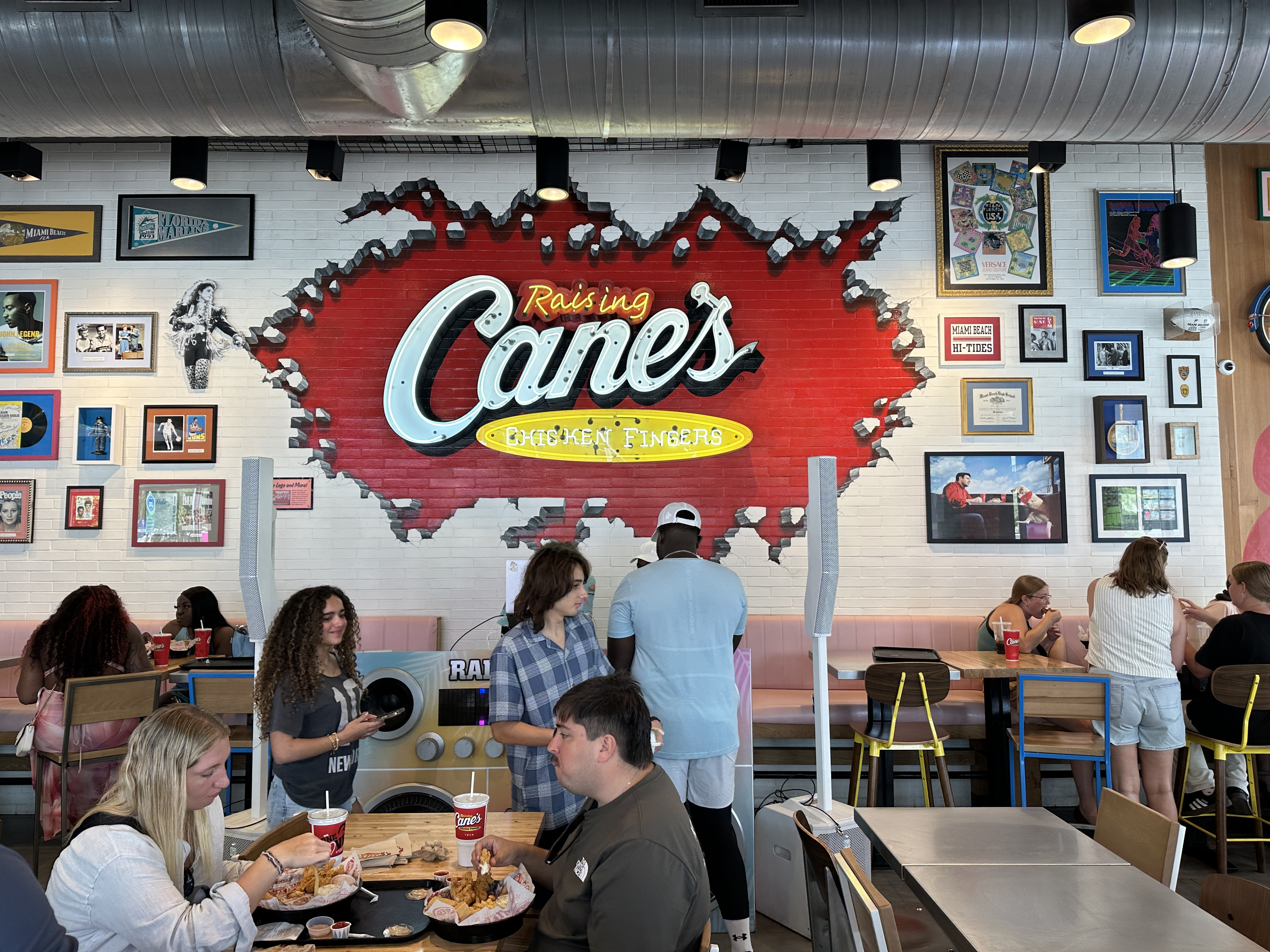
Raising Cane's mural in South Beach, Miami Beach

== Products ==
A combo meal of chicken fingers and a toast

=== Chicken fingers ===
The fried chicken is marinated and battered. A large number of people have tried to simulate the recipe for the chicken fingers.

=== Cane's Sauce ===
The recipe for the dipping sauce is kept private by company leadership. It likely contains mayonnaise, ketchup, Worcestershire sauce, black pepper, salt, and garlic powder.

=== Combos ===
Combos offered by Raising Cane's feature their chicken fingers and signature dipping sauce. Depending on the combo, they will also come with other sides such as crinkle-cut fries, coleslaw, and Texas toast.

== International expansion ==
The chain first began expanding internationally in 2014, opening its first restaurant in Kuwait. The namesake mascot, a dog, is not seen on signage and merchandise, as dogs are not popular in Kuwait for religious reasons. The restaurant chain expanded to Dubai in 2024. In 2025, it was reported the company is planning to open stores in Mexico in 2026 with an agreement with Mexico's Alsea.

== Gallery ==
=== The Mothership – Original Raising Cane's Restaurant Gallery ===
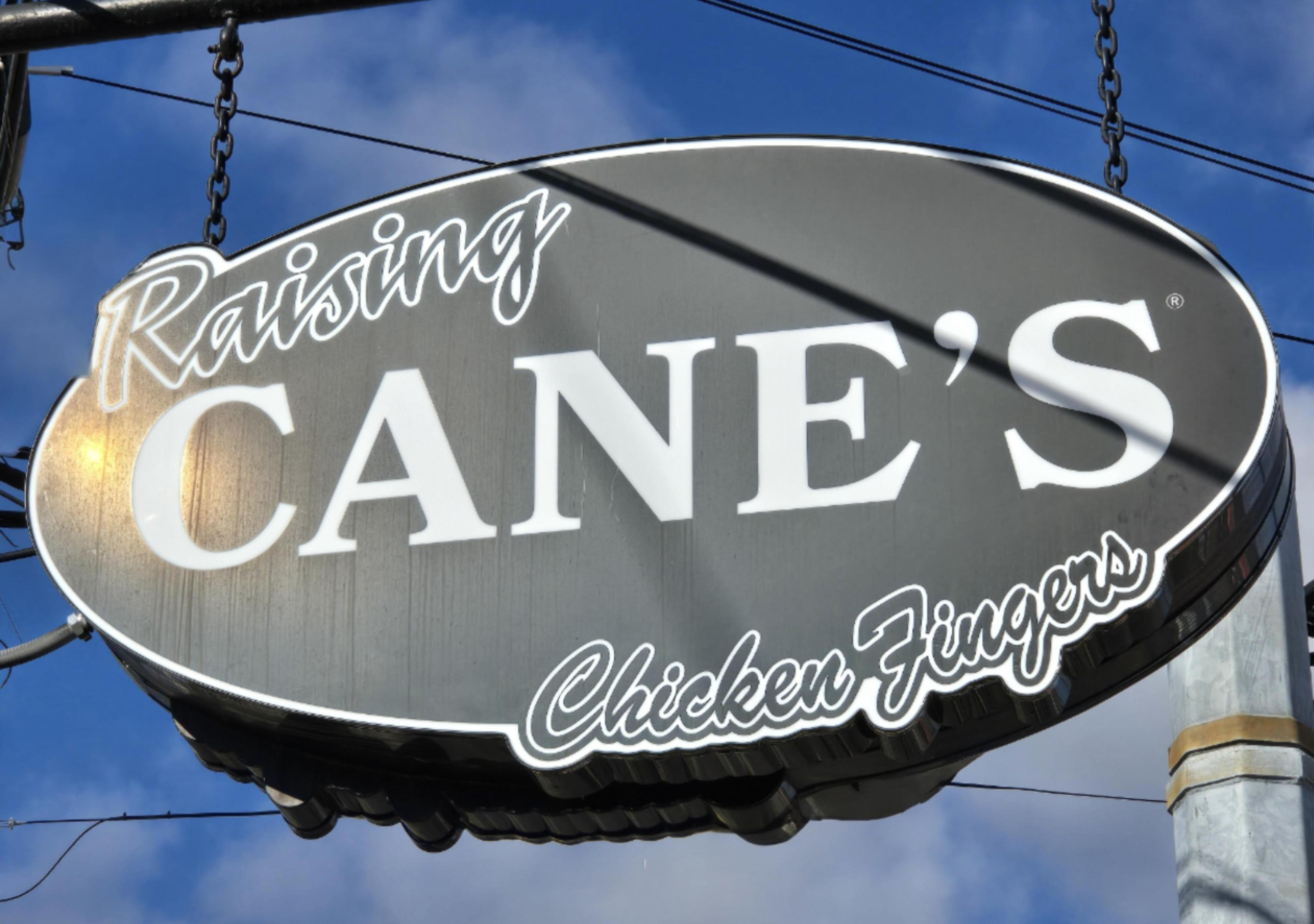
The Mothership, Original Raising Cane's Restaurant Sign

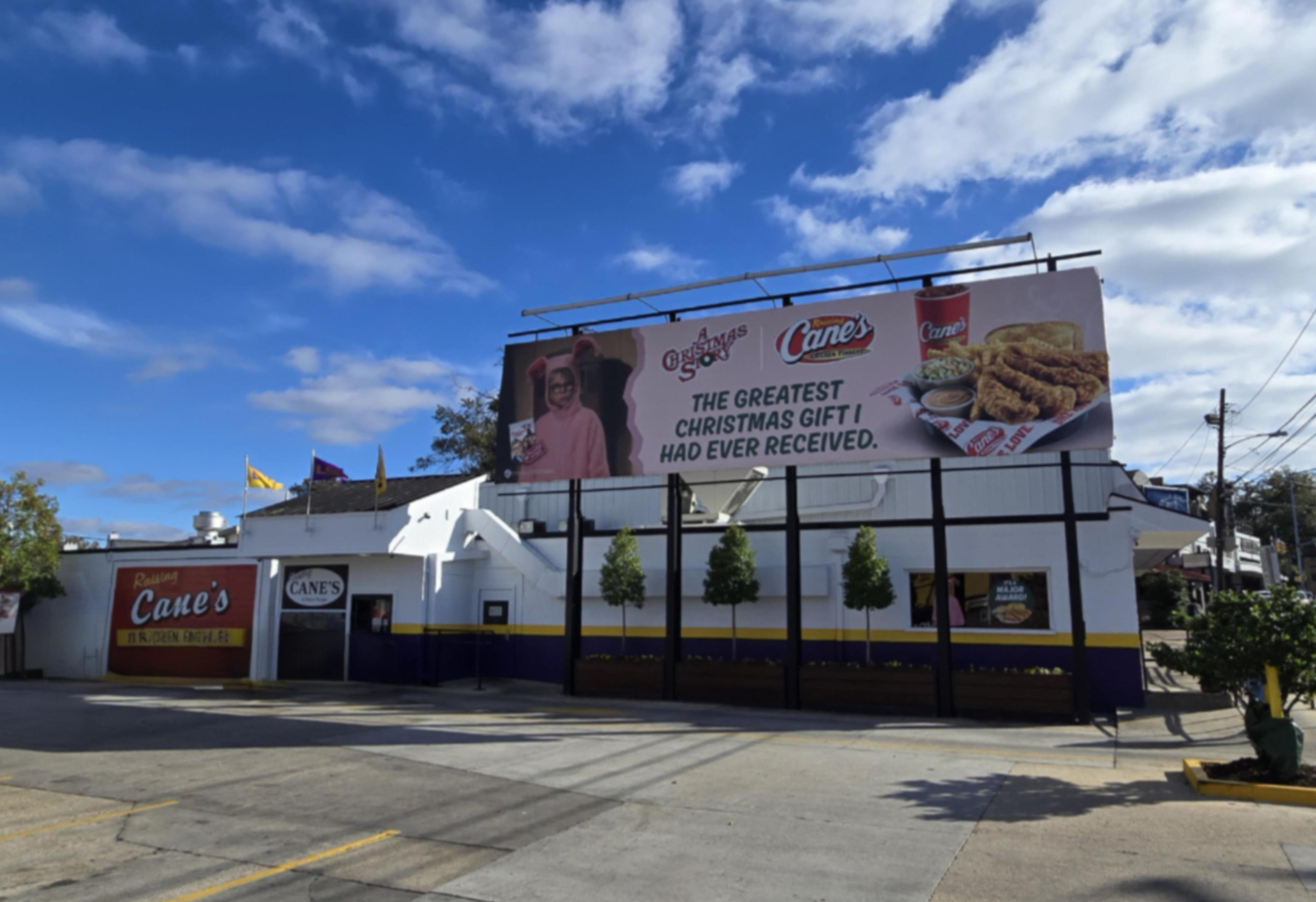
The Mothership, Original Raising Cane's Restaurant and Drive-thru

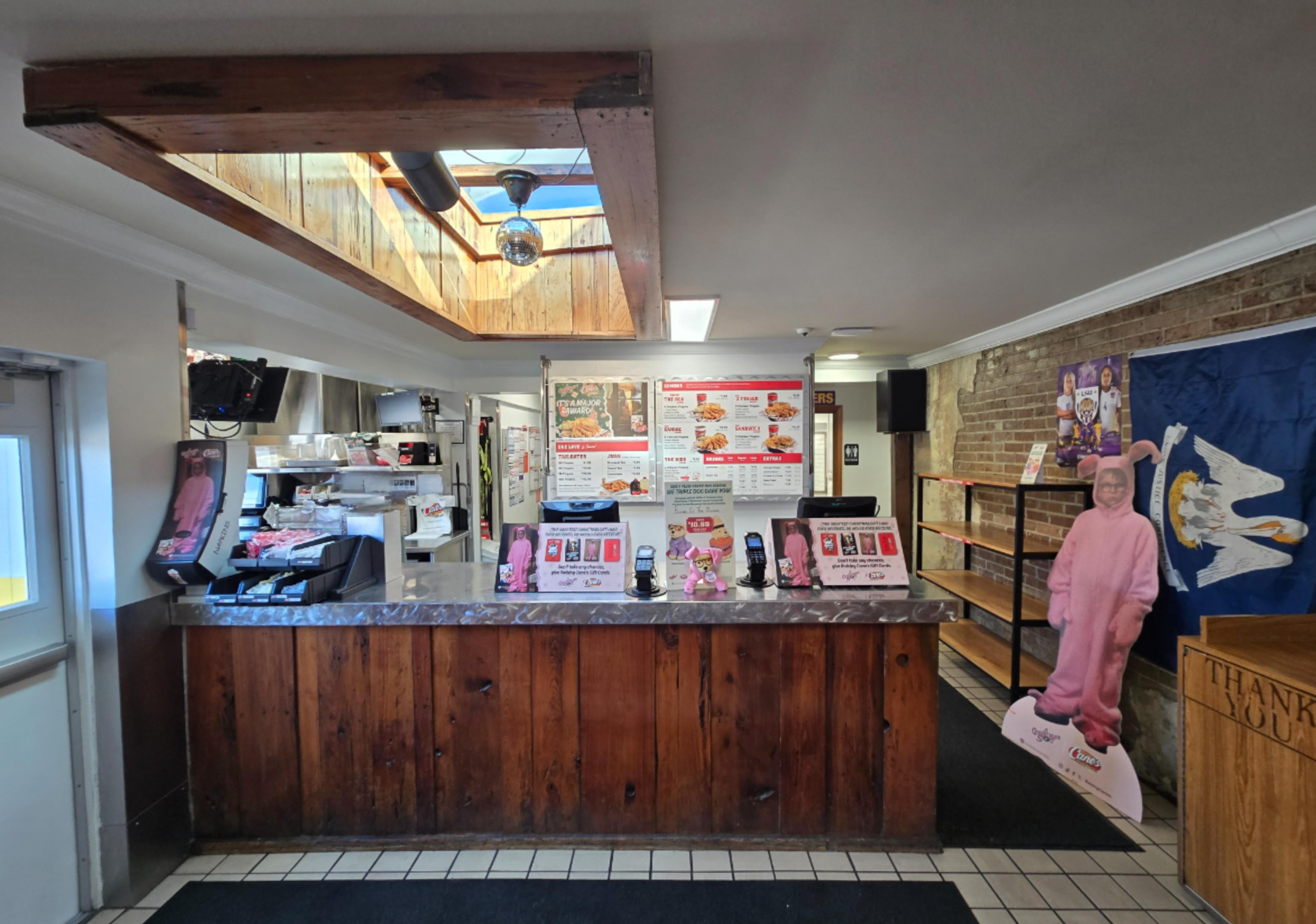
The Mothership, Original Raising Cane's Restaurant Counter

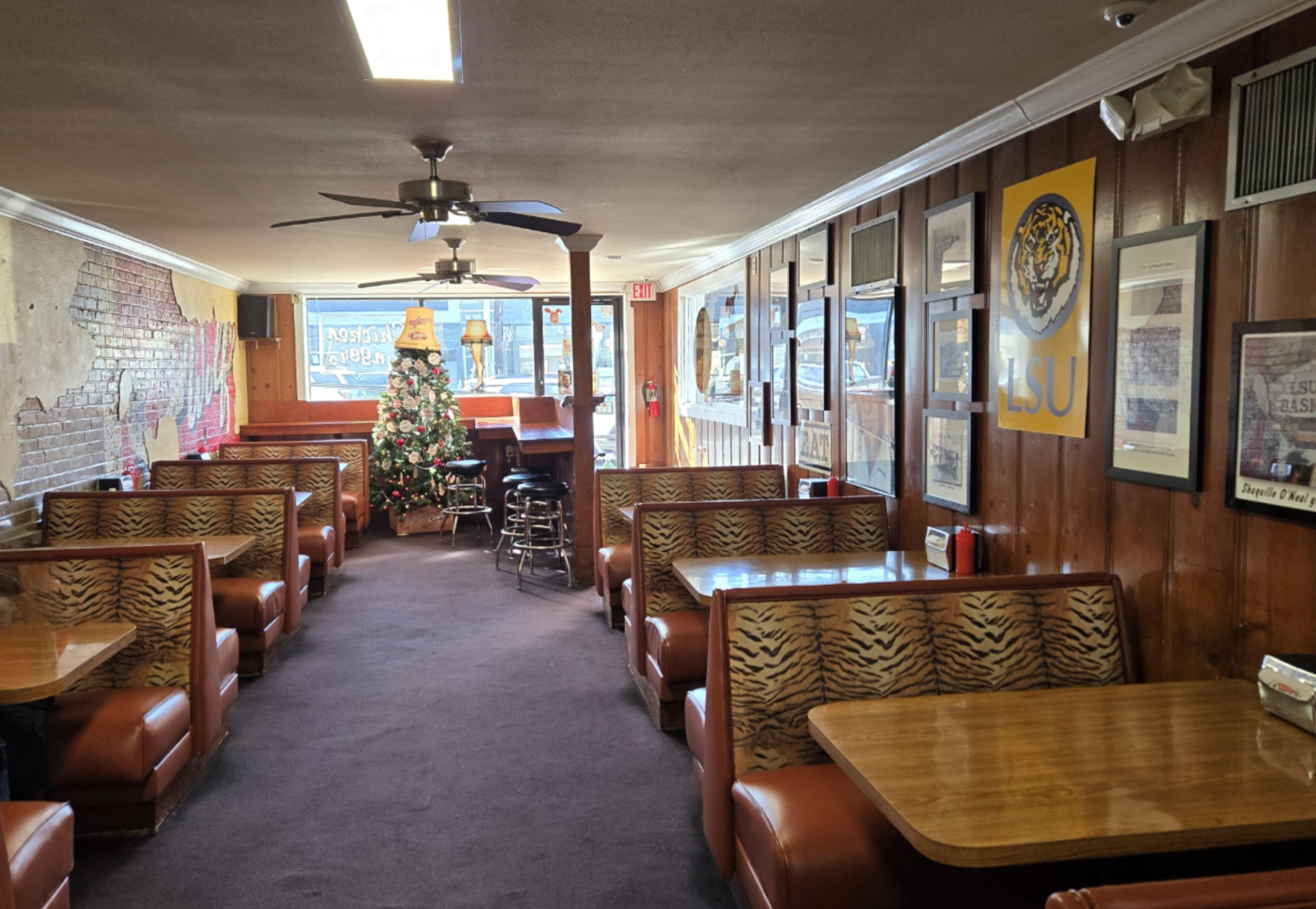
The Mothership, Original Raising Cane's Restaurant Interior

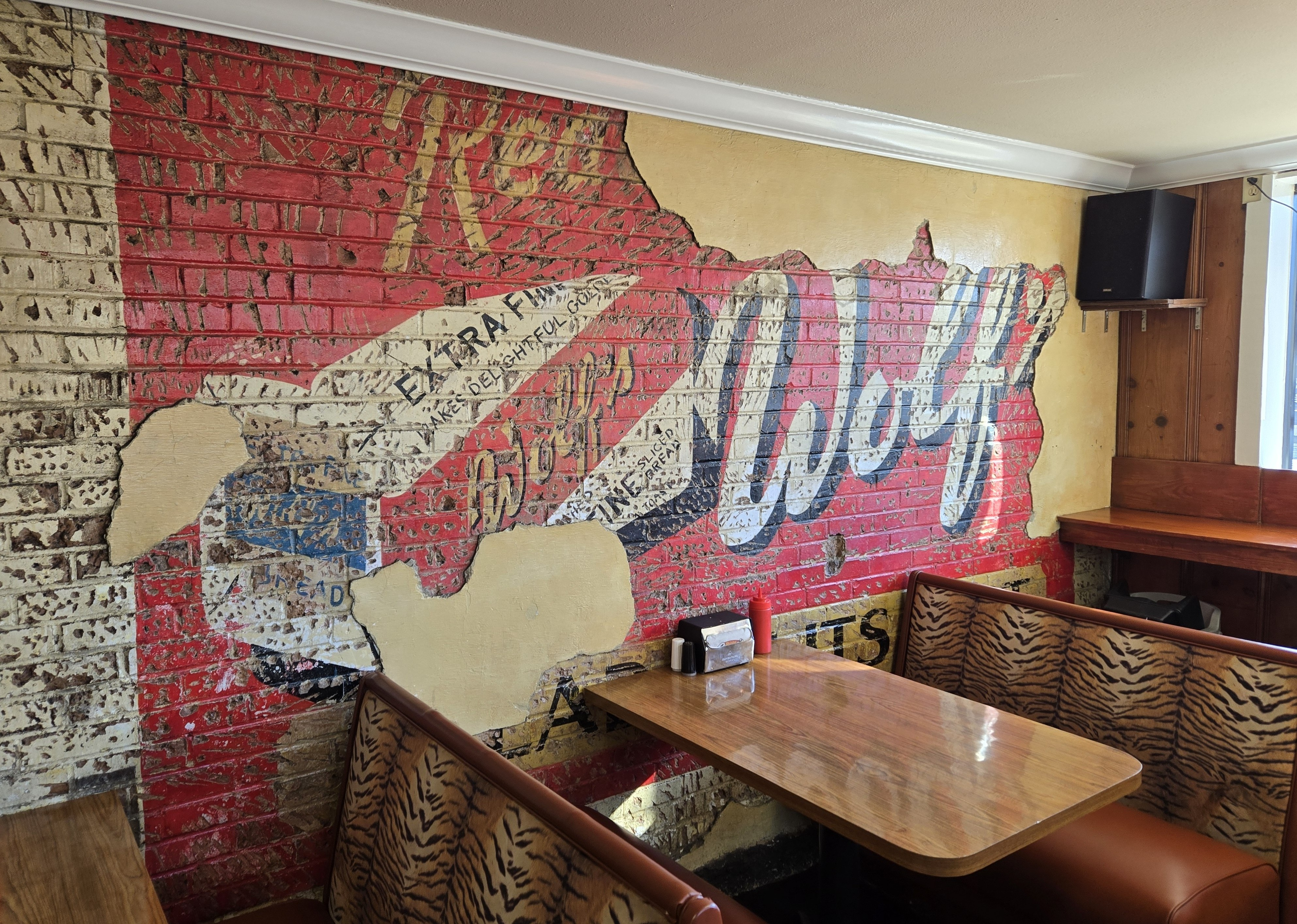
The Mothership, Original Raising Cane's Restaurant – Wolf's Bakery Mural
