= Todd Graves =

Todd Graves may refer to:

- Todd Graves (attorney), American attorney
- Todd Graves (entrepreneur) (born 1972), American entrepreneur
- James "Todd" Graves (born 1963), American sport shooter
