= Wow Cafe and Wingery =

Restaurant in Covington, Louisiana, U.S.

Coordinates: 29.9373°N 89.9475°W

WOW American Eats (formerly known as WOW Cafe American Grill & Wingery) is a restaurant founded in 2001 by Paul, Scott, and Steve Ballard in Covington, Louisiana. Since opening its first restaurant, the franchise has expanded and opened locations all over the United States, including more than 50 in 2008. Many of these locations can be found on college campuses or in government facilities. The headquarters are located in Covington. The name is an abbreviation of "World of Wings".

== Menu ==
The restaurant menu includes appetizers, quesadillas, fajitas, chicken wings, chicken tenders, hamburgers, wraps, salads, New Orleans entrees, desserts, and a children's menu. The wings come with a choice of 17 sauces, including Buffalo, Thai, Kansas City BBQ, Asian Teriyaki, Jamaican Jerk, Santa Fe and Acadian. It also features a selection of signature drinks unique to the franchise.
