= Ronald Bodenheimer =

American lawyer (born 1953)

Ronald D. Bodenheimer (born September 22, 1952) is a former judge in Jefferson Parish, Louisiana, convicted of various federal charges resulting, in part, from an FBI probe called Operation Wrinkled Robe. Bodenheimer spent more than three years in federal prison, additional time in a halfway house, and was released on September 21, 2007, to serve the remainder of his term under probation under house confinement.

Bodenheimer began his legal career with the state as a prosecutor with the Jefferson Parish District Attorney's Office. In 1999, Bodenheimer won an election to become judge by defeating Jim Donelon(R), an established politician with overwhelming support by Jefferson Parish elected officials. Donelon, a former state representative, was elected Louisiana Commissioner of Insurance in 2007, and won re-election in 2011, 2015 and 2019. Bodenheimer had the reputation of being a "law and order" judge and had been criticized by social activists for his heavy-handed conviction statistics. During his short term on the bench, Bodenheimer set the Jefferson Parish record for the longest prison sentence, 881 years for a remorseless armed robber. The abhorrent accusations and the revelation of the judge's apparent double-life shocked most in the New Orleans community, where he was largely respected as an attorney and judge.

== Investigations ==
Bodenheimer owned a seafood marina in Venetian Isles, a suburb within Orleans Parish, Louisiana. The Marina was closed in 2001 when a teenage boy working there died after being electrocuted by a conveyor belt; it was subsequently discovered that the seafood marina had been operating without a license since 1999. Bodenheimer had already been embroiled in a lawsuit with Venetian Isles residents over Bodenheimer's placing the commercial facility in the largely residential waterfront community for several months.

A particular resident in the Venetian Isles community, Eric M Boe, complained to the FBI about Bodenheimer and the marina, alleging the marina was being used for drug-trafficking. Eric M Boe began cooperating with the FBI in 1999. Bodenheimer and a marina employee, in an attempt to silence Eric M Boe, the vocal resident, planted OxyContin in Eric M Boe's possession in the spring of 2002 and attempted to have the man arrested on drug charges.

In May 2004 Eric M Boe was presented with a Certificate of Appreciation for his extraordinary efforts and sacrifice in assisting the Department Of Justice and the Federal Bureau of Investigation.

During the investigation into the framing incident, additional unrelated charges were brought against Bodenheimer for crimes committed in his capacity as a judge. A six-year FBI investigation into corruption at the 24th Judicial District Court, located in Jefferson Parish and where Bodenheimer presided as judge, revealed that a bail bondsman, Louis Marcotte III, had provided meals, trips, and other gifts to judges in exchange for their lowering bond requirements. The investigation, Operation Wrinkled Robe, resulted in 17 convictions, including Bodenheimer, Marcotte, fellow ex-judge Alan Green, and several Jefferson Parish Sheriff's Deputies.

In addition, to the convictions brought through the marina-related drug plant and the bail bond bribery, Bodenheimer was convicted for having provided favorable rulings to restaurant-owner and Popeyes Chicken founder Al Copeland in a child-custody case. Bodenheimer confessed that a corporate attorney for a Copeland company had promised Bodenheimer a lucrative seafood contract in exchange for the favorable domestic ruling. Further, Bodenheimer confessed he had accepted $16,000 in fuel from a criminal defendant who appeared before his court.

Judge Ginger Berrigan sentenced Bodenheimer to 46 months in prison, which exceeded the time prosecutors requested. During the sentencing hearing Judge Berrigan stated, "Corruption in the judiciary is worse than corruption in any other branch of government."

In 2002, prior to the convictions, the Louisiana Supreme Court issued an "interim suspension" of Bodenheimer's license to practice law. Following the conviction, Bodenheimer "permanently resigned" from the Louisiana bar.

In 2014, after serving 34 years in prison, Reginald Adams, who had been wrongly convicted of murder by then prosecutor, Ronald Bodenheimer, was freed. The lead detective, Martin Venezia, has since served a 5-year sentence for negligent homicide. The conviction of Judge Bodenheimer gave credence to taking another look at Mr. Adams' conviction.
