= Blake Miller (center) =

American football player (born 1968)

No. 62
- Position: Center

Personal information
- Born: August 23, 1968 (age 58); Alexandria, Louisiana, U.S.
- Listed height: 6 ft 1 in (1.85 m)
- Listed weight: 282 lb (128 kg)

Career information
- High school: Alexandria (LA)
- College: LSU (1986–1990)
- NFL draft: 1991: 7th round, 168th overall pick

Career history

Playing
- New England Patriots (1991)*; Detroit Lions (1992); New York Giants (1993)*
- * Offseason or practice squad member only

Coaching
- Episcopal School of Baton Rouge (1994–?) Assistant coach; Kilgore High School (?–1996) Assistant coach; Northwestern State (1997–1999) Offensive line coach; Southwest Texas State (2000) Offensive line coach; Southwest Texas State (2001–2002) Offensive coordinator / offensive line coach; SMU (2003) Offensive line coach; Texas State (2004–2006) Co-offensive coordinator / offensive line coach; Rice (2007–2008) Offensive line coach / run game coordinator; Utah (2009–2010) Offensive line coach; Memphis (2011) Offensive line coach

Awards and highlights
- Second-team All-SEC (1990)

Career NFL statistics
- Games played: 14
- Games started: 5
- Stats at Pro Football Reference

Blake Randolph Miller (born August 23, 1968) is an American former professional football player and coach. He was a center for one season in the National Football League (NFL) for the Detroit Lions. He played college football for the LSU Tigers and also had stints with the New England Patriots and New York Giants.

== Early life ==
Miller was born on August 23, 1968, in Alexandria, Louisiana. He attended Alexandria Senior High School, where he won two varsity letters and was a starting offensive tackle and long snapper. As a senior, he was named first-team Class AAAA All-State. He was named one of the top 24 recruits in the state by the Baton Rouge Morning Advocate and committed to play college football for the LSU Tigers over a number of other offers.

== College career ==
Miller noted that he arrived at LSU in poor shape and "didn't know what hard work was." He initially performed poorly in school and had difficulty listening to the coaches. However, he then was told by coach Pete Mangurian that "You're never going to play if you don't learn how to work," and Miller became motivated to improve, starting a "turnaround" with him improving his grades and getting in better shape. Considered small for tackle at 6 feet 2 inches (1.88 m) and 250 pounds (110 kg), he moved to guard and also practiced at center as a freshman in 1986. He redshirted that year.

In spring practice prior to the 1987 season, Miller began as the first-team center due to injuries to several others at the position. He ultimately returned to guard before the season began and played in 10 games as a backup, also serving as backup center but not seeing any action in that role. He helped them reach the 1987 Gator Bowl, where the Tigers defeated the South Carolina Gamecocks.

Miller moved permanently to center prior to the 1988 season and became a backup to Todd Coutee. He ultimately played in seven games that season, which included a start against the Florida Gators when Coutee was injured. After Coutee graduated in 1989, Miller became LSU's full-time starter at center. He started all but one of the team's games and helped them reach a bowl game. He entered the 1990 season as the team's only returning starter from the 1986 class. He started all 11 games in the 1990 season and blocked for future first-round NFL draft pick Harvey Williams, earning All-Southeastern Conference (SEC) honors from the league's coaches and second-team honors from the Associated Press (AP). He was invited to the Blue–Gray Football Classic, the East–West Shrine Bowl, and the NFL Scouting Combine. He graduated from LSU with a bachelor's degree in general studies and ended his college football career having been twice named the Tigers' offensive lineman of the year.

== Professional career ==
Pre-draft measurables
Height	Weight	Arm length	Hand span	40-yard dash	10-yard split	20-yard split	20-yard shuttle	Vertical jump	Broad jump	Bench press
6 ft 1 3/8 in (1.86 m)	281 lb (127 kg)	32 in (0.81 m)	10 1/4 in (0.26 m)	5.14 s	1.79 s	2.96 s	4.55 s	28.5 in (0.72 m)	9 ft 1 in (2.77 m)	21 reps

Miller was selected in the seventh round (168th overall) of the 1991 NFL draft by the New England Patriots. He was released as part of the team's final roster cuts. He was re-signed to the team on their practice squad shortly after. He appeared in no games for the team and became a free agent after the season.

Miller was signed by the Detroit Lions in April 1992. He started in preseason and ultimately made the final roster. Initially a backup, he saw action as a starter following an injury to Kevin Glover. His season ended in mid-December when he was placed on injured reserve as a result of a sprained ankle. He appeared in a total of 14 games, five as a starter, during the 1992 season for the Lions. He was waived by the Lions in early May 1993 and was then claimed by the New York Giants, although they later released him in August 1993, ending his playing career.

== Coaching career ==
Miller began coaching after his playing career, assisting at the Episcopal School of Baton Rouge and Kilgore High School between 1994 and 1996. He then joined the Northwestern State Demons and was their offensive line coach from 1997 to 1999, helping them win two conference championships. He then joined the Southwest Texas State Bobcats as offensive line coach in 2000 and rose to offensive coordinator in 2001. He joined the SMU Mustangs as offensive line coach in 2003 before returning to the Bobcats in 2004, serving the next three seasons as offensive line coach and co-offensive coordinator. He left for the Rice Owls in 2007 and served two seasons as run game coordinator and offensive line coach, helping them win 10 games with a 2008 Texas Bowl win in his second year. Miller became the offensive line coach for the Utah Utes in 2009 and, after two seasons there, left for the same role with the Memphis Tigers in 2011. He was not retained after his first season at Memphis.
