= Aladdin Bail Bonds =

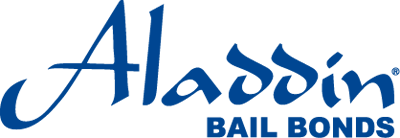
- Industry: Bail bonds
- Headquarters: Carlsbad, California, United States
- Area served: California, Idaho, Nevada, Utah, Texas, Washington, South Carolina, Ohio
- Parent: Endeavour Capital Fund VI
- Website: www.aladdinbailbonds.com

Aladdin Bail Bonds is a chain of bail bond agents based in Carlsbad, California, United States, and owned by Endeavour Capital Fund VI. With more than 50 offices in eight states, it is one of the largest bail bond companies in the United States and the largest in California.

== See also ==
- Bail in the United States
