= Chicken tenders =

U.S. dish of breaded and fried chicken meat

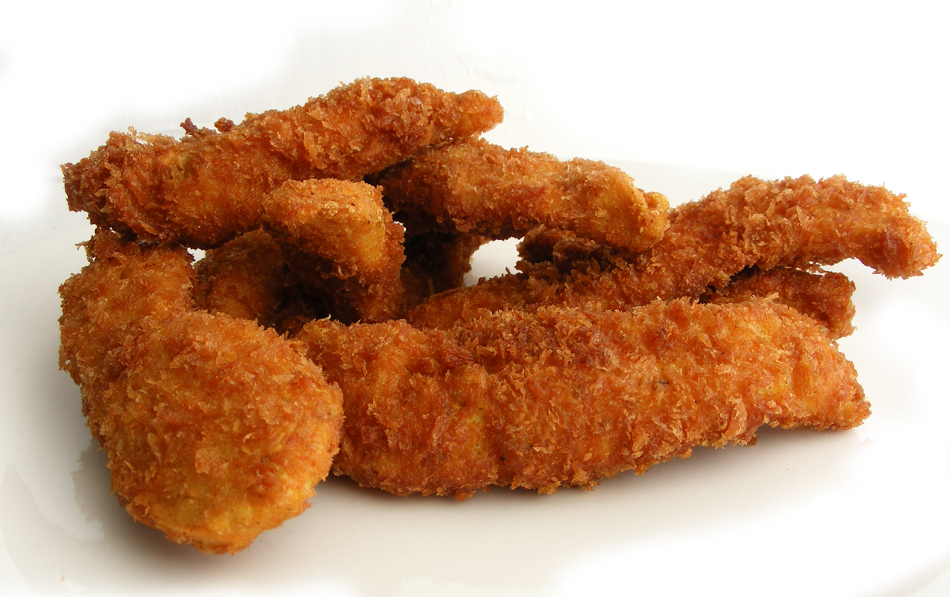
- Alternative names: Chicken fingers, chicken fillets, chicken goujons, chicken strips
- Course: Appetizer, main course
- Place of origin: Manchester, New Hampshire, United States
- Serving temperature: Hot
- Main ingredients: Chicken, breading

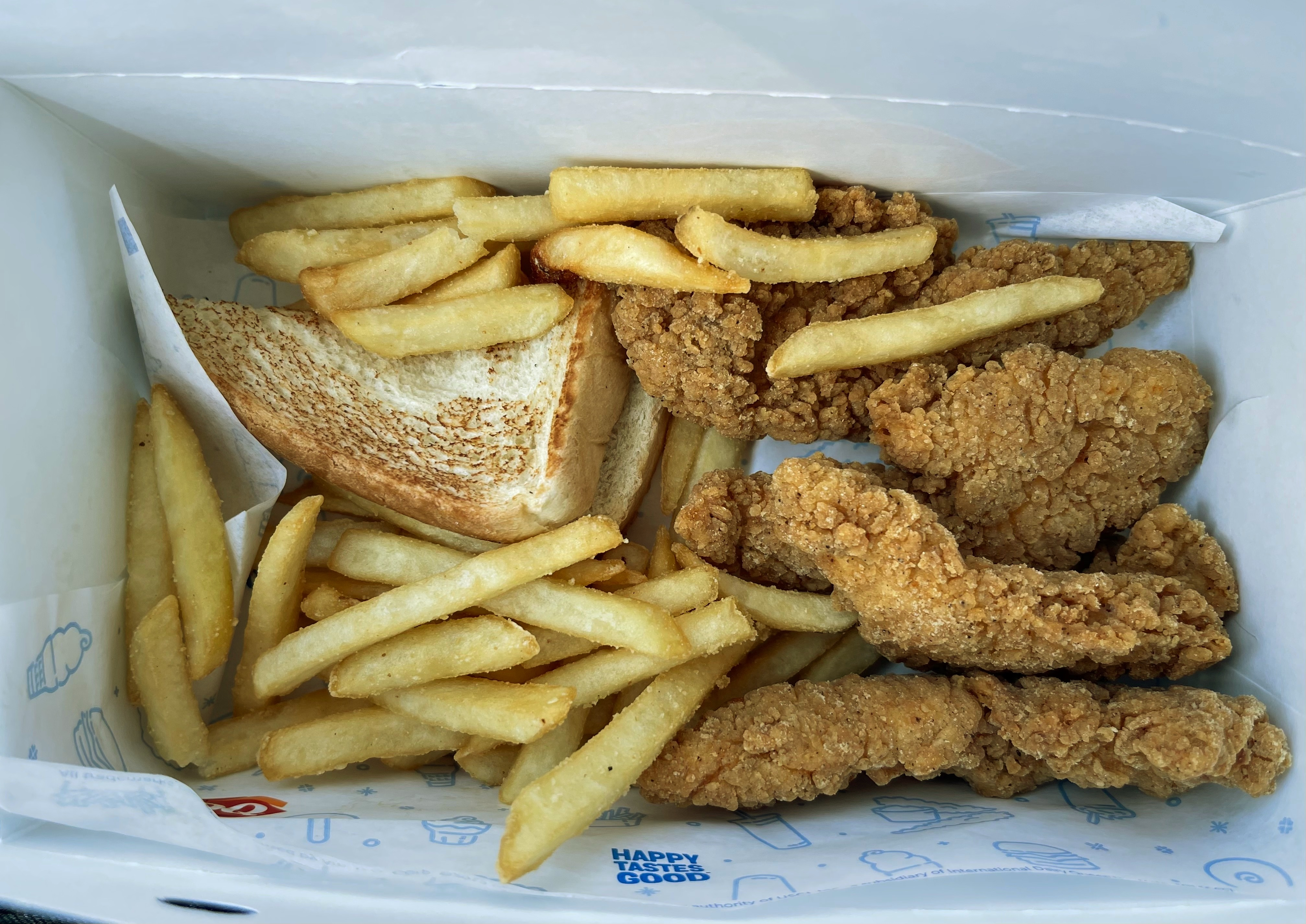
Chicken fingers from Dairy Queen, usually served with french fries and sauce of choice

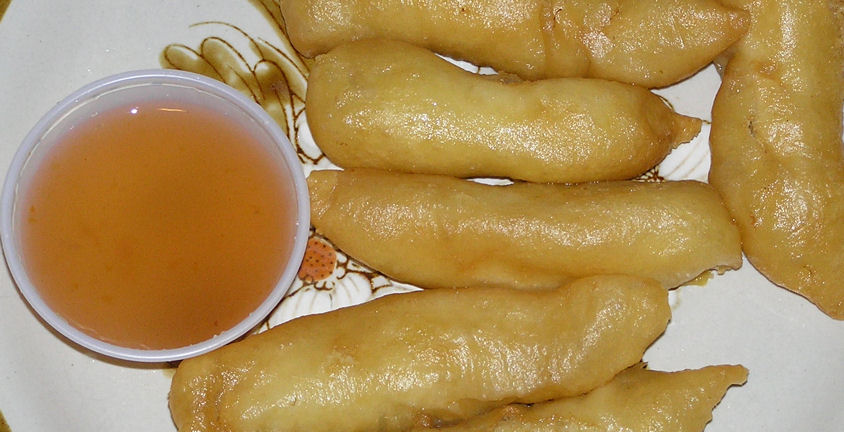
Batter-coated deep-fried golden fingers with a dipping sauce, served in an American Chinese restaurant

Chicken tenders (also known as chicken goujons, chicken strips, chicken fingers, or chicken fillets) are chicken meat prepared from the pectoralis minor muscles of the bird. These strips of white meat are located on either side of the breastbone, under the breast meat (pectoralis major). They may also be made with similarly shaped pieces cut from chicken meat, usually the breast, or sometimes just pulverized chicken flesh.

Chicken tenders are prepared by coating chicken meat in a breading mixture and then deep frying them, in a manner similar to the preparation of Italian style milanese or schnitzel. They are a very popular fast-food snack or main course due to their convenience and have become a staple across the United States. Some of the most popular fast-food restaurants that sell chicken tenders include Guthrie's, Raising Cane's Chicken Fingers, Chick-fil-A, Church's Chicken, KFC, Popeyes, Zaxby's and Culver's.

== History ==
Chicken tenders were first made at the Puritan Backroom in Manchester, New Hampshire, in 1974. Charlie Pappas salvaged chicken pieces that had been trimmed from larger cuts of chicken, marinating and frying them to create chicken tenders.

Other restaurants in Savannah, Georgia, and Baton Rouge, Louisiana, have challenged this claim with later assertions to the invention of chicken tenders, although the consensus supports the claim in Manchester. In 2023, Manchester was officially declared the "Chicken Tender Capital of the World" by Mayor Joyce Craig.

== Mass production ==
Chicken tenders are a mass-produced product in the United States. They gained popularity in the mid-to-late 1980s as an alternative fast food choice to chicken nuggets, since they retained more chicken meat. Production can involve coating chicken meat with spices, polyphosphate and breading or crumbs, flash-frying the product to hold the breading in place, and then freezing it prior to shipment for consumer, retail and commercial use. Tyson Foods is one such company that mass-produces chicken fingers. Some are manufactured with a specific flavor profile, such as with a Buffalo-style hot sauce flavor. They are also manufactured with flavors such as Honey BBQ and Parmesan Herb Encrusted.

== Variants ==
Chicken tenders are sometimes grilled rather than fried; they may accompany salads or pasta.

The chicken tenders invented at the Puritan Backroom in 1974 were marinated in pineapple juice, and marinated "Manchester chicken tenders" can be found at other restaurants in the Manchester area.

== See also ==
- Chicken as food
- Chicken nuggets
- Fish fingers
- List of chicken dishes
- List of fried chicken dishes
- List of hors d'oeuvre

== Works cited ==
- Simon, Bryant (2020). The Hamlet Fire: A Tragic Story of Cheap Food, Cheap Government, and Cheap Lives. Chapel Hill: The University of North Carolina Press. ISBN 9781469661377.
- "FoodData Central Search Results". United States Department of Agriculture.
