= Todd Graves (entrepreneur) =

American businessman (born 1972)

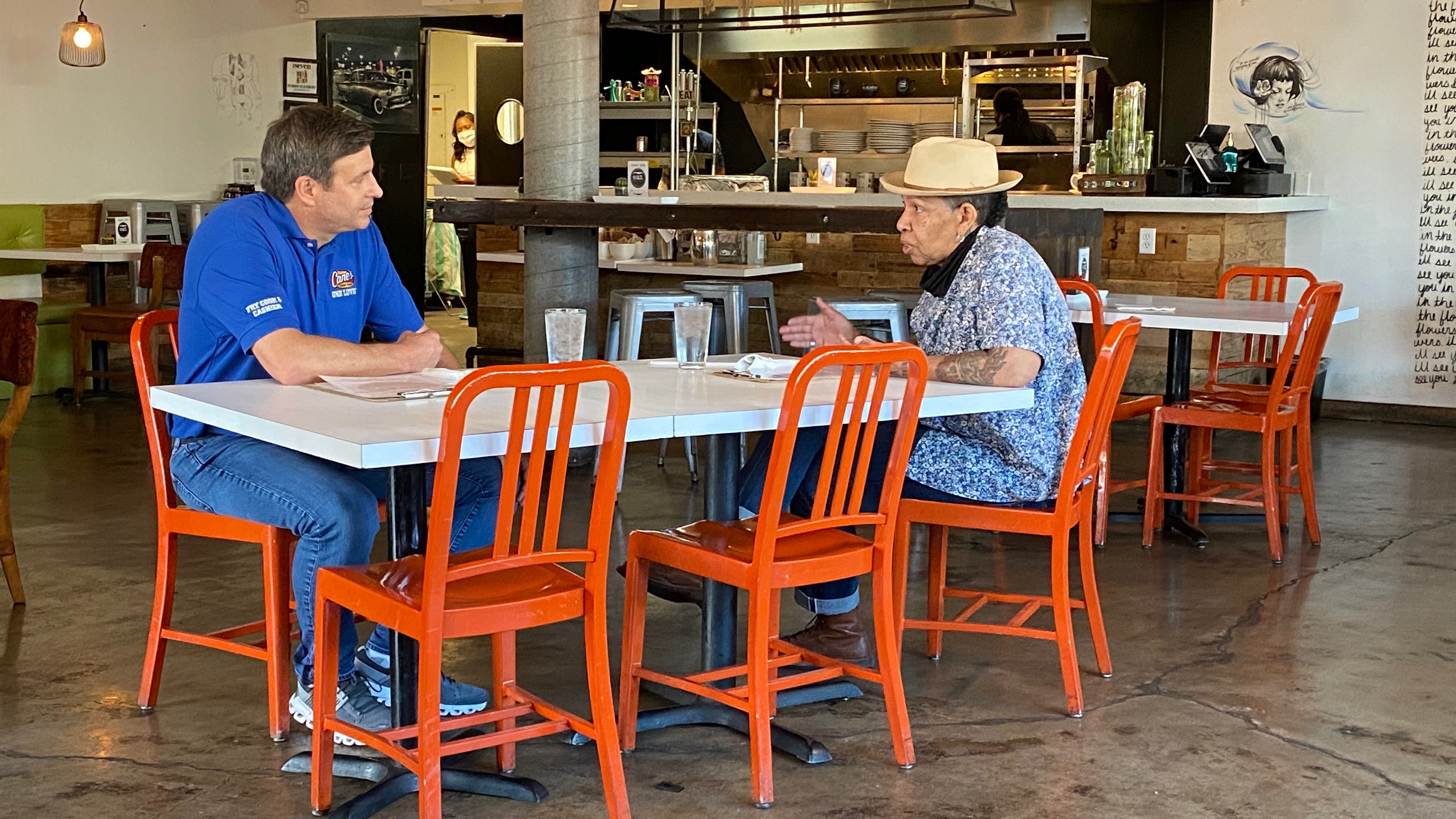
- Todd Graves (left) at Eat Las Vegas
- Born: Todd Bartlett Graves; 1972 (age 53–54); New Orleans, Louisiana, U.S.
- Education: University of Georgia (BA)
- Office: Co-founder and CEO of Raising Cane's Chicken Fingers
- Spouse: Gwen Drain
- Children: 2

Todd Bartlett Graves (born February 20, 1972) is an American businessman and co-founder of Raising Cane's Chicken Fingers, a fast food restaurant chain specializing in fried chicken finger meals.

== Early life ==
Graves was born in New Orleans and raised in Baton Rouge, Louisiana. He graduated from Episcopal School of Baton Rouge. Graves earned a bachelor's degree from the University of Georgia.

== Raising Cane's Chicken Fingers ==
In 1996, Graves opened Raising Cane's near the North Gates of Louisiana State University on Highland Road. Graves has attributed the company's business plan to the content of a course at LSU.

The restaurants are named after Raising Cane I, Graves' dog at the time of founding the first restaurant. The company is headquartered in Baton Rouge. As of 2025, the company operated nearly 1000 restaurants in the U.S.

Graves ranked in the 46th position on the 2025 Forbes 400 List of richest Americans. The next year, Forbes estimated Graves' net worth at $20 billion, making him the 137th wealthiest person in the world at the time.

== Personal life ==
In 2000, Graves married Gwen Drain, a former McDonald's franchisee, whom he had known since high school. They have two daughters and reside in Baton Rouge, Louisiana, with their yellow Labrador, Raising Cane III.

=== Collections ===
An avid collector, Graves has loaned a 66-million-year-old triceratops skull to the Louisiana Arts and Science Museum. He has also loaned the hearse that carried Martin Luther King Jr. to exhibits across the country.
