= Cheryl Bachelder =

American businesswoman (born 1956)

- Born: 1956 (age 69–70)
- Education: Indiana University Bloomington
- Occupation: Businesswoman
- Employer: Former CEO of Popeyes Louisiana Kitchen

Cheryl Bachelder (born 1956) is an American businesswoman who was previously Interim CEO of Pier 1 Imports as well as the former CEO of AFC Enterprises, the parent company of Popeyes Louisiana Kitchen, from 2007 to 2017. She was president of KFC from 2001 to 2003.

== Biography ==
Bachelder grew up in a Christian family. She received a bachelor of science (1977) and master of business administration (1978) from the Kelley School of Business at Indiana University Bloomington. From 1978 to 1992, Bachelder served in a number of brand management positions in the consumer products industry, at Procter & Gamble, Gillette and RJR Nabisco.

Bachelder returned to business in 1995, after being a full-time mother, working as senior vice president of marketing and product development for Domino's Pizza until 2000. In 2001, Bachelder left Domino's to join Yum! Brands as president of the international fried chicken restaurant chain KFC, formerly Kentucky Fried Chicken. Two years later, she was fired, based on what she herself describes as "'mediocre' performance".

In 2006, Bachelder joined the board of directors of AFC Enterprises, the owner of the restaurant chain that was then called Popeyes Chicken & Biscuits. The next year, the board elected her chief executive officer, a post she held until the chain's purchase in March 2017. At the time she was hired, Popeyes had shuffled through four CEOs in the previous seven years, and relationships with franchisees had become strained. Bachelder led Popeyes, which she rebranded as Popeyes Louisiana Kitchen, through ten straight years of growth, with top line restaurant sales rising by 45 percent and restaurant operating profit more than doubled. Popeyes' stock rose in value from $15 to $79 per share, alongside consistent increases in same-store restaurant sales, during her tenure.

Bachelder authored a book, Dare to Serve: How To Drive Superior Results While Serving Others, about servant leadership, the management philosophy she claimed to follow during her years in business. She identifies as a Christian and is pro-life.
