= Episcopal School of Baton Rouge =

Private school in Baton Rouge, Louisiana, United States

Location
- 3200 Woodland Ridge Blvd. Baton Rouge, LA 70816; Baton Rouge, East Baton Rouge Parish, Louisiana; United States; 30.4259°N 91.0337°W

Information
- Other name: EHS
- Type: Private (Day School)
- Motto: Via, Veritas, Vita (The way of truth and the life)
- Denomination: Episcopalian
- Established: 1965
- Dean: Scott Engholm
- Principal: Dan Binder (Upper School); Anne Dalton (Middle School); Beth Gardner (Lower School)
- Head of school: Carrie Steakley
- Grades: Pre-K – 12
- Enrollment: 950 (about 400 in Upper School)
- Student to teacher ratio: 10:1
- Campus size: 50-acre (200,000 m^{2})
- Campus type: Suburban
- Colors: Navy and Athletic gold
- Athletics: Louisiana High School Athletic Association
- Athletics conference: District 8-2A
- Sports: Cross Country, Baseball, Basketball, Football, Golf, Powerlifting, Soccer, Softball, Track and Field, Tennis, Volleyball, Wrestling, Cheerleading, Dance, Esports, Swimming
- Mascot: Knightreaux the Knight
- Nickname: Knights
- Teams: Varsity, Junior Varsity, Freshman, Middle School
- Team name: The Knights
- Test average: 29 ACT Average
- Newspaper: Knightly News
- Yearbook: Accolade
- Affiliation: Independent
- Website: episcopalbr.org

The Episcopal School of Baton Rouge is a private, college-preparatory, coeducational day school in Baton Rouge, Louisiana. Founded in 1965, it has approximately 900 students residing in East Baton Rouge Parish and surrounding areas, and has a student/teacher ratio of 10:1. The school serves students in grades PreK-3 through 12. Episcopal is located on a 50-acre (200,000 m^{2}) campus located in the eastern section of the city of Baton Rouge.

Episcopal receives no funds from the Episcopal Diocese of Louisiana, solely relying on funds generated from tuition, fees, capital giving, and the Annual Fund, a yearly fundraising program in which all donations made are used for investment in school plans and facilities. The current administrative leadership includes division heads for the Lower School, Middle School, and Upper School.

== History ==
Episcopal School of Baton Rouge was founded in 1964 originally as Episcopal High School with intentions of bringing an Episcopalian college preparatory school to Baton Rouge, Louisiana. Founding members of the school include G. Allen Penniman, Henry Klock, Dick H. Hearin, and A. C. Lewis. Originally on the site of St. James Episcopal Church of Baton Rouge and the old Baton Rouge Junior High School, Episcopal served approximately 300 students in grades 1–8. The first headmaster was Reverend Ralph Webster.

In 1968, students in grades 5-11 moved to the new campus located at 3200 Woodland Ridge Blvd. Students in grades 1-4 remained at the church until the new buildings were completed. The first senior class of 13 matriculated in 1969.

The school's gymnasium was destroyed in 1971 by a tornado spawned from Hurricane Edith, and much of the rest of the campus was heavily damaged.

Episcopal High School allotted space for pre-kindergarteners in 2005.

== Campus ==
=== Recent Buildings ===
In May 2017, the Academic Commons were constructed, which holds 17 classrooms. A year later in May 2018 the 23,000 square foot field house was constructed, and in spring of 2019 the Quest Center was constructed.

=== Other Notable buildings ===
Some other notable buildings on campus include: The Aldrich Library, Foster Hall, Frazer Hall, Lewis Family Memorial Chapel, Penniman Hall, Perkins Hall, and the Webster Refectory.

=== Campus Type ===
Episcopal is A suburban campus located North Of Jones Creek and South of Woodland Ridge Blvd.

== Athletics ==
Episcopal High athletics competes in the LHSAA.

Episcopal fields teams in many sports, including softball, soccer, basketball, football, volleyball, baseball, powerlifting, wrestling, swimming, tennis, golf, track and field, cross-country, cheerleading, esports, and dance.

=== Athletic Facilities ===
The Episcopal football, soccer, and track teams competes at the Episcopal Stadium, which seats nearly 2000 patrons. The basketball team competes in the main gym with a capacity of 700 patrons, and the wrestling and volleyball teams play at the Annslee Laura Phillips Gym, and the Tennis team practices at the tennis courts. The Baseball and Softball teams play at their respective fields located on the northwest of campus. There is also a practice field located beyond the Episcopal Stadium

All of the athletic teams practice in the field house located next to the football field.

=== State Championships ===
==== In total, Episcopal has 111 State Titles across all sports ====
The boys' cross-country team won 25 state AA titles in a row from 1996 to 2020, And the Boys Cross Country team has 34 State championships in total. The Girls cross-country team has 4 State titles since 2018.

The Boys Soccer team has 3 LHSAA state titles

The Golf team has 11 state titles

The Boys Track team has 18 State titles and the Girls Track team has 11 State titles

The Tennis team has 12 State Championships

The Baseball team won 1 state championship in 2004.

The Girls Powerlifting team has 4 state titles

The Swimming team has 2 state titles

The Girls Volleyball team has 11 state titles

== Notable alumni ==
- Lear deBessonet, Class of 1998, Tony Award-nominated director
- Katherine Lindley Dodson, Class of 1995, a pediatrician who heroically sacrificed her life to save her employees in a hostage situation on January 26, 2021.
- Todd Graves, Class of 1990, founder of the Louisiana-based fast-food chain Raising Cane's Chicken Fingers.
- Kaylee Hartung, Class of 2003, Reporter for ABC News
- Van Hiles, Class of 1993, is a former NFL defensive back. He played collegiately for the University of Kentucky and in the NFL for the Chicago Bears.
- Zachary Miller, Class of 1993, Brigadier General, United States Army
- Brooks Nader, Class of 2015, model
- Meghan O'Leary, Class of 2003, Olympic rower
- Jimmy Williams, Class of 1997, NFL cornerback who graduated from Vanderbilt University and played for the Houston Texans, Seattle Seahawks, and San Francisco 49ers.
- Will Wright, Class of 1977, co-founder of the American game development company Maxis and creator of The Sims.

== Notable non-graduates ==
- Reiley McClendon—actor, has appeared on such television shows as Will and Grace and CSI: Crime Scene Investigation.
