= Puritan Backroom =

Restaurant in Manchester, New Hampshire, United States

Coordinates: 43.0104°N 71.4543°W

The Puritan Backroom is a restaurant in Manchester, New Hampshire. Opened in 1974, the restaurant serves Greek-influenced New England cuisine and is known for their mudslides and for chicken tenders, which they claim to have invented in 1974. In 2020, it was awarded the title of America's Classic by the James Beard Foundation.

== History ==
Arthur Pappas and Louis Canotas, Greek emigrants to the United States, opened the Puritan Confectionery Company in 1917, selling candy and ice cream.

In 1974, their children built a room behind the candy store to house a restaurant. That same year, Charlie Pappas salvaged chicken pieces that had been trimmed from larger cuts, marinating and frying them to create chicken tenders. Although references to chicken fingers and "chicken sticks" predate the introduction of chicken tenders at Puritan, it is difficult to tell if these refer to modern chicken tenders; a 1952 recipe for chicken fingers, for example, involves cream of chicken soup, pie crust, and shredded chicken.

As of 2020, the restaurant was run by the third and fourth generations of the Pappas family, including US senator-elect Chris Pappas. Due to the importance of the New Hampshire presidential primary and the restaurant's location in the state's largest city, Puritan "has become a required stop for candidates passing through on the campaign trail. In an era of division, it is a rare nonpartisan space where everyone feels welcome." George H. W. Bush, Bill Clinton, Marco Rubio, and Mitt Romney are among the political figures who have visited the restaurant.

== Setbacks ==
On November 24, 2019, norovirus struck 18 people who attended a private function at the restaurant, and may have caused the death of one person. In March 2020, a fire caused about $80,000 in damage. In September 2020, the restaurant closed for a short time after a bartender tested positive for COVID-19.
