= Copeland's =

American restaurant chain offering New Orleans-style cuisine

Copeland's logo

Copeland's is an American casual sit-down restaurant chain serving New Orleans-style cuisine. Founded by Al Copeland in 1983, and significantly expanding in the 1990s, it claimed more than 40 locations in 12 states and offered a "steakhouse"-style expanded menu by 2004. It then significantly retracted over the next few years, closing half their restaurants with only 12 locations remaining in four states, with over half of their locations in Louisiana. The following years showed expansion west into Texas while adding the Copeland's Cheesecake Bistro, Fire and Ice restaurants, and Al's Diversified Food & Seasonings – a line of specialty foods and spices for large national restaurant chains.

== Founder ==
Al Copeland was an American Louisiana-raised entrepreneur known for founding Popeyes Chicken and Biscuits in 1972. Al Copeland Investments owns and operates restaurants including Copeland's of New Orleans, Copeland's Cheesecake Bistro, and Copeland's Social City Bistro.

== Menu ==
Copeland's menu items include French and Cajun inspired dishes that include a focused number of steak and seafood dish specialties. It also offers a special Sunday Brunch menu. It enjoys a broad spectrum of diners at every range of the demographic. Popular dishes include Eggplant Pirogue, Veal Copeland, and Jambalaya Pasta among other classic Copeland concoctions. There are also classic New Orleans dishes such as crawfish etouffee and shrimp Creole.

Recently, many Copeland's restaurants have started to specialize in particular styles of food, while some remain unchanged.
