= Al Copeland =

American entrepreneur (1944–2008)

- Born: Alvin Charles Copeland; February 2, 1944; New Orleans, Louisiana, U.S.
- Died: March 23, 2008 (aged 64); Munich, Germany
- Resting place: Metairie Cemetery
- Other name: Big Al
- Occupation: Entrepreneur
- Known for: Founding the fast food chain Popeyes
- Children: 9

Alvin Charles "Big Al" Copeland (February 2, 1944 – March 23, 2008) was an American entrepreneur who founded the Popeyes fast food chain. He was also a successful restaurateur who created many successful upscale restaurants.

== Personal life ==
Born in New Orleans, Louisiana, Copeland had a humble beginning with his family living at one point in the St. Thomas public housing project. Copeland's father left the family shortly after Alvin ("Al"), the youngest of three sons, was born. Copeland did not complete high school, having left at 16, and worked at Schwegmann Brothers Giant Supermarkets store in Gentilly as a soda jerk and then for Tastee Donut, a doughnut chain partially owned by his brother, Gil. At 18, Copeland sold his car to purchase one doughnut location from his brother. This experience exposed him to the restaurant business and franchising.

While Copeland never completed high school, he used his wealth to benefit education programs, including establishing the Alvin C. Copeland Endowed Chair of Franchising at Louisiana State University, providing funding for the Delgado Community College chef apprentice program, and supporting the National Food Service Institute.

He had nine children – five sons and four daughters – by four wives. His eldest son, Al Copeland Jr., became the CEO of Al Copeland Investments, of which he is also the chairman, in 2003.

Copeland became a New Orleans icon due to his flamboyant lifestyle, including his eponymous power boat racing teams, extravagant weddings, and his annual Christmas light show at his mansion located in an upscale neighborhood in Metairie. Copeland was both admired and disliked by many in New Orleans for his brash style. Upon Copeland's death, New Orleans newspaper columnist Chris Rose, who was often critical of Copeland, noted, "I'm a big fan of over-the-top. A big fan of celebration. A big fan of lust for life. A big fan of Big Fun. Copeland epitomized these things. He was one more guy who put his life on display for all to see, another example of talking too much, living too large and laughing too loud – those New Orleans attributes that sometimes make folks elsewhere a little leery of this place."

== Popeyes Chicken & Biscuits ==
In 1972, Al Copeland founded the Popeyes Chicken & Biscuits fast food chain in the New Orleans suburb of Arabi in St. Bernard Parish. He named the restaurant after Jimmy "Popeye" Doyle in the 1971 film "The French Connection" (but not Popeye the Sailor). Copeland began franchising his restaurant in 1976, opening the first franchise restaurant in Baton Rouge, Louisiana. Approximately 500 outlets were added over the next 10 years, followed by 200 more during a period of slower expansion.

In March 1989, Popeyes, then the third-largest chicken chain, purchased Church's Chicken, the second largest. The parent company, Al Copeland Enterprises, operated both chains separately. Combined, the company had over 2,000 locations. Criticism of the merger included the resulting presence of competing locations. Efforts were made to close under-performing stores and sell franchises; however, operational improvements could not overcome financial burdens resulting from the merger.

The Church's purchase was heavily financed with the security being the assets of Popeyes and the acquired company. In 1990, Al Copeland Enterprises had $391 million in debts. The debt reached more than $400 million by April 1991 when Copeland filed for Chapter 11 bankruptcy protection for the company. Creditors had petitioned for involuntary bankruptcy and efforts to have the petition dismissed had failed. In October 1992, the bankruptcy court approved a plan submitted by a group of Copeland's creditors that created America's Favorite Chicken Company, Inc. (aka AFC). AFC served as the new parent company for Popeyes and Church's.

Although Copeland lost Popeyes in the bankruptcy, he retained the rights to some Popeyes recipes and products. He manufactured the spices through his Diversified Foods & Seasonings plants located in Metairie, Madisonville, New Orleans, Mobile, San Antonio, and Nebraska City. The Diversified Foods & Seasonings contract with Popeyes extends through 2029.

== Other businesses and investments ==
Copeland owned several restaurant chains, including Copeland's, Copeland's Cheesecake Bistro, Amor deBrazil, Straya, and Copeland's Social City, as well as the Improv comedy clubs located in California and Pittsburgh, and three hotels.

== Annual Christmas display ==
Copeland became a local celebrity in New Orleans through his annual Christmas light display. Many national media organizations have ranked the display, most notably the Today show, which ranked it in the top three. In the display's heyday, the Jefferson Parish Sheriff's Office provided traffic control, and cars would back-up into surrounding subdivisions. While Copeland's display was the main attraction, surrounding homes also contributed to the atmosphere, and foot-traffic between displays and neighborhood parties was significant. Not all neighbors were pleased with the annual festivities, and in 1983 he was sued by his neighbors to remove the display. In 1991, a judge permitted Copeland to display a scaled-down version of the display. Copeland's display not only had elaborate lights, but he also would usually park his luxurious and exotic cars in front of his driveway. He provided free popcorn, candy, and children's toys during his final years. In 2008, the display was markedly toned down after he died. The annual display at his residence near Lake Pontchartrain will now stop and be moved to a park. New Orleans newspaper columnist Chris Rose, on informing his children of Copeland's death stated, "I realized it was like telling a kid that Santa Claus was dead."

== Public controversies ==
In 1993, Copeland made an unsuccessful bid for a Louisiana gambling license. The successful bidder, Robert J. Guidry, later testified that he (Guidry) had bribed then-governor Edwin Edwards to secure the license. Eight years later, Guidry and Copeland encountered each other at an upscale restaurant in New Orleans, Morton's The Steakhouse. A melee ensued, involving Copeland, Guidry, and Guidry's sons. Witnesses said that Copeland's then-wife (who was six months pregnant) was knocked to the ground. Both she and Copeland, who were celebrating their first wedding anniversary, were hospitalized. The Guidry group spent the night in jail.

Copeland had a very public feud with horror novelist Anne Rice in 1997 regarding Copeland's opening of Straya, a restaurant on St. Charles Avenue in New Orleans. Rice placed a full page ad in the February 7 New Orleans Times-Picayune newspaper, calling the restaurant "hideous", "a monstrosity", and "nothing short of an abomination".

Copeland's third marriage ended with significant controversy. The third divorce's original presiding judge, Ronald Bodenheimer, pleaded guilty to promising a custody deal favorable to Copeland in return for a possible seafood contract and other benefits. Copeland contributed to the Bodenheimer campaign, and, according to Bodenheimer testimony, had personally contacted Bodenheimer regarding the custody matter. Bodenheimer stated that he had been summoned to a home owned by a Copeland business and stated that Copeland told him, "We supported you because you were the kind of guy who would do the right thing. And the right thing is to keep me and Alex together." At the time of his testimony, Bodenheimer was the subject of a significant federal probe. Two Copeland associates, as well as Bodenheimer, went to jail for participating in the conspiracy. Other than the Bodenheimer testimony, Copeland was never personally accused of participating.

== Illness, death, and legacy ==
In December 2007, Copeland began treatment for a malignant tumor of the salivary glands, caused by Merkel cell carcinoma, a rare form of cancer. Copeland had sought experimental treatments in Germany but died in Munich on Easter Sunday, March 23, 2008, aged 64. He was buried in Metairie Cemetery.

In 2008 the Al Copeland Foundation was established under his name. It provides cancer services primarily at Louisiana State University (LSU) and established the Al Copeland/Cancer Crusaders Endowed chair in Endocrine Cancer at LSU in 2011.
