= Bail bondsman =

Agent that secures an individual's release in court

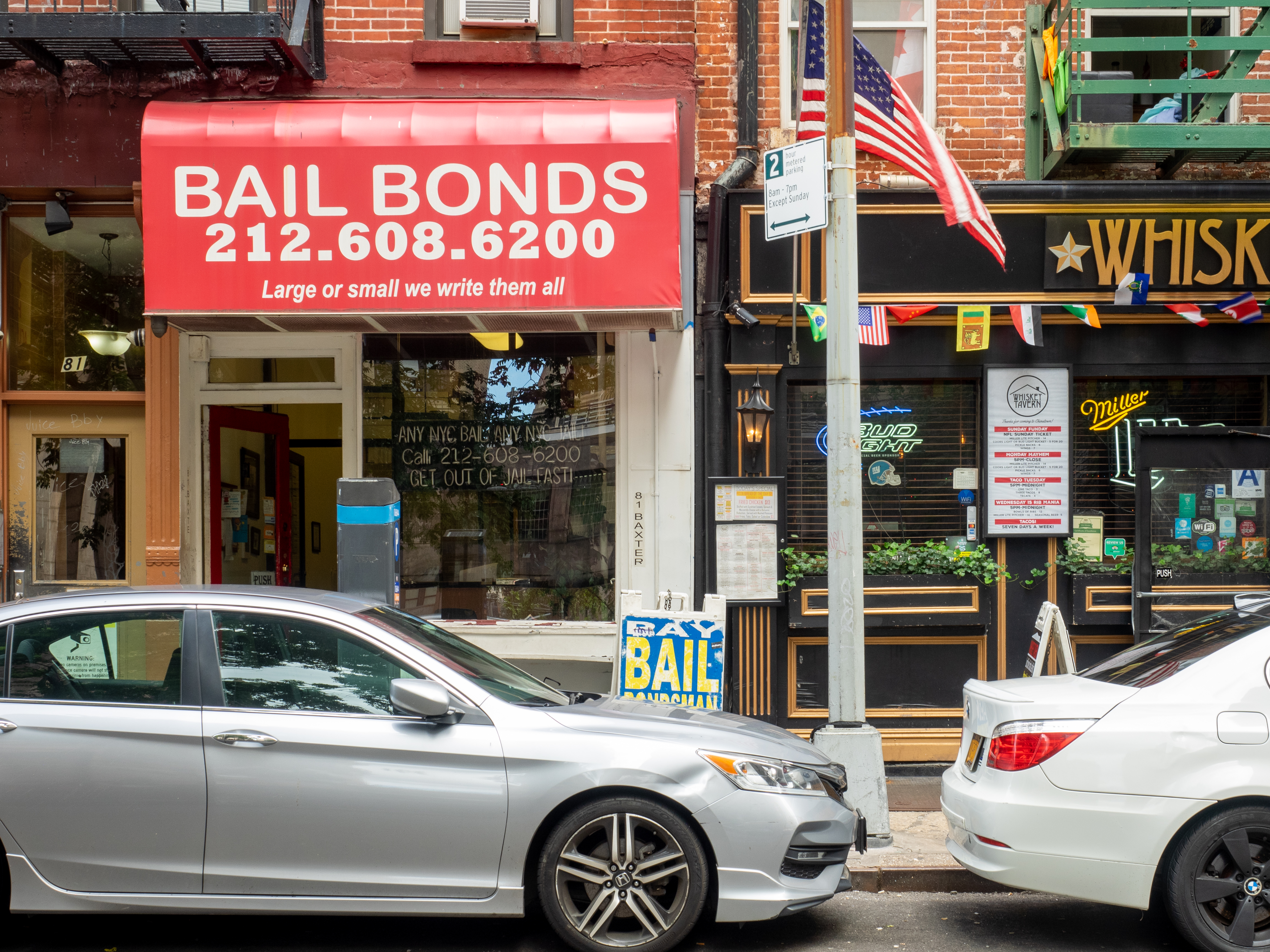
A bail bondsman located outside of the New York City Criminal Court in Manhattan, New York City

A bail bondsman, bail bond agent or bond dealer is any person, agency or corporation that will act as a surety and pledge money or property as bail for the appearance of a defendant in court.

Bail bond agents are almost exclusively found in the United States because the practice of bail bonding is illegal in most other countries. The industry is represented by various trade associations with the Professional Bail Agents of the United States and the American Bail Coalition forming an umbrella group for bail agents and surety companies and the National Association of Fugitive Recovery Agents representing the bounty hunting industry. Organizations that represent the legal profession, including the American Bar Association and the National District Attorneys Association, oppose the practice of bond dealing by claiming that it discriminates against poor and middle-class defendants while doing nothing for public safety.

== History ==
The first modern bail bonds business in the United States was established by Peter P. McDonough in San Francisco in 1898. However, clay tablets from ca. 2750 BC describe surety bail bond agreements made in the Akkadian city of Eshnunna, located in modern-day Iraq.

Bondsmen obtain the release of defendants from jail by paying sums of currency and pledging, sometimes with their own property as collateral, that said defendants will show up for court.

== Modern practice ==
According to 1996 figures for the U.S., one quarter of all released felony defendants fail to appear at trial, but those released via surety bond appear more frequently than other defendants.

Laws governing the practice of bail bonds vary by state, although the Uniform Criminal Extradition Act, sponsored by the Uniform Law Commission, has been widely adopted. The practice of commercial bail bonds is unlawful in the states of Illinois, Kentucky, Oregon, and Wisconsin.

Applicable federal laws include the Excessive Bail Clause of the Eighth Amendment and the Bail Reform Act of 1984, incorporated into the Comprehensive Crime Control Act of 1984.

=== Training and requirements ===
There are 18 states that do not establish control over the qualifications of bail recovery agents through statute or administrative code. In most jurisdictions, bond agents must be licensed to carry on business within the state. Some insurance companies may offer insurance coverage that includes local bail bonds for traffic related arrests.

In the state of California, bail bond agents must be certified and licensed by the California Department of Insurance.

=== Pricing ===
Bond agents generally charge a fee of 10% for a state charge and 15% for a federal charge, with a minimum of $100 in such states as Florida, required in order to post a bond for the full amount of the bail. This fee is not refundable and represents the bond agent's compensation for services rendered.

Nevada is one of the states which allow an arrestee to use a residence as collateral for a bail bond. To do this, the applicant must register a deed of trust and name the bonding agency as beneficiary. The agency thus gains a lien on the property, but can only take ownership if the defendant fails to comply with all court instructions and rules.

In some states, such as Florida, bond agencies are responsible for paying any forfeitures, and risk being denied permission to write further bonds in the state if they fail to do so.

=== Recovery and bounty hunting ===
If the defendant fails to appear in court, the bond agent must bring the defendant to the jurisdiction of the court in order to be released from further liability of the bond. A bond agent may employ a bounty hunter for that purpose. Only the Philippines has a surety bail system similar in structure and function as the US. In the past, courts in Australia, India and South Africa have disciplined lawyers for professional misconduct for setting up commercial bail arrangements.

Some states, such as North Carolina, have outlawed the use or licensing of "bounty hunters", requiring instead that bail bondsmen apprehend their own fugitives. Bond agents may also attempt to recover money forfeited to the court for the failure of a defendants to appear by suing indemnitors, any persons who guaranteed the defendants' appearances in court, or the defendants themselves.

=== Regulation ===
As of 2007 four states—Illinois, Kentucky, Oregon, and Wisconsin—had completely banned commercial bail bonding, usually substituting the 10% cash deposit alternative described below. Some of these states specifically allow AAA and similar organizations to continue providing bail bond services pursuant to insurance contracts or membership agreements. While not outright illegal, the practice of bail bond services has effectively ended in Massachusetts as of 2014. Most of the US legal establishment, including the American Bar Association and the National District Attorneys Association, is against the bail bond business, arguing that it discriminates against poor and middle-class defendants, does nothing for public safety, and usurps decisions that ought to be made by the justice system. Charitable bail funds have sprung up to combat the issue of discrimination, using donations to cover the bail amount for the arrested person. The economically discriminatory effect of the bond system has been controversial and subject to attempts at reform since the 1910s. The market evidence indicates that judges in setting bail demanded lower probabilities of flight from minority defendants— see, for example, Frank Murphy's institution of a bond department at Detroit, Michigan's Recorder's Court. Furthermore, the economic incentives of bonding for profit make it less likely that defendants charged with minor crimes (who are assigned lower amounts of bail) will be released. This is because a bail bondsman will not find it profitable to work on matters where the percentage of profit would yield $10 or $20. As such, bail bondsmen help release people with higher amounts of bail who are charged with higher crimes, creating an imbalance in the numbers of people charged with minor crimes (low level misdemeanors) who remain in pre-trial detention and increasing jail expenditures for this category of crimes.

==== California ====
In California, bail is heavily regulated by the California Penal Code, California Insurance Code and California Code of Regulations. All violations of the aforementioned constitute felony violations via California Insurance Code 1814— including administrative regulatory codes such as record keeping, how solicitations are conducted, collateral and treatment of arrestees. Under California law it is a crime for a bail bondsman to solicit business at a county jail.

=== Criticism ===
Several high-profile cases involving bondsman misconduct have led to calls for increased regulation of the industry or outright abolition of the bail for profit industry. One of the most prominent cases, in Louisiana, involved bribery of judges by a bail bonding agency. A far-reaching FBI investigation code-named "Operation Wrinkled Robe" led to criminal charges and removal proceedings for several judges, such as Ronald Bodenheimer, and police officers.

The American Civil Liberties Union (ACLU) has criticized the practice of bail bonds as a form of injustice against low-income communities, fueling mass incarceration of innocent people, with the ACLU recommending automated text messages or robocalls for court appearances.

=== Alternatives ===
In addition to the use of bail bonds, a defendant may be released under other terms. These alternatives include pretrial services programs, own recognizance or signature bond, cash bond, surety bond, property bond, and citation release. The choice of these alternatives is determined by the court.
