= Guthrie's =

American restaurant chain

Guthrie's Chicken Inc.
- Trade name: Guthrie's
- Type: Private
- Industry: Restaurants
- Genre: Fast casual
- Founded: 1965; 61 years ago Haleyville, Alabama, U.S.
- Founder: Hal Guthrie
- Headquarters: Auburn, Alabama, U.S.
- Number of locations: 73 (2026)
- Area served: Alabama, Arizona, Arkansas, Colorado, Florida, Georgia, Idaho, Kentucky, Mississippi, Nevada, North Carolina, Ohio, Tennessee, and West Virginia (12 states in the U.S.)
- Key people: Joe Kelly Guthrie (CEO)
- Products: Chicken fingers, French fries, Coleslaw, Texas toast, Signature sauce, Sweet tea
- Owner: Guthrie family
- Number of employees: 800 (2021)
- Website: guthrieschicken.com

Guthrie's is a fast casual, franchised restaurant chain headquartered in Auburn, Alabama, United States, best known for being the original chicken fingers restaurant. The first location was opened in Haleyville, in 1965 by Hal Guthrie. By 1978, the menu adapted to consist primarily of chicken fingers, signature sauce, french fries, coleslaw and Texas toast, becoming the first to largely center its menu on chicken fingers. Today, the chain has grown to include 73 stores across the United States with active plans to expand further.

== History ==
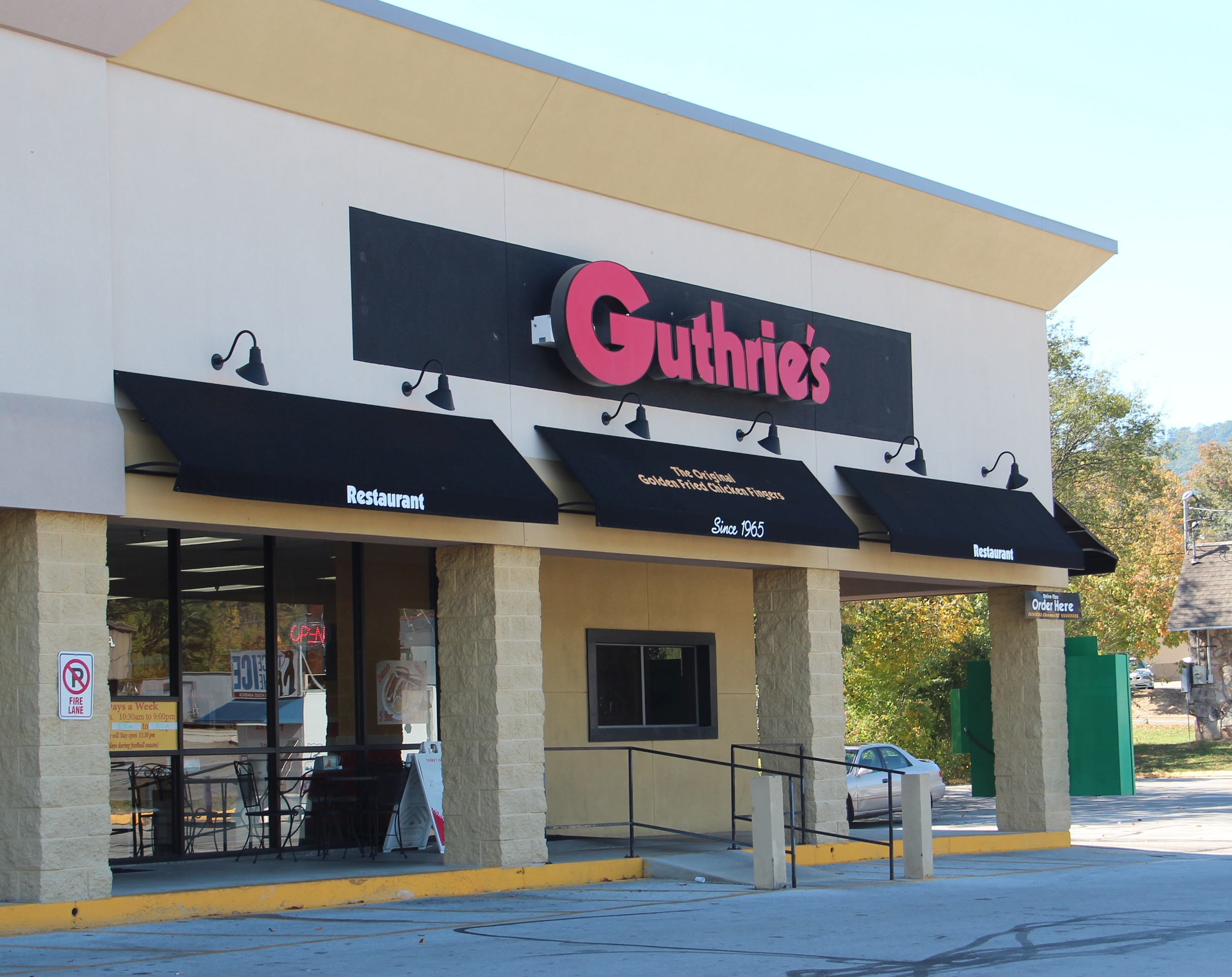
Guthrie's in Trenton, Georgia

The original Guthrie's was opened in Haleyville, Alabama, in 1965 by Hal Guthrie. The restaurant originally served a full menu of Southern food, but in 1978 it was changed to focus primarily on chicken fingers. This switch resulted in Guthrie's becoming the first restaurant to have a menu largely centered on chicken fingers. By 1982, a second location would open in Auburn and a third in Athens, Georgia by 1984. By 1997, eight locations were open and all were under the ownership of the Guthrie family.

Many early stores were constructed adjacent to major universities: Auburn University, University of Georgia, University of Alabama, University of Florida and Florida State University. Expansion outside of college towns did not commence until the opening of the Gardendale location in 1997. By 2005, the 26 restaurants in the chain were all under the ownership of the Guthrie family. In April 2005 it was announced that the company was looking to expand further out of Alabama into Florida, Georgia, Louisiana, and Mississippi, and that they were also looking to franchise the brand for the first time. By 2015, the restaurant had expanded into Kentucky, and in 2022, Guthrie's opened their first restaurant in Mississippi in Oxford near the University of Mississippi.

Two years later, a Guthrie's location opened in Las Vegas, Nevada, marking the company's first location in both Nevada and the western US.

== See also ==
- List of fast-food chicken restaurants
