= Goujon (automobile) =

The Goujon was a French automobile manufactured from 1896 until 1901. A four-seater voiturette, it featured an air-cooled 3½ hp engine.
