= Goujon (food) =

Fried food

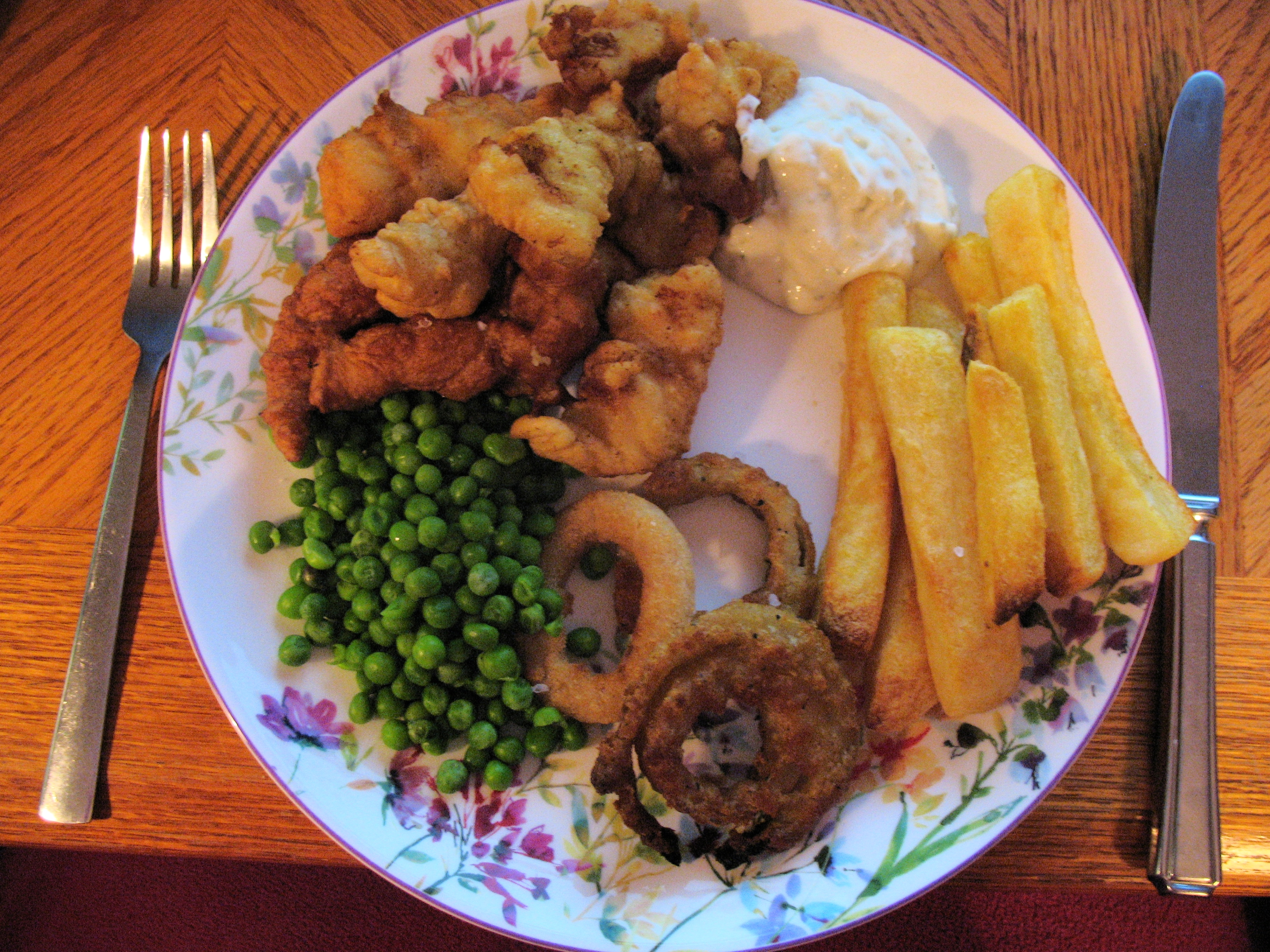
Battered fish goujons with battered onion rings, peas, chips, and tartare sauce

A goujon (from French: goujon [ɡuʒɔ̃] 'dowel', 'pin') is a strip taken from underside of the muscular fish tail or chicken breast, sometimes breaded or coated in batter and deep fried.
