= Popeyes =

American multinational fast food chain

Popeyes Louisiana Kitchen, Inc.
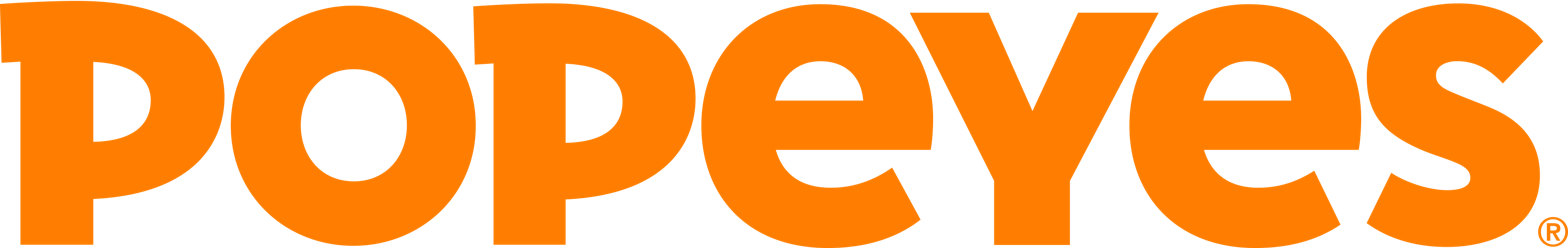
- Logo used since 2019

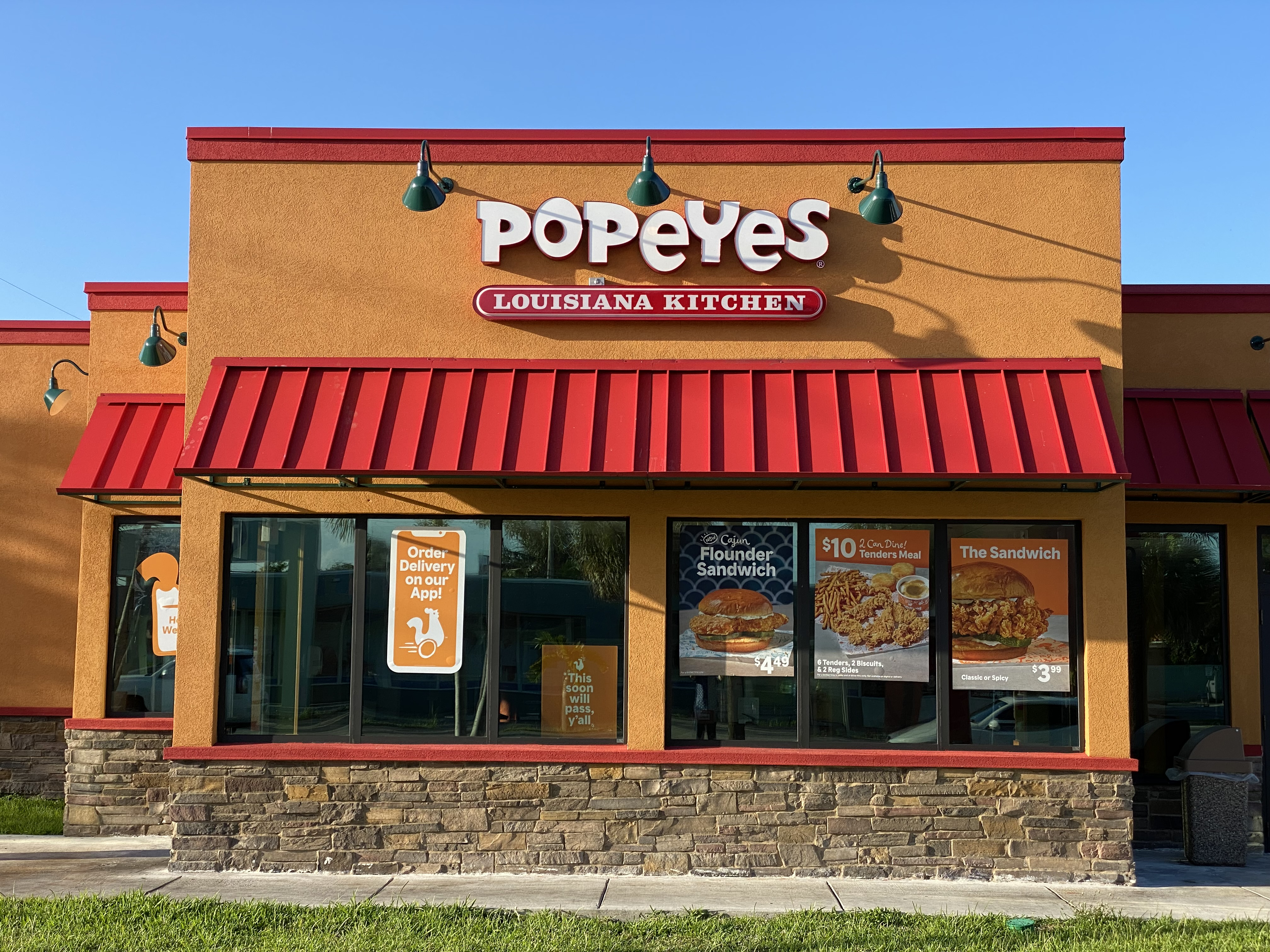
- A Popeyes restaurant in West Miami, Florida, United States
- Trade name: Popeyes
- Formerly: Popeyes Chicken & Biscuits; Popeyes Famous Fried Chicken & Biscuits
- Type: Subsidiary
- Industry: Restaurant
- Genre: Fast food
- Founded: June 12, 1972; 54 years ago (as Chicken on the Run), Arabi, Louisiana, United States
- Founder: Al Copeland
- Headquarters: Miami-Dade County, Florida, and Toronto, Ontario, United States and Canada
- Number of locations: 5,413 (2026)
- Area served: List: Albania; Andorra; Azerbaijan; Bahamas; Bahrain; Brazil; Canada; Cayman Islands; China; Costa Rica; Cyprus; Czech Republic; Dominican Republic; El Salvador; France; Germany; Guyana; Honduras; Hong Kong; Hungary; India; Indonesia; Italy; Ireland; Jamaica; Jordan; Kazakhstan; Kosovo; Kuwait; Lebanon; Mexico; New Zealand; North Macedonia; Palestine; Panama; Paraguay; Peru; Philippines; Poland; Puerto Rico; Romania; Saudi Arabia; Singapore; South Korea; Spain; Sri Lanka; Suriname; Switzerland; Taiwan; Trinidad and Tobago; Turkey; United Arab Emirates; United Kingdom; United States; Vietnam
- Key people: Felipe Athayde (president); Matthew Brandon (CFO); J. Patrick Doyle (executive chairman of RBI)
- Products: Fried chicken; French fries; Cajun cuisine; Seafood; Soft drinks; Biscuits; Desserts
- Net income: ▲US$ 228 million (2021)
- Parent: Restaurant Brands International (2017–present)
- Website: popeyes.com

Popeyes Louisiana Kitchen, Inc. (Note: Also known as Popeyes, and formerly named Popeyes Chicken & Biscuits and Popeyes Famous Fried Chicken & Biscuits.) is an American multinational chain of Southern fried chicken restaurants founded in 1972 in New Orleans, and headquartered in Miami-Dade County, Florida. It is currently a subsidiary of Toronto-based Restaurant Brands International. As of 2026, Popeyes operates a global network of 5,413 restaurants across 51 countries and territories, including 48 US states, the District of Columbia and Puerto Rico. About 50 locations are company-owned while the other approximately 98% are franchised.

== History ==
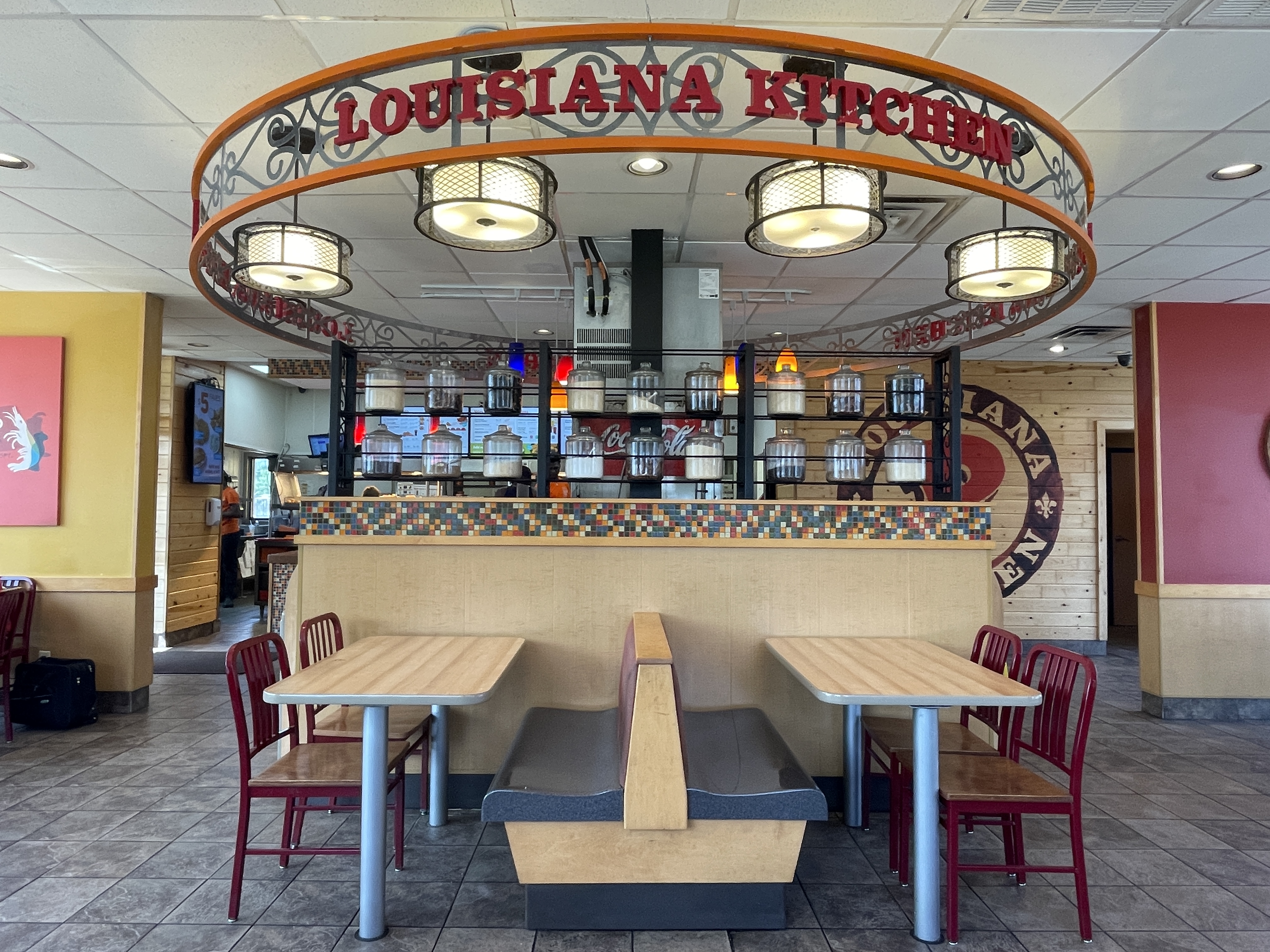
Interior of Popeyes in Tallulah, Louisiana

Popeyes was founded by Al Copeland (1944–2008) in Arabi, Louisiana, a suburb of New Orleans, Louisiana. It first opened its doors on June 12, 1972, as "Chicken on the Run". Copeland wanted to compete with Kentucky Fried Chicken, but his restaurant failed after several months. Copeland reopened the restaurant four days later as Popeyes Mighty Good Chicken. By 1975, the company had been renamed as Popeyes Famous Fried Chicken. Copeland started franchising his restaurant in 1976, beginning in Louisiana. The chain expanded to Canada in 1984, and opened its 500th restaurant in 1985. B. P. Newman of Laredo, Texas, acquired several franchises in Texas and surrounding states. Two hundred additional locations were added during a period of slower expansion.

By 1990, Copeland Enterprises was in default on $391 million in debts it had taken on in its 1989 purchase of Church's, a rival fast food chain also focusing in Southern fried chicken, and by April 1991, the company filed for bankruptcy protection. In October 1992, the court approved a plan by a group of Copeland's creditors that resulted in the creation of America's Favorite Chicken Company, Inc. (AFC) to serve as the new parent company for Popeyes and Church's. AFC went public in 2001 with initial public offering (IPO) of $142,818,479, and began trading on the NASDAQ under ticker symbol AFCE. On December 29, 2004, AFC sold Church's to Arcapita (formerly Crescent Capital Investments) retaining Popeyes.

On August 8, 2000, Popeyes announced a franchise development plan/agreement that included 35 new restaurant locations around Australia in a bid to solidify their presence within the Asia Pacific region. All were to be located in Sydney, the capital city of New South Wales.

On January 21, 2014, AFC was renamed as Popeyes Louisiana Kitchen, Inc., and its NASDAQ ticker symbol was changed to PLKI.

On June 17, 2014, Popeyes announced it had re-acquired full control of its seasonings, recipes, and other proprietary food preparation techniques from Diversified Foods & Seasonings, which remained under the control of Al Copeland and his estate after the creditor sale of Popeyes to AFC. Popeyes had continued to license the seasonings, recipes, and techniques from DF&S for a yearly "spice royalty", before buying them outright for $43 million. DF&S remains the main supplier for Popeyes until at least 2029.

=== Acquisition by Restaurant Brands International ===
On February 21, 2017, Restaurant Brands International announced a deal to buy Popeyes for US$1.8 billion. On March 27, 2017, the deal closed with RBI purchasing Popeyes at $79 per share via Orange, Inc, an indirect subsidiary of RBI.

=== Name ===
Alvin C. Copeland claimed he named the stores after the fictional detective Jimmy "Popeye" Doyle (portrayed by Gene Hackman) in the 1971 film The French Connection, which came out a year before the chain was founded, and not the comic strip character Popeye the Sailor.

However, the company's early brand became deeply tied to the cartoon star with its sponsorship of the Popeye & Pals children's show in New Orleans, and the character appeared on items from packaging to racing boats.

The chain later acquired rights to use Popeye the Sailor for marketing and used this for 35 years. In late November 2012, AFC announced the mutual termination of their licensing contract with King Features Syndicate, effectively ending their association with the Popeye characters.

The name is spelled "Popeyes", without the apostrophe commonly used by other restaurant chains such as McDonald's and Hardee's. Copeland claimed facetiously that he was "too poor" to afford an apostrophe.

== Products ==
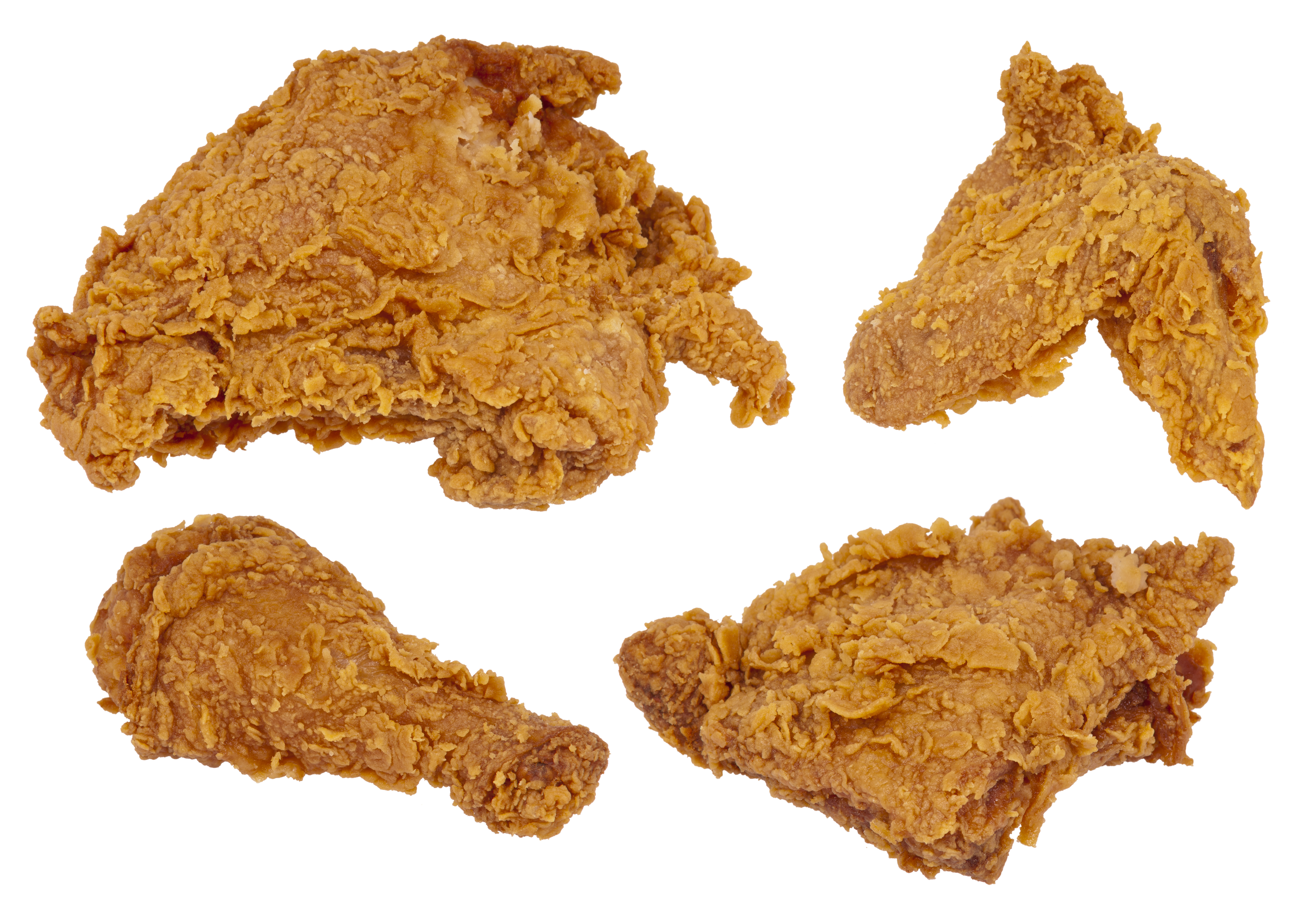
Popeyes mild chicken

Popeyes serves chicken dishes in mild and spicy flavors and offers sides such as red beans and rice, Cajun fries, mashed potatoes with Cajun-style gravy, Cajun rice, macaroni and cheese, coleslaw, and biscuits. In addition to chicken, Popeyes also serves seafood entrées such as shrimp and catfish. On October 30, 2006, AFC announced that Popeyes planned to introduce a trans fat-free biscuit as well as french fries containing one gram of trans fat by year-end. On November 18, 2011, AFC announced that, for the Thanksgiving holiday, Popeyes would release a Fried Turducken sandwich that would show off the first ever Turducken patty. On July 29, 2013, AFC began offering a special entree of fried chicken strips dipped in waffle batter, which was already a proven success in some markets. For a limited time only in 2017, Popeyes offered "Sweet and Crunchy" chicken, fried chicken tenders coated in shortbread cookie breading. In 2021, Popeyes introduced a flounder sandwich.

=== Chicken sandwich ===
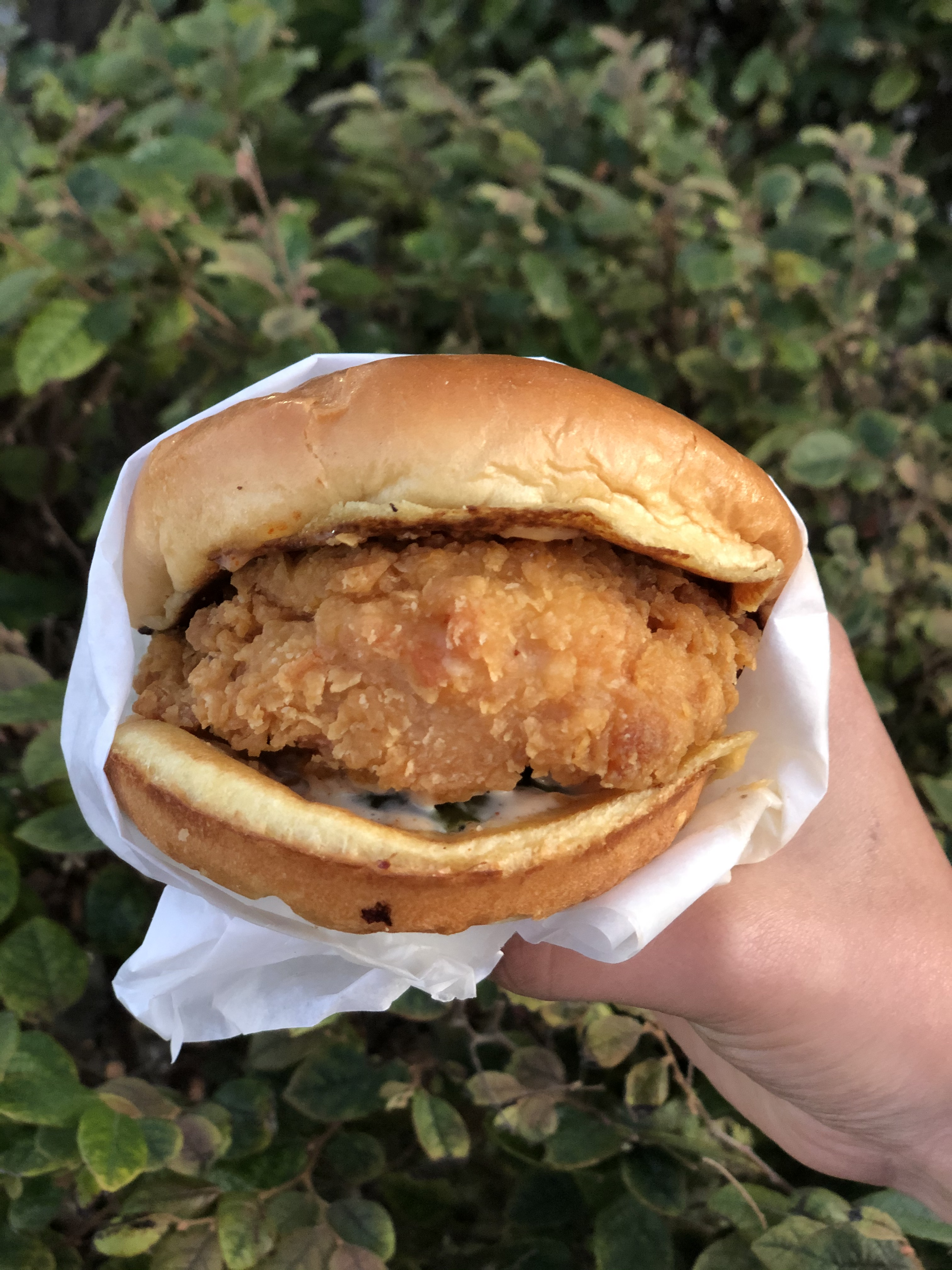
Popeyes Chicken Sandwich (Spicy)

Popeyes began selling a chicken sandwich in August 2019 to compete with Chick-fil-A's similar flagship sandwich. The company first launched the sandwich at Long Beach restaurant Sweet Dixie Kitchen, a locally-famous spot that had become known for reselling fried chicken that it had purchased at Popeyes. The sandwich launched nationwide to all locations in the US on August 12, 2019, but had some advance openings at the beginning of 2019.

The marketing campaign, designed by advertising agency GSD&M started on August 12, 2019, with a tweet on Popeyes' Twitter feed. The new sandwich went viral immediately and prompted responses from nearly every fast food chain including McDonald's, Chick-Fil-A, and Wendy's. Popeyes reported a 103% increase in traffic in the days following the launch of the sandwich. The sandwich helped Popeyes gather an estimated $23 million in free publicity since its launch. Popeyes stores routinely sold out of the sandwich and experienced long lines, and a man outside of a Maryland Popeyes chain was stabbed to death during a dispute over cutting in line for a chicken sandwich. Locations across the US were supposed to have enough materials to last them until the end of September. Instead, restaurants were almost entirely sold out after less than two weeks. On August 27, approximately two weeks after the launch, Popeyes announced that it had officially sold out of the chicken sandwich across the country. One person in Tennessee sued Popeyes, claiming that his inability to get the sandwich has caused him to be "hustled out of money", making Popeyes guilty of "false advertising" along with "deceptive business practices". On October 28, 2019, Popeyes announced that the chicken sandwich would return to locations across the US on November 3. Popeyes chicken sandwich is made of buttermilk-battered white meat on a brioche bun along with pickles and mayonnaise or spicy Cajun spread.

In September 2020, Popeyes' chicken sandwich went on sale in Canada.

It is ranked as the "best" item in the menu, by TheTakeout.

== Style and marketing ==
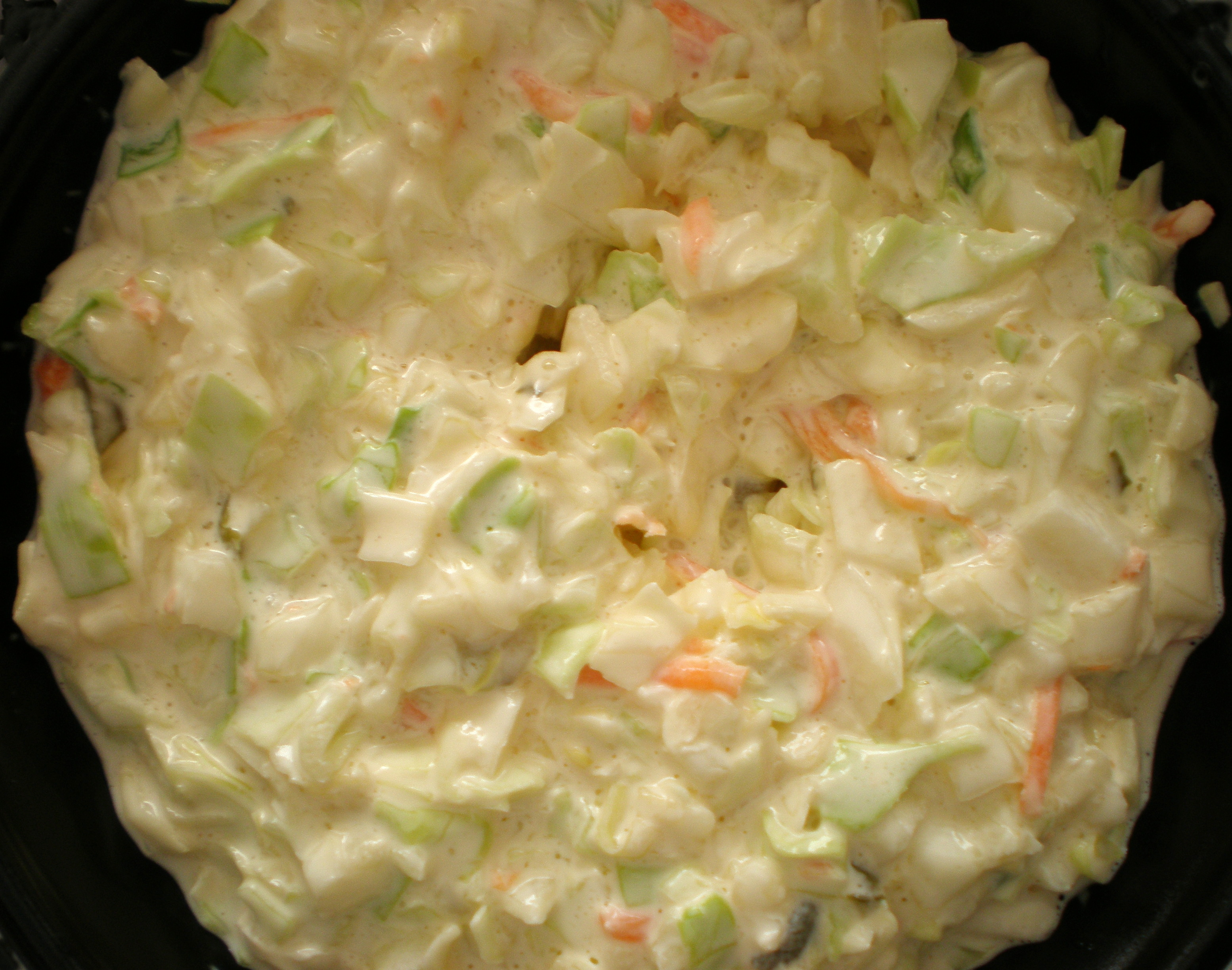
Coleslaw from Popeyes Louisiana Kitchen

The restaurants' exteriors have a distinctive orange and white color scheme. The original locations had a black lava rock exterior with a red shingled roof. Most older locations have covered the rock exterior to conform with the current orange stucco appearance. During the 1970s and 1980s, the company occasionally licensed characters from the Popeye comic strip to use in its advertising. TV and radio ads often use New Orleans-style music, along with the trademark "Love That Chicken" jingle sung by New Orleans funk and R&B musician Dr. John. It is one of various slogans it has used.

In 2009, Popeyes introduced "Annie the Chicken Queen", a fictitious, upbeat, African-American Popeyes chef played by actress Deidrie Henry. The character is meant to be "honest, vibrant, youthful and authentic" according to Dick Lynch, Popeyes Chief Marketing Officer. "Everyone has a relative or a good friend who will give it to them straight, and that's what Annie is all about", Lynch said.

Popeyes has sponsored various NASCAR drivers since 2000. That year, NASCAR Busch Series driver Rich Bickle was sponsored by the company for six races, while Mark McFarland received a one-race deal in the same series the following season. In March 2018, Tyler Matthews made his NASCAR Camping World Truck Series debut in the No. 99 Popeyes truck at Martinsville Speedway, and the company also sponsored Brennan Poole and Vizion Motorsports for that year's Truck Series season finale at Homestead–Miami Speedway.

== International franchises ==
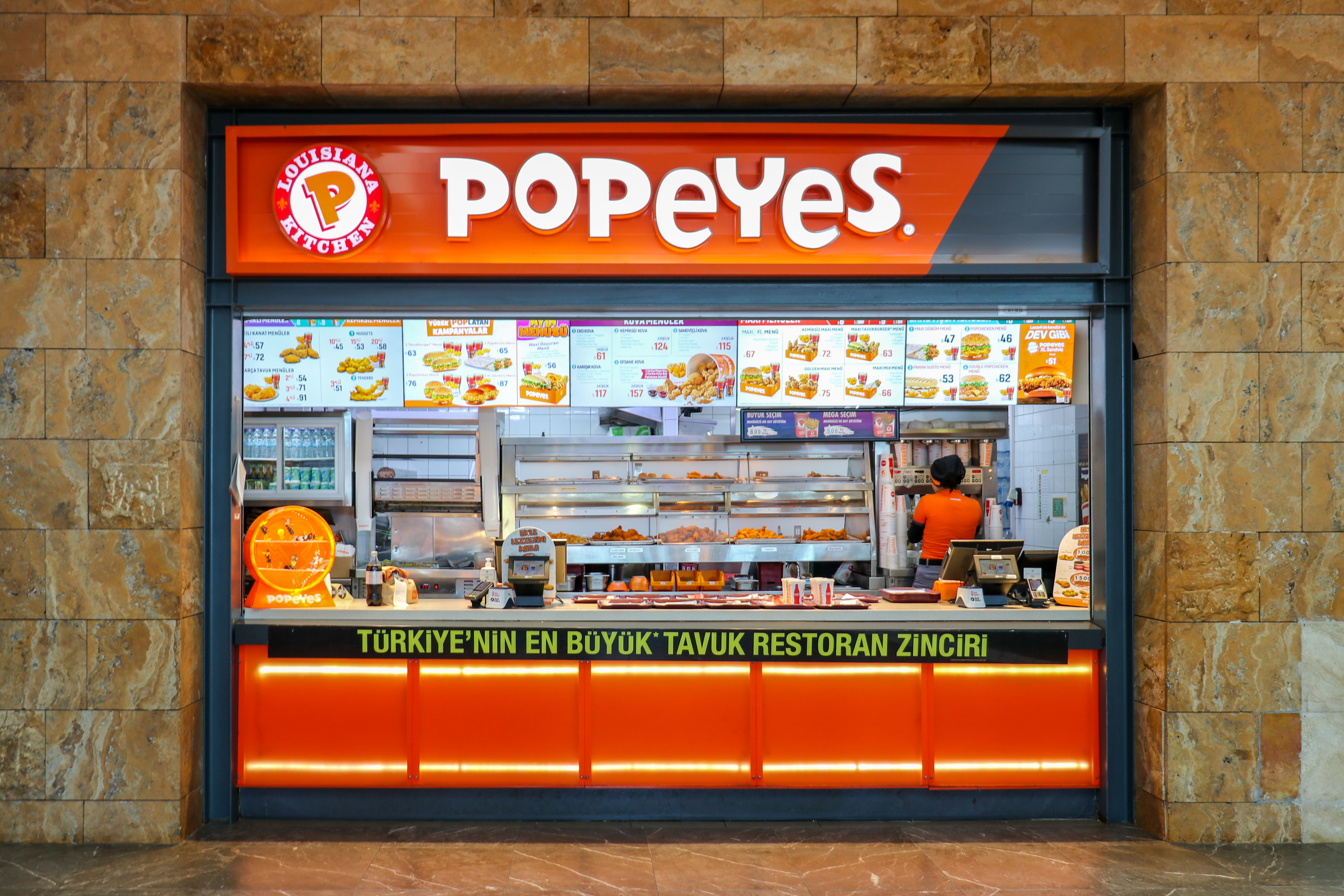
A Popeyes restaurant in the Forum Shopping Mall in Trabzon, Turkey

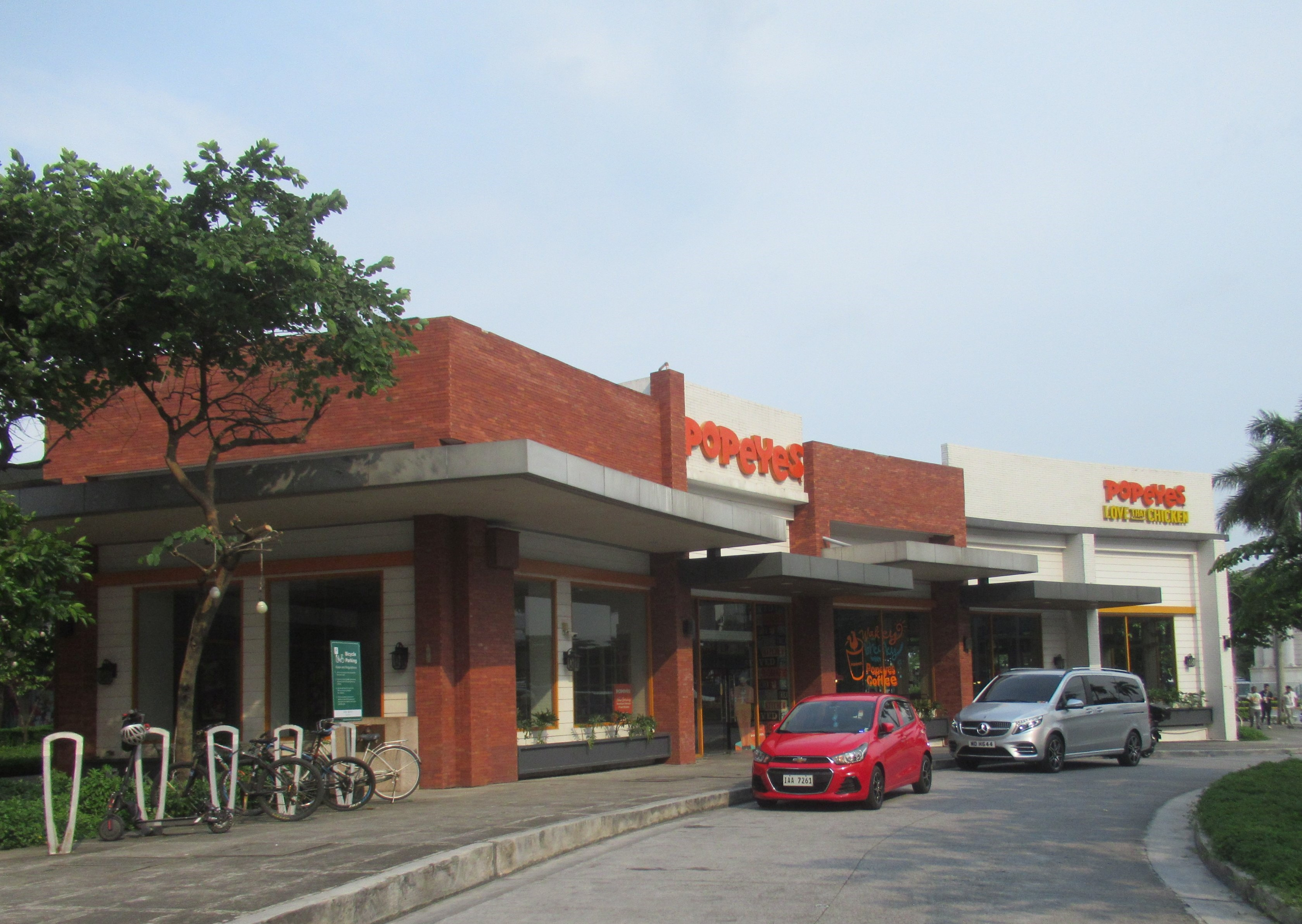
A Popeyes restaurant in Arcovia City in Pasig, Philippines

A Popeyes restaurant in Lippo Cikarang in Cikarang, Indonesia

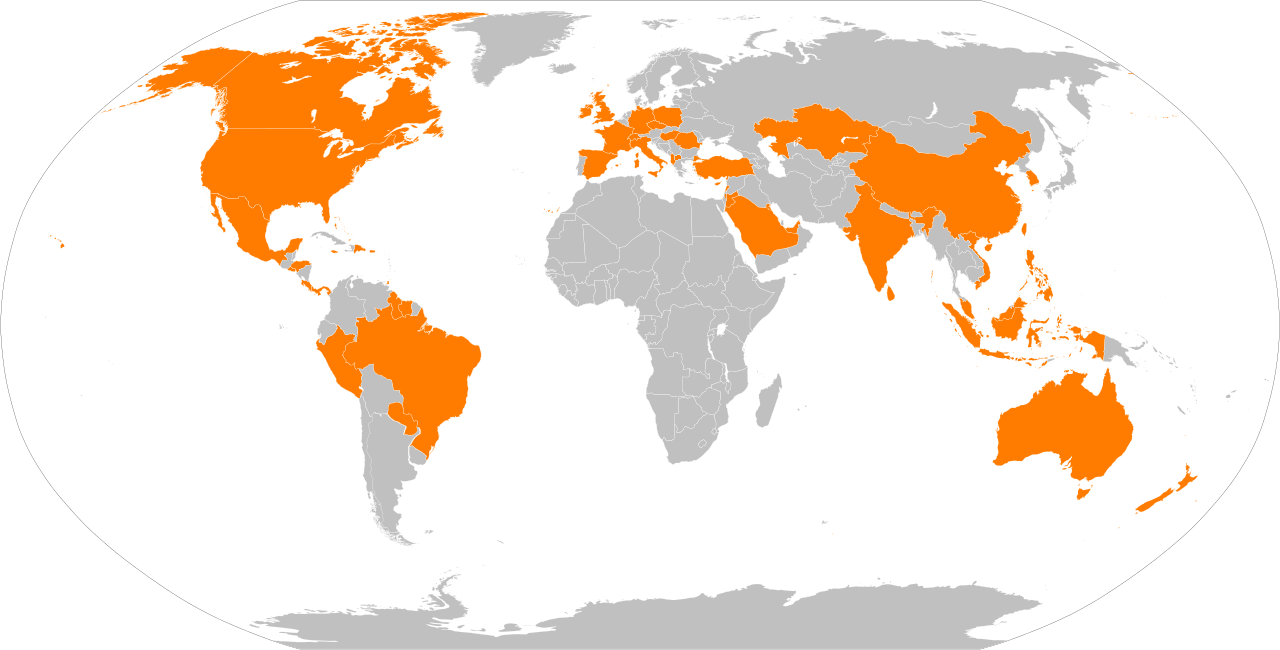
Map of countries with Popeyes restaurants as of June 2026

Some international franchises, such as the ones located in Germany and Japan, are located only on US military installations and are generally not accessible to the local civilian public.

Popeyes opened its first Canadian outlet in Toronto, Ontario, in 1984.

Popeyes arrived in the Philippines in 2001 but left in 2007 due to a problem with the franchisor; it later returned with a new deal with Kuya J Group in 2018 and opened its first branch in Pasig on May 19, 2019. Popeyes opened their first store in China on May 15, 2020, and in March 2021, it announced plans to open stores in Mexico and the United Kingdom, with the first restaurant in the latter country, locating at Westfield Stratford City opening on November 20, 2021. Restaurant Brands International signed a master franchise and development agreement with Indian company Jubilant FoodWorks on March 24, 2021, to operate Popeyes restaurants in India, Bangladesh, Nepal and Bhutan. The first Popeyes restaurant in South Asia opened in Bambalapitiya, Sri Lanka, on February 25, 2021.

In December 2020, Popeyes announced that it would be closing all locations in South Korea due to poor sales partially attributed to the COVID-19 pandemic. In October 2021, Popeyes signed an agreement with Romanian company Sterling Cruise to open 90 restaurants in Romania in the next 10 years; the first one opened on April 9, 2022. In January 2022, Popeyes signed an agreement with South Korean Tuna Supplier Shilla International to open again in South Korea; the first one opened in January 2023.

Popeyes opened its first store in Indonesia in 2000 under PT Popeyes Chicken Seafood Indonesia (later taken over by PT Popindo Selera Prima in 2002) and had opened its store in Jakarta, Bandung, Yogyakarta, Surabaya, Medan and Samarinda, but the last store in Puri Indah Mall, West Jakarta closed in 2011. Popeyes returned to Indonesia under PT Sari Chicken Indonesia, an affiliate of Mitra Adiperkasa and opened its first store in Skyline Building, Central Jakarta on December 23, 2022.

In August 2023, British private equity firm TDR Capital invested £50 million into Popeyes UK. In 2024, Popeyes announced that it would be opening stores in New Zealand and Taiwan later that year. It forced a small fish and chip shop called Popeye's Takeaways in Feilding, New Zealand, to change its name although the shop does not sell fried chicken. The first location in Paraguay was opened in December 2025. The first German location, which is accessible to the general public and is not located on a military base, opened on May 4th, 2026. It is located on the arrivals level of the Düsseldorf Airport. It is operated by Lagardère Travel Retail Deutschland.

Locations
Year	United States	Canada	Outside of the U.S. and Canada	Company-owned
2003	1,324	20	320	95
2004	1,382	28	347	67
2005	1,427	28	315	56
2006	1,459	31	306	50
2007	1,507	34	276	61
2008	1,527	39	301	55
2009	1,539	42	325	37
2010	1,533	42	333	37
2022	1,545	42	344	50

== Sustainability ==
In January 2023, Popeye's parent company, Restaurant Brands International, committed to sourcing 100% cage-free eggs by 2030.

== See also ==
- Cheryl Bachelder
- List of fast-food chicken restaurants
