= Michael G. Vann =

American historian (born 1967)

Michael G. Vann (born June 19, 1967) is an American historian who serves as Professor of History at California State University, Sacramento. He teaches a range of world history courses, including 20th century world, Southeast Asia, imperialism, and genocide. His research specializes in the history of the French colonial empire, epidemic diseases such as the Third Bubonic Plague Pandemic, and Cold War era mass violence in Southeast Asia. Vann holds a Ph.D. in History from the University of California, Santa Cruz, where he was a student of Tyler Stovall and Edmund Burke III. His dissertation was on the history of white supremacy in French colonial Hanoi. He is a graduate of 'Iolani School in Honolulu, Hawai'i, his home town.

== Accomplishments ==
Vann has won three Fulbright awards, one for doctoral research in France, 1994–1995, and a Senior Scholar award to Indonesia, 2012–2013, and a third as a Senior Scholar in Cambodia, 2018–2019, where he taught history and did research on representations of Cold War era mass violence in Cambodian, Vietnamese, and Indonesian museums. In Indonesia he was a visiting scholar for the History and American Studies departments at Universitas Gadjah Mada in Yogyakarta, Java.

He was president of the French Colonial Historical Society (FCHS) from 2008 to 2010. He is a member of a post-1999 wave of historians who adopted a new critical approach to this history of France and its colonial empire.

Vann has published three books: The Colonial Good Life: André Joyeux's Vision of French Indochina, 20th Century Voices: Selected Readings in World History, and The Great Hanoi Rat Hunt: Empire, Disease, and Modernity in French Colonial Vietnam. Vann was featured on public radio's Freakonomics, speaking about how his research on rat hunting in colonial Hanoi related to the economic concept "perverse incentive". He was interviewed about French colonialism on KUSP's 7th Avenue Project.

He has also published articles on Indonesian history and politics, including the Cebongan Prison raid, 2013, and Lawang Sewu, a Dutch era haunted house in Semarang.

== Publications ==
=== Books ===
The Great Hanoi Rat Hunt: Empire, Race, and Modernity in French Colonial Vietnam (Graphic History Series). Oxford University Press, New York, 2018. (Co-authored with Liz Clarke)

Instructor's Manual, Ways of the World: A Brief Global History with Sources. 3rd Edition. Bedford/St.Martin's, 2016. (Author)

The Norton Mix: Readings in World and Regional History. W.W. Norton, New York, 2016. (Co-Author and Co-Editor)

Twentieth Century Voices: Selected Readings in World History. Cognella, San Diego, 2012. (Author and Editor)

"The Colonial Good Life:" A Commentary on Andre Joyeux's Vision of French Indochina. White Lotus Press, Bangkok, 2008. (Author and Translator)

=== Film ===
"Cambodia's Other Lost City: French Colonial Phnom Penh". Writer and Host. 2014. Jeffrey Dym, director. YouTube

=== Edited volumes ===
"WHAB Focus Issue and Teaching Forum. Making French Connections: France in World History." Guest Editor with Alyssa Sepinwall. World History Association Bulletin Vol. XXVI, No. 1, 2010.

=== Articles, Book Chapters, and Pamphlets ===
"A People's History of Surfing" co-authored with Trey Highton. Jacobin, 2022. Jacobin

"Suharto's Old Guard Is Still Calling the Shots in Indonesia". Jacobin, 2022. Jacobin

"Suharto's US-Backed Coup in Indonesia Supplied a Template for Worldwide Mass Murder". Jacobin, 2022. Jacobin

"Tyler Stovall Was a Groundbreaking Historian of Modern France". Jacobin, 2021. Jacobin

"Indonesia Still Hasn't Escaped Suharto's Genocidal Legacy". Jacobin, 2021. Jacobin

"French Urbanism, Vietnamese Resistance, and the Plague in Hanoi, Vietnam, 1885-1930s", Edidted by Mohammad Gharipour and Caitlin DeClercq, Epidemic Urbanism: How Contagious Diseases Have Shaped Global Cities. Intellect Books, 2021.

"The True Story of Indonesia's US-Backed Anti-Communist Bloodbath". Jacobin, 2021. Jacobin

"Teaching Pandemic History During a Pandemic Present". Kyoto Review of Southeast Asia, special issue "Pandemic Pedagogy: Reflections on teaching in times of global disruption", 2021. Kyoto Review

"Alexandre Yersin: Plague Conqueror and White Colonizer". Fiction and Film for French Scholars, Volume 11, Issue 1, October 2020. Fiction and Film for Scholars of France

"Colonial Sewers Led to More Rats". Feral Atlas, Stanford University Press Digital, 2020. Feral Atlas

"Microsyllabus: Histories of Epidemic Disease". The Abusable Past, 2020. The Abusable Past

"'And not just the men, but the women and the children, too': Gendered Images of Violence in Indonesian, Vietnamese, and Cambodian Cold War Museums." Suvannabhumi: Multi-disciplinary Journal of Southeast Asian Studies, Volume 12, Number 1, 2020.

"Tropical Cold War Horror: Penumpasan Pengkhianatan G30S/PKI and the Traumatized Culture of Suharto's New Order." Poshek Fu and Man-Fung Yip, The Cold War and Asian Cinemas (Routledge), 2020.

"Murder, Museums, and Memory: Cold War Public History in Jakarta, Ho Chi Minh City, and Phnom Penh." Frank Jacob (ed.), Genocide and Mass Violence in Asia: An Introductory Reader (De Gruyter), 2019.

"Confessions of a Rogue Historian: Why I Wrote a Graphic History of Colonial Hanoi." Fiction and Film for French Scholars, Volume 9, Issue 3, March 2019. Fiction and Film for Scholars of France

"Book raids, Red-baiting and culture wars in the Indonesian presidential election." The Asia Dialogue, February 21, 2019. The Asia Dialogue

"Will French History Finally Engage Intersectionality?" in "Race, Racism, and the Study of France and the Francophone World Today." H-France Salon, Volume 11, Issue 2, 2019. H-France

"Suharto's Shadow Still Lingers in Indonesian Museums." The Diplomat, February 6, 2019. The Diplomat

"Emotion and ambiguity in the Tuol Sleng Genocide Museum," The Asia Dialogue, January 8, 2019. The Asia Dialogue

"Jakarta, 1968: The Party's Over." World History Bulletin special issue on "The Long Global Sixties," Vol. XXXIV, Nos. 1–2, 2018.

"(Colonial) Intimacy Issues: Using French Hanoi to Teach the Histories of Sex, Racial Hierarchies, and Geographies of Desire in the New Imperialism." World History Connected, October 2018. World History Connected

"American Historical Presidential Biography: Tyler Stovall." American Historical Association Presidential Address Booklet, 2018. American Historical Association

"Sex and the Colonial City: Mapping Masculinity, Whiteness, and Desire in French Occupied Hanoi." Journal of World History, Vol. 28, Nos. 3 & 4, 2017.

"'Blame it on the Casbah:' The White Male Imperialist Fantasies of Duvivier's Pépé le Moko." Fiction and Film for French Historians: A Cultural Bulletin, Vol. 8, Issue 1, 2017. Fiction and Film for Scholars of France

"Société colonial et accomodations: entre réalités et representations" co-authored with Jean-François Klein and Micheline Lessard in Dominique Barjot and Jean-François Klein. De l'Indochine colonial au Việt Nam actuel (Magellan & Cie.), 2017.

"Call Five-O a White Male Imperialist Fantasy: Steve McGarrett as a Vision of American Cold War Masculinity, Race, and Empire" in Lori McGuire (ed.), Entertainment Television and the Cold War, (Cambridge Scholars), 2016.

"Paris–Dakar in Reverse: Colonial and Post-Colonial Urban Histories, Roundtable Reflection on the Past and Future of French Urban History." Co-authored by Ellen Wurtzel, Jeff Horn, Catherine Clark, and Michael G. Vann, Proceedings of the Western Society for French History, 2016.

"Comparative History of Genocide in Southeast Asia: Using Cambodia and East Timor in Asian Civilizations and World History Survey Courses." Education About Asia, Vol. 20, No. 1, 2015.

"When the World Came to Southeast Asia: Malacca and the Global Economy." Education About Asia, Vol. 19, No. 2, 2014.

"Haunted house, haunted history: Visitors to Semarang's Lawang Sewu find competing narratives of history, memory and popular culture." Inside Indonesia, July 1, 2013. Inside Indonesia "Shadow Puppets and Special Forces: Indonesia's Fragile Democracy." The Diplomat, June 14, 2013. The Diplomat

"Hanoi in the Time of Cholera: Epidemic Disease and Racial Power in the Colonial City" in Laurence Monnais and Harold J. Cook (eds.), Global Movements, Local Concerns: Medicine and Health in Southeast Asia (National University Singapore Press), 2012.

"The Dark Side: French Men Becoming Monsters in Algeria." French and Film forFrench Historians: A Cultural Bulletin, Vol. 3, Issue 1, 2012. Fiction and Film for Scholars of France

"Fear and Loathing in French Hanoi: Colonial White Images and Imaginings of 'Native' Violence" in Martin Thomas (ed.) The French Colonial Mind: Violence, Military Encounters, and Colonialism (University of Nebraska Press), 2011.

"Teaching Colonialism in World History: The Case of French Indochina." World History Bulletin, Vol. XXVI, No. 1, 2010.

"Of Pirates, Postcards, and Public Beheadings: The Pedagogical Execution in French Colonial Indochina" in a special issue of Historical Reflections/Réflexions Historiques dedicated to colonial violence in the French empire, 2010.

"Placing East Timor on the Syllabus: Pedagogical Strategies for Teaching East Timor in University Level World History Survey Courses" in Michael Leach, Nuno Canas Mendes, Antero B. da Silva, Alarico da Costa Ximenes and Bob Boughto (eds.), Hatene kona ba/ Compreender/ Understanding/ Mengerti Timor-Leste (Swinburne Press), 2010.

"Caricaturing 'the colonial good life' in French Indochina." European Comic Art, Vol. 1, No. 2, 2009.

"Building Whiteness on the Red River: Race, Power, and Urbanism in Paul Doumer's Hanoi, 1897-1902" in a special issue of Historical Reflections/Réflexions Historiques dedicated to French colonial urbanism, 2007.

"White Blood on Rue Hue: The Murder of 'le négrier' Bazin." The Proceedings of the Western Society for French History Vol. 34, 2006.

"Of le Cafard and Other Tropical Diseases: Perceived Threats to White Colonial Culture in Indochina" in Jennifer Yee (ed.), France and 'Indochina:' Cultural Representations (Lexington), 2005.

"'All the World's a Stage', Especially in the Colonies: The Hanoi Exposition of 1902" in Martin Evans & Amanda Sackur (ed.), Empire and Culture: The French Experience, 1830-1940 (Macmillan/Palgrave Press), 2004.

"The Third Republic and Colonialism, 1870-1918." 2004.

"The Colonial Exhibition of May, 1931." 2004.

"Of Rats, Rice, and Race: The Great Hanoi Rat Massacre, an Episode in French Colonial History." French Colonial History, 2003.

"The Good, the Bad, and The Ugly: Variation and Difference in French Racial Thinking in Colonial Vietnam" in Tyler Stovall & Sue Peabody (ed.), The Color of Liberty: The History of Race in France (Duke University Press), 2003.

"The Colonial Casbah on the Silver Screen: Using Pépé le Moko and The Battle of Algiers to Teach Colonialism, Race, and Globalization in French History." Radical History Review, April 2002.

"The Good, the Bad, and The Ugly: Variation and Difference in French Racial Thinking in Colonial Indochine." Proceedings of the Western Society for French History, 1998. Winner of the Gargan Prize.

"Contesting Culture and Defying Dependency: Migration, Nationalism, and Identity in Late-Nineteenth-Century Hawaii." Stanford Humanities Review, Vol. 5, No. 2, 1997.

== Podcasting and Radio ==
=== New Books in History ===
Vann has been a host for New Books in History, a channel on the New Books Network, since 2019. His guests have ranged from Pulitzer Prize winner and MacArthur "Genius Grant" recipient Viet Thanh Nguyen to dirtbag left podcaster Matt Christman of Chapo Trap House.

New Books in History
Title	Author(s)/Guest(s)	Air Date	Link to Episode
The Skull of Alum Bheg: The Life and Death of a Rebel of 1857	Kim A. Wagner	October 7, 2019	New Books Network
Rubber and the Making of Vietnam: An Ecological History, 1897-1975	Michitake Aso	October 11, 2019	New Books Network
Footprints of War: Militarized Landscapes in Vietnam	David Biggs	October 31, 2019	New Books Network
Beyond the Asylum: Mental Illness in French Colonial Vietnam	Claire Edington	November 13, 2019	New Books Network
Vietnam's American War: A History	Pierre Asselin	November 18, 2019	New Books Network
Amritsar 1919: An Empire of Fear and the Making of a Massacre	Kim A. Wagner	January 15, 2020	New Books Network
My Lai: Vietnam, 1968, and the Descent into Darkness	Howard Jones	February 7, 2020	New Books Network
Nothing Ever Dies: Vietnam and the Memory of War	Viet Thanh Nguyen	May 28, 2020	New Books Network
Peace on Our Terms: The Global Battle for Women's Rights After the First World	Mona L. Siegel	June 15, 2020	New Books Network
Empire in Waves: A Political History of Surfing	Scott Laderman	June 19, 2020	New Books Network
Buried Histories: The Anticommunist Massacres of 1965-1966 in Indonesia	John Roosa	June 24, 2020	New Books Network
The Jakarta Method: Washington's Anticommunist Crusade & the Mass Murder Program that Shaped Our World	Vincent Bevins	July 1, 2020	New Books Network
Reconsidering Interpretation of Heritage Sites: America in the Eighteenth Century	Anne Lindsay	August 4, 2020	New Books Network
World History through Case Studies: Historical Skills in Practice	David Eaton	August 24, 2020	New Books Network
Subversive Seas: Anticolonial Networks across the Twentieth-Century Dutch Empire	Kris Alexanderson	September 14, 2020	New Books Network
Witness to the Age of Revolution: The Odyssey of Juan Bautista Tupac Amaru	Charles F. Walker	October 12	New Books Network
The 'Silent Majority' Speech: Richard Nixon, the Vietnam War, and the Origins of the New Right	Scott Laderman	October 22, 2020	New Books Network
The Murder of Emmett Till: A Graphic History	Karlos K. Hill	October 27, 2020	New Books Network
Cocaine and Surfing: A Sordid History of Surfing's Greatest Love Affair	Chas Smith	November 6, 2020	New Books Network
In the Dragon's Shadow: Southeast Asia in the Chinese Century	Sebastian Strangio	November 23, 2020	New Books Network
Asian Place, Filipino Nation: A Global History of the Philippine Revolution, 1887-1912	Nicole CuUnjieng Aboitiz	December 9, 2020	New Books Network
Thai Stick: Surfers, Scammers, and the Untold Story of the Marijuana Trade	Peter Maguire and Mike Ritter	December 23, 2020	New Books Network
The Chapo Guide to Revolution: A Manifesto Against Logic, Facts, and Reason	Matt Christman, et al.	December 24, 2020	New Books Network
Albert Camus: A Very Short Introduction	Oliver Gloag	January 13, 2021	New Books Network
Feral Atlas: The More-than-Human Anthropocene	Anna L. Tsing	January 22, 2021	New Books Network
Coup, King, Crisis: A Critical Interregnum in Thailand	Pavin Chachavalpongpun	January 27, 2021	New Books Network
You Don't Belong Here: How Three Women Rewrote the Story of War	Elizabeth Becker	March 10, 2021	New Books Network
Epidemics and the Modern World	Michell L. Hammond	March 27, 2021	New Books Network
Sulfuric Utopias: A History of Maritime Fumigation	Lukas Engelmann and Christos Lynteris	March 26, 2021	New Books Network
Monumental: Oscar Dunn and His Radical Fight in Reconstruction Louisiana	Brian K. Mitchell, Barrington S. Edwards, and Nick Weldon	April 12, 2021	New Books Network
Lenin Lives!: Reimagining the Russian Revolution 1917-2017	Philip Cunliffe	April 22, 2021	New Books Network
The Committed	Viet Thanh Nguyen	April 29, 2021	New Books Network
Political Violence in Southeast Asia Since 1945: Case Studies from Six Countries	Eve Monique Zucker and Ben Kiernan	June 29, 2021	New Books Network
Republicanism, Communism, Islam: Cosmopolitan Origins of Revolution in Southeast Asia	John Sidel	July 13, 2021	New Books Network
Slave Revolt on Screen: The Haitian Revolution in Film and Video Games	Alyssa Goldstein Sepinwall	July 22, 2021	New Books Network
Making Waves	Buzzy Kerbox	August 11, 2021	New Books Network
Militarizing Marriage: West African Soldiers' Conjugal Traditions in Modern French Empire	Sarah J. Zimmerman	August 20, 2021	New Books Network
The End of the End of History: Politics in the Twenty-First Century	Alex Hochuli, George Hoare, and Philip Cunliffe	September 3, 2021	New Books Network
Working Class History: Everyday Acts of Resistance & Rebellion	Working Class History Collective	October 8, 2021	New Books Network
Imperial Nostalgia: How the British Conquered Themselves	Peter Mitchell	October 14, 2021	New Books Network
The Cinema of Rithy Panh: Everything Has a Soul	Leslie Barnes and Joseph Mai	October 15, 2021	New Books Network
Prophet Against Slavery: Benjamin Lay, A Graphic Novel	David Lester with Marcus Rediker and Paul Buhle	November 10, 2021	New Books Network
On Tyranny Graphic Edition: Twenty Lessons from the Twentieth Century	Timothy Snyder	November 16, 2021	New Books Network
Hinge Points; A Podcast about Historical Contingency	Matt Christman and Daniel Bessner	November 23, 2021	New Books Network
Citizen Cash: The Political Life and Times of Johnny Cash	Michael Stewart Foley	February 2, 2022	New Books Network
One Man's Terrorist: The Political History of the IRA	Daniel Finn	February 10, 2022	New Books Network
Breathe: A Life in Flow	Rickson Gracie and Peter Maguire	March 24, 2022	New Books Network
World War II in Southeast Asia: Economy and Society under Japanese Occupation	Gregg Huff	April 15, 2022	New Books Network
Vaccine: The Human Story; A Chat with Historian and Podcaster Anne Kelly	Anne Kelly	July 8, 2022	New Books Network
Debating the Woman Question in the French Third Republic, 1870-1920	Karen Offen	July 14, 2022	New Books Network
The Memory of Colonialism in Britain and France: The Sins of Silence	Itay Lotem	August 5, 2022	New Books Network
Feminism's Empire	Carolyn L. Eichner	August 10, 2022	New Books Network
Road to Nowhere: What Silicon Valley Gets Wrong about the Future of Transportation	Paris Marx	August 16, 2022	New Books Network
Armed Citizens: The Road from Ancient Rome to the Second Amendment	Noah Shusterman	September 30, 2022	New Books Network
Ghost Stories for the End of the World; A History Podcast about Conspiracies	Matt	October 10, 2022	New Books Network
Escaping Slavery: A Documentary History of Native American Runaways in British North America	Antonio T. Bly	November 21, 2022	New Books Network
"The Galactic Vietnam: Technology, Modernization, and Empire in George Lucas's Star Wars"	Daniel Immerwahr	December 10, 2022	New Books Network
Postcolonialism and Migration in French Comics	Mark McKinney	December 24, 2022	New Books Network

=== Guest appearances ===
Vann has also been interviewed on many programs regarding his work.

Guest Appearances
Title	Program	Date	Link to Interview
"His Academic Excellency Paul Kagame at Sacramento State University?"	KPFA Weekend News	2011	
"Episode 9: Perverse Incentives"	The Invisible Hand with Matthew Lazin-Rydaer, Canadian Broadcasting Corporation	2012	
"Our Man in Hanoi: Historian Mike Vann"	The 7th Avenue Project: Thinking Persons' Radio, KUSP	2012	7th Avenue Project
"The Cobra Effect"	Freakonomics Radio, National Public Radio	2012	Freakonomics
"Traveling to Vietnam: What Changed?"	Chopsticks Alley	2017	Chopsticks Alley
"The Great Hanoi Rat Massacre of 1902 Did Not Go as Planned"	Atlas Obscura	2017	Atlas Obscura
"The Great Hanoi Rat Hunt – Bringing SEAsian History to Life"	ThinkTech Hawaii	2017	ThinkTech Hawaii
"French Rats in Hanoi: The Effects of French Colonial Rule in Vietnam"	Chopsticks Alley	2017	Chopsticks Alley
"Paranoia di Balik Pembatasan Akses WNA ke Museum TNI" ("The Paranoia Behind Restricting Foreigners' Access to the TNI Museum")	Tirto.ID	2018	Tirto.ID
"Gendering Narratives of Cold War Violence in Indonesian, Vietnamese, and Cambodian Museums with Michael Vann"	Southeast Asian Crossroads, Center for Southeast Asia Studies, Northern Illinois University	2018	SoundCloud
"Interview with Michael G. Vann, Professor of History, Sacramento State University, author of the new graphic history, The Great Hanoi Rat Hunt: Empire, Disease, and Modernity in French Colonial Vietnam"	World History Connected	2018	World History Connected
"Episode 42: The Great Hanoi Rat Hunt"	On Top of the World	2018	On Top of the World
"The Great Hanoi Rat Hunt with Michael G. Vann"	Southeast Asian Crossroads, Center for Southeast Asia Studies, Northern Illinois University	2018	SoundCloud
"Author Michael Vann on Hanoi's Infamous Colonial Rat Hunt"	Urbanist Hanoi	2019	Saigoneer
"The Great Hanoi Rat Hunt"	New Books in French Studies	2019	New Books Network
"The Great Hanoi Rat Hunt: The mass murder of rats that rocked colonial Hanoi"	Chào Hanoi	2020	Chào Hanoi
"What a Failed Rat Hunt Says about Colonialism"	Constant Wonder, BYU Radio	2020	BYU Radio
"The Great Hanoi Rat Hunt: A Conversation with Michael G. Vann"	Made in China Journal	2020	Made in China Journal
"Rats: the planet's most tenacious survivors with a lot to teach humanity"	Ideas: Radio for the Mind, Canadian Broadcasting Corporation	2020	CBC
"Great Hanoi Rat Hunt with Michael Vann"	Infectious Historians	2020	Infectious Historians

== Athletic achievements ==
Hailing from O'ahu, Hawai'i, Vann is an accomplished surfer who frequently travels to Indonesia. He holds a 4th degree black belt in Brazilian Jiu Jitsu. He has taught Brazilian Jiu Jitsu in Santa Cruz, California for Claudio França BJJ, Kaijin MMA, and Garth Taylor Jiu-Jitsu. He also taught Brazilian Jiu Jitsu at Hanoi BJJ in Vietnam and Kingdom Fight Gym in Siem Reap, Cambodia.
