= Great Hanoi Rat Massacre =

Pest control campaign in Hanoi, French Indochina

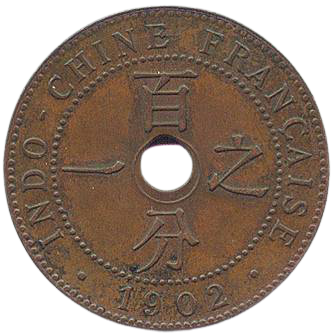
- A French Indochinese 1 cent coin from 1902, which was offered as a reward per rat's tail.
- Native name: Cuộc đại thảm sát chuột ở Hà Nội (局大慘殺𤝞於河內); Grand massacre des rats de Hanoï
- Date: 1902 (Thành Thái 14 / 成泰十四年) (Note: Reign era date used in the Vietnamese Imperial calendar.)
- Location: Hanoi, Tonkin, French Indochina (present day Hanoi, Vietnam)
- Also known as: The Great Hanoi Rat Hunt
- Type: Rat extermination campaign
- Cause: Third plague pandemic, expansion of the Hanoian rat population due to the expansion of Hanoi's French Quarter.
- Motive: To prevent a potential outbreak of the Bubonic Plague caused by the Yersinia pestis bacteria.
- Target: Rats
- Participants: Government-General of French Indochina, professional rat-catching services, and vigilante rat hunters
- Outcome: Bounty programme cancelled, other anti-pandemic measures taken.
- Casualties: Hundreds of thousands of rats (reported between April and June 1902); Unknown number of rats afterwards.
- Awards: 1 cent per rat's tail

The Great Hanoi Rat Massacre (Vietnamese: Đại thảm sát chuột ở Hà Nội; chữ Nôm: 大慘殺𤝞於河內; French: Massacre des rats de Hanoï) occurred in 1902, in Hanoi, Tonkin, French Indochina (present day Hanoi, Vietnam), when the French government authorities attempted to control the rat population of the city by hunting them down. As they felt that they were making insufficient progress, and due to labour strikes, they created a bounty programme that paid a reward of 1¢ for each rat killed. To collect the bounty, people would need to provide the severed tail of a rat. Colonial officials, however, began noticing rats in Hanoi with no tails. The Vietnamese rat catchers would capture rats, sever their tails, then release them back into the sewers so that they could produce more rats.

The Great Hanoi Rat Massacre happened in the middle of a global plague pandemic only a few years after Swiss-French physician and bacteriologist Alexandre Yersin linked the spread of the pandemic to rodents.

Today, the events are often used as an example of a perverse incentive, commonly referred to as the cobra effect. The modern discoverer of this event, American historian Michael G. Vann argues that the cobra example from the British Raj cannot be proven, but that the rats in the Vietnam case can be proven, so the term should be changed to the Rat Effect.

== Background ==
=== French plans for Hanoi ===
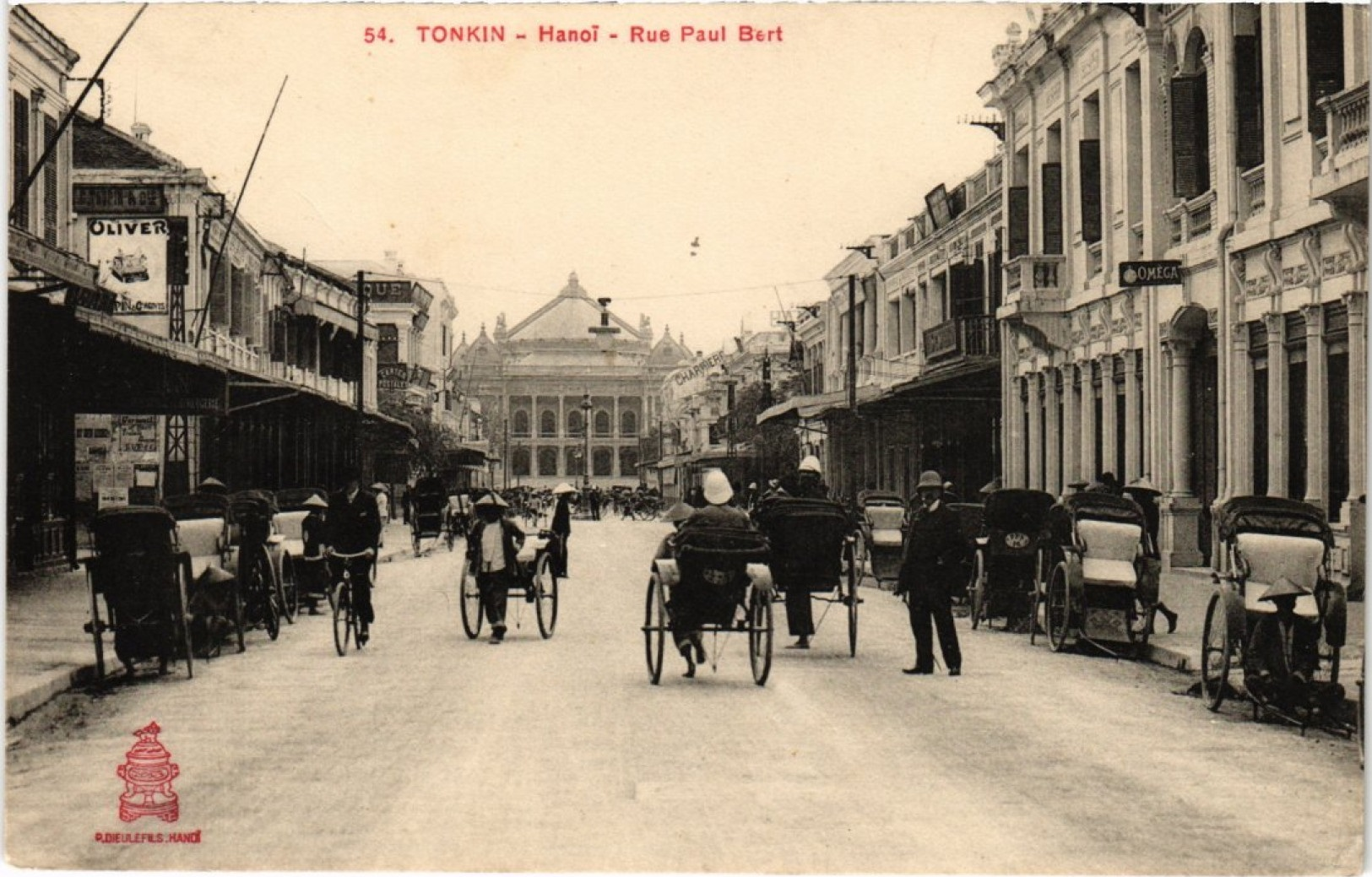
Paul Bert street (now Tràng Tiền Street), an example of the French renovation of Hanoi.

France formally assumed control of Hanoi in 1882, occupying the city after the failure of the Treaty of Saigon. However, the region of Tonkin was not fully pacified until as late as 1896. The French colonised Eastern Indochina (present day Vietnam, Cambodia, and Laos) in several stages to gain backdoor access to the wealth of China through its market, specifically the French sought a river route to the Chinese province of Yunnan, which at the time was imagined as "El Dorado with silk instead of gold".

Prior to the establishment of the French protectorate of Tonkin, the city of Hanoi was a collection of 36 streets, each of these streets was devoted to a specific craft as well as several temples and pagodas spread around the settlement. Furthermore, the city of Hanoi also possessed a citadel and fort, these were ironically constructed in 1803 (the year after the Nguyễn dynasty was established by the Gia Long Emperor) with the assistance of French military engineers that were trained in the Vauban tradition of fortification. However, the French viewed Hanoi as a dirty, squalid, ramshackle collection of villages. So they sought to transform it into a French-style city worthy of being the seat of one of the colonial possessions of the French Empire. This process began with the arrival of French administrators in the 1880s, namely Paul Bert in 1886, and set off the Gallicisation of the city. Large areas of Hanoi, including most of the old citadel as well many temples, were demolished to make way for the new French-style buildings that would become the core of the new city. Most notable among these new constructions were St. Joseph's Cathedral and the Lanessan Hospital.

In 1897, Paul Doumer had been appointed Governor-General of French Indochina after he was briefly the French Minister of Finance (1895–1896) when he tried without success to introduce an income tax. Under his leadership, the old Hanoi would be transformed into a completely different city and the transformation went into overdrive. As Doumer planned on making Hanoi the new capital of the Union of Indochina he insisted that it should also look the part. To fulfil this plan, a new palace for the residence of the Governor-General of French Indochina was constructed (which serves today as Vietnam's Presidential Palace). Large parts of Hanoi were cleared to make room for the new French-style inner city that was filled with broad tree-lined boulevards, colonial-style villas, and well-tended gardens. This new area would be known as the "French Quarter" (Quartier Européen / Khu phố Pháp, today's Ba Đình District), as some visitors would describe it as "a slice of Paris on the other side of the world". This area of the city sharply contrasted the cramped, narrow, and chaotic "Native Quarter" (Quartier indigène), where both the indigenous Annamese people and Han Chinese people resided.

In the year 1902, the capital city of French Indochina was moved from Saigon, Cochinchina (present day Ho Chi Minh City) to Hanoi, Tonkin and it remained so until 1945. When Paul Doumer arrived in Hanoi, he launched several major infrastructure projects, such as the Paul Doumer Bridge (now called the Long Biên Bridge), which spanned the 1,700-meter (5,600 ft) width of the Red River, and the Grand Palais d’Expositions which built for the Hanoi Exhibition in 1903. These actions were enacted to make Hanoi a showcase for France's civilising mission in Indochina and to provide the city with the very first electricity network in Asia.

=== French public health mission and the sewage system ===
Among the large projects, ordered by Paul Doumer, was the construction of a massive underground sewage system that would serve both as a symbol of French modernity and keep the "French Quarter" clear of any human waste. As toilets were seen as "a sign of civilisation" Doumer wanted there to be flushable toilets in every French palace. By the time of Paul Doumer's departure in March 1902, over 19 kilometers of sewers had been built underneath Hanoi, the largest concentration of which lay beneath the "French Quarter". A smaller section of the sewage system also lay underneath the "Indigenous Quarter" of the city. The new sewer system did help fight Cholera, a disease brought to Hanoi by the French expeditionary forces coming from Algeria.

This large new sewage system also brought with it a new unforeseen problem from the French, rats. In the sewers, rats found no natural predators and if they would get hungry they could easily penetrate directly into the most luxurious apartments in the city through the "highway" hidden deep beneath human footsteps. This caused major concerns for the French both for hygienic reasons and an outbreak of the Bubonic Plague (or the "Black Death"). Just a few years earlier in 1894, the famous Alexandre Yersin discovered the Yersinia pestis bacteria that caused the disease and his colleague Paul-Louis Simond linked it to fleas found on rodents. Because of the new knowledge about how rats caused the Bubonic Plague, the French colonists became very concerned with the situation and quickly wanted to remedy it.

"If industrialisation changed the world for human beings, it also created new opportunities for their furry neighbours. Expanding cities and long-distance trade networks offered rats new habitats and new ways to travel distances far greater than they could with just their stubby little legs. As with humans, these technological changes resulted in a demographic explosion. I'm not sure if we breed like rats or they breed like people. It is impossible to know the exact rat population, but scientific estimates indicate that these rodents currently outnumber human beings by several billion. I find it fascinating that as humans went through an unprecedented population boom from 1800 to the present, rats, which most people consider a pest, increased in number as a direct consequence of human actions."

— Michael G. Vann at "The Great Hanoi Rat Hunt: A Conversation with Michael G. Vann" (20 August 2020) - The Made in China Journal.

=== Contemporary pandemic ===
The third plague pandemic started in 1855 in Yunnan, China during the Qing dynasty period. This episode of bubonic plague spread to all inhabited continents, and ultimately led to more than 12 million deaths in India and China (and perhaps over 15 million worldwide), with at least 10 million killed in India alone, making it one of the deadliest pandemics in history.

In 1898 Paul-Louis Simond was in the city of Karachi, Sind, India where, despite limited resources, he was able to demonstrate that fleas transmit the bacterium Yersinia pestis, the agent causing bubonic plague, from rat to rat, and from rat to human.

The third plague pandemic happened at the same time as the French renovation of Hanoi. From Yunnan it spread to Guangzhou and then to Hong Kong. The Bubonic plague then spread from Hong Kong to the British Raj. The United States military brought it to Manila during their invasion of the Philippines at the Asian theatre of the Spanish–American War. In 1899 it struck the Republic of Hawaii, where in Honolulu (its capital city) the authorities chose to burn down its Chinatown. Before the Bubonic plague hit the American city of San Francisco its municipal authorities decided to enact a quarantine policy for its Chinatown. During the quarantine the municipal authorities discussed enacting a "Honolulu Solution" to prevent the disease from affecting the rest of the city.

The global situation became serious for Hanoi when French residents reported an infestation of rats in the French Quarter. It seems that brown rats in Hanoi arrived on ships and trains that came from China where the pandemic started. This invasive species of rats quickly discovered that the new sewers were an ideal ecosystem and rapidly took over Hanoi's urban infrastructure, with reports coming out that people had spotted rats climbing up the outflow pipes and later even out of the toilets in French houses. The realisation that these might be plague-carrying rats created a panic among health officials leading to their response to attempt to eradicate the rat infestation before the city would succumb to the pandemic.

== Social environment and French government policy at the time ==
The demand for silk waned as the French completed their railway between Kunming, Yunnan and Hanoi, but this opened up a new market for opium. Yunnan was a major producer of opium and the French wanted to use the line of Yunnan to Haiphong to supply the French Concession in Shanghai. Paul Doumer turned French Indochina into a narco-state and uplifted French Indochina's revenue from being consistently making losses to being profitable. This also made the colony economically interdependent with the Chinese Empire. This turned Chinese goods, Chinese merchants, and Chinese labourers into "the life blood" of the Union of Indochina. Because of the colony's dependence on the Chinese market, French colonists commonly claimed that neither they nor the natives were in charge of it as the Chinese effectively controlled it, while others referred to the Chinese negatively as "the Jews of Asia".

During Napoleon III's Second Empire, France was an authoritarian technocratic state, but after the Second Empire fell, the new Third Republic embraced Progressivism and the technocrats who had a free rein during the Empire were frustrated by the new democratic constraints placed upon them. Many of these technocrats were drawn by French colonial empire, where they could engage in widespread social experiments without the fear of opposition or negative public opinion as they could use the military to enforce their policies. In Hanoi, this translated to a complete renewal of the city based on French modernity.

The French Quartier Européen was located right next to the old 36 streets of Hanoi, in the perspective of the French, the 36 streets were an old and dirty place. The Native Quarter had many lakes and ponds, the roads were mostly dirt roads, when it rained it became muddy, and the houses were shabby with mostly thatched roofs. By contrast, the Quartier Européen area had wide roads, green trees, and white spacious villas. Roughly 90% of the population of Hanoi lived in the Old Quarter which made up only a third of its surface area, while the Quartier Européen and an administrative and military district to the west held only 10% of the city's population and made up the other two-thirds of the city. This resulted in Hanoi being an examplar "colonial dual city" where the colonial elites enjoyed spacious luxurious lifestyles compared to the colonised natives who were all cramped into pre-colonial slums.

During the early period of French rule in the Union of Indochina, colonial officials knew almost nothing about the tropical diseases they would encounter. When epidemics of smallpox, diarrhea, dengue fever, syphilis, etc. would break out, they could do nothing but erect barriers between them and the natives. The French regarded their colonial empire as a Mission Civilisatrice and justified the urban renovations of Hanoi as an act to "combat disease".

During the 1890s, Hanoi was being equipped with modern sewers using the latest technology and the city received its own freshwater system, access to these resources was quite strictly divided between racial lines as the system only served the White parts of town while very little Asians actually having access to the benefits of the city's new urban infrastructure. While the newly built French-style villas contained both running water systems and modern flush toilets, most of the Vietnamese and Chinese residents of the city who resided in the Old Quarter had to collect water from public fountains. The human waste, commonly found in these public fountains, was removed by pre-dawn night-soil collectors. Rather than having any proper sewers, the Old Quarter only contained gutter drains.

On 8 January 1902, Yersin was accredited to be the first headmaster of Indochina Medical College by the governor-general of French Indochina, future president of France, Paul Doumer. Yersin, as well as a number of other medical experts in Hanoi, was concerned about the bubonic plague arriving there from southern China on the newly established steamship lines.

As the source of the plague was in Yunnan, the French vilified China and Chinese people.

== First attempts to control the rat population ==
During the beginning of the campaign in April 1902, the Government-General of French Indochina hired professional Vietnamese rat-catchers, these would descend into the sewers to hunt the rats down, and be paid for each rat that they had eliminated.

"One had to enter the dark and cramped sewer system, make one’s way through human waste in various forms of decay, and hunt down a relatively fierce wild animal which could be carrying fleas with the bubonic plague or other contagious diseases. This is not even to mention the probable existence of numerous other dangerous animals, such as snakes, spiders, and other creatures, that make this author’s skin crawl with anxiety."

— Michael G. Vann at "The Cobra Effect: A New Freakonomics Radio Podcast".

In the last week of April, it was reported that the rat-catchers had killed 7,985 rats, in early May, they started gaining more experience and the death toll was higher than 4,000 rats a day. By the end of May, the numbers were even higher. On 30 May alone, they reported having killed 15,041 rats. In June, daily kill counts topped 10,000, and on June 21, they reported having killed as many as 20,112 rats in a single day. The success of these professional rat-catchers immediately caused a reduction of deaths caused by diseases carried by the rodents. Despite the high number of rats killed being reported, the French realised that the professional pest control services weren't making a dent in the rat population as the rats could quickly reproduce, so they sought alternative measures to try and reduce the rat population in the city.

The people hired to hunt the rats in the sewers began getting displeased with their situation. They saw their complex and dangerous working environment surrounded by all kinds of waste, human excrement, uncleanliness, and having to deal with dangerous animals like snakes and centipedes, while they were paid very little for their work relative to the effort they invested. In July 1902, Dr. Serez reported to his superiors that he was having problems with the locals during the rat eradication campaign, as they started to go on strike demanding to have their wages increased. The VNEconomics Academy of Blockchain and Cryptocurrencies reports that Professor Nguyễn Văn Tuấn claimed that by 1904, the authorities increased the commission for every rat killed to 4 cents. Nguyễn Văn Tuấn further noted that during the campaign a total of 55,000,000 rats were reported as being killed.

While the French colonial empire saw itself as a modern technocratic administration and administered its colonies based on rigid record-keeping and statistics as well as a vast collection of data, the data collected by the technocrats was often unreliable. All data collected by the French such as the city's population figures, the number of plague cases to the daily count of dead rats were just best guesses. The number of reported rats killed likely did not reflect the actual number of rats that were killed.

As the Quartier Européen was usually seen as the "civilised part of Hanoi" with its clean neighbourhoods, this hunt had also had perceived negative social effects for its residents. According to a report from the Resident-Superior of Tonkin on June 9 to the Government-General of French Indochina, the French population kept running into indigenous rat-catchers arising from the Quartier Européen's numerous manhole covers completely covered in filth and carrying hundreds of bloody dead rats and a foul odour, which caused many of them to complain about these activities.

== Hiring vigilantes and the unintended consequences ==
As the French authorities found that the extermination process wasn't going fast enough they proceeded to Plan B, offering any enterprising local the opportunity to get in on the hunt for rats. To incentivise this, the French set a bounty of 1 cent per rat. To not be overrun with rat corpses, the civilians only had to submit a rat's tail to the municipal offices. The French thought that this was a good idea because they had a policy of trying to encourage entrepreneurialism in Vietnam. Initially, the new plan appeared to be working as devised as large numbers of tails were being brought in. But then an unintended consequence emerged. The enterprising Vietnamese that were hired to kill the rats soon realised that killing a rat would only make future rewards less likely. After all, they needed the rats to breed more rats with tails as these would become a future source of income.

The French soon started noticing living and healthy rats running around without their tails. The rat hunters amputated their tails and then let them escape so they could breed and create more offspring with tails to then repeat the process. Furthermore, there were also reports that some Vietnamese people were deliberately smuggling in rats from outside Hanoi into the city. The final straw for this plan was when French health inspectors discovered rat farming operations popping up in the countryside on the outskirts of Hanoi, that were breeding rats solely for their tails as some sort of "tail creation factories".

As the French policies had failed to accomplish its objectives, in fact having made the rat problem even worse in Hanoi, they cancelled the bounty programme.

== Aftermath ==
After the failed campaign ended, the rats, now more numerous than ever, continued frolicking underneath the city and the French had resigned to have to live with them.

Former governor-general Paul Doumer wanted to organise the Hanoi Exhibition (an international colonial exposition) as an occasion to flaunt the city of Hanoi as a civilised and sanitary area, presenting it as a victory of the French government. The Hanoi Exhibition ran from 1902 until 1903 and during its time many goods and cargo from all over the world poured into Hanoi, this added to Hanoi's burden of disease because foreign rats brought pathogenic germs along with the cargo. By 1903, the Bubonic plague had infected 159 people; Of these, 110 died. Most of the victims were native Vietnamese people, while only 6 French colonists were infected, of which 2 died. Among the reasons why the death toll was higher among the Vietnamese was because they kept their sick family members a secret out of a fear that if the authorities found out about them that they would come to check and interfere.

The Bubonic plague continued to spread for the coming years. In the year 1906, an outbreak in Tonkin negatively affected the Tonkinese economy. Due to the economic downturn caused by the pandemic, a lot of people from the Tonkinese countryside fled to Hanoi, where many migrants became homeless beggars. Between the years 1906 and 1908, French health officials officially recorded 263 deaths from the Bubonic plague. As a result, the authorities decided to take other anti-pandemic measures and stricter hygiene control in the 36 streets of the "Native Quarter". The French authorities realised that they could only contain the pandemic through very intense and often invasive public health measures designed to stop it from spreading further once it has been identified. These measures included quarantining the sick in lazarettes, burning the belongings and often the homes of those who were found to be infected, and seizing corpses. These stricter measures were successful in reducing the further spread of the pandemic within the city. The French continued to enforce these measures after the pandemic as the natives didn't have the personal hygiene habits that the French desired them to acquire. This reflected the racial politics of the time, as similar attitudes existed in places like South Africa, India, the United States, and Hong Kong. However, these measures weren't very popular and angered the local population.

In 1998, the Vietnamese authorities closed restaurants selling cat meat, which was marketed as "little tiger (tiểu hổ) meat", because they thought that if the cat population decreased, rats would invade the rice fields, showcasing a similar mentality to the French almost a century earlier.

== Scholarship and works about the event ==
=== Of Rats, Rice, and Race: The Great Hanoi Rat Massacre, an Episode in French Colonial History ===
In 1995, American historian Michael G. Vann was researching for his doctoral dissertation on the city of Hanoi during French protectorate period in the overseas archives (Centre des Archives Section d'Outre-Mer) in Aix-en-Provence, Bouches-du-Rhône. During his research there he stumbled across one of the more bizarre primary sources that a historian is ever likely to find. Buried deep within the overseas archives, Vann found a folder that labelled "Destruction of Hazardous Animals: Rats" concerning pest control. The archived file was a haphazard collection of records from the French government of Indochina detailing the number of rats that were killed on each day and the amount of money that the French had awarded to the rat hunters. The archives included about a hundred of identical forms that would list the number of rats that were reportedly killed between April 1902 and July 1902 in the first and second arrondissements (districts) of Hanoi. Vann noted that while the dossiers recorded hundreds of thousands of rats being killed the numbers inexplicably started to decline, with first a few thousand, then a few hundred, and then only a few dozen before reporting no rat deaths at all on the last page. Vann stated that there was no indication what caused the decline in reported rat deaths anywhere in the dossier.

Michael G. Vann would continue to search for more information in the Centre des Archives Section d’Outre-Mer in Aix-en-Provence and various collections in Paris.

In the year 1997, Michael G. Vann went to Vietnam to do archival research on the rat massacre for more information on the topic. While researching the archives, he attempted to reach into the top drawer of a card catalogue that was dedicated to pre-1954 French-language files, and then suddenly felt the sensation of a rat walking over his hand.

Vann originally published Of Rats, Rice, and Race: The Great Hanoi Rat Massacre, an Episode in French Colonial History in a journal in 2003. For years he assumed that only "a few dozen colleagues read the piece and kind of forgot about it" until he was approached by the producers of a podcast show called Freakonomics Radio through a phone call that took place in 2012. The producers of Freakonomics Radio asked Vann if he would attend the podcast to illustrate the economic principle of perverse incentives, a concept he was unfamiliar with at the time. After the interview he learned that his article on the Great Hanoi Rat Massacre was being cited by a substantial number of economists and business journalists.

=== The Great Hanoi Rat Hunt: Empire, Disease, and Modernity in French Colonial Vietnam ===
In 2018, Michael G. Vann and comic book artist Liz Clarke published the book The Great Hanoi Rat Hunt: Empire, Disease, and Modernity in French Colonial Vietnam (Vietnamese: Cuộc đại thảm sát chuột tại Hà Nội: Đế chế, Dịch bệnh và Sự Hiện đại ở VN thời Pháp thuộc) through the Oxford University Press. The book is a hybrid scholarly volume and graphic novel (long-form comic book). While the bulk of the information contained within the book is the form of an academic work authored by Vann, there are hundreds of pages in comic book format, which were drawn up by Clarke.

In an interview with PV Thanh Niên, Vann said "This book is like a love letter I want to send to Hanoi" (Cuốn sách này cũng giống như bức thư tình tôi muốn gửi tới Hà Nội) talking about the hospitality that he received when he visited the city back in 1997. Among his motivations for writing the book, he noted that it was a part of his mission is to let Americans know more about the country of city Vietnam, to educate them more about the history of this country with "thousands of years of civilisation", rather than only knowing about it through the Vietnam War. Ivan Franceschini of the Made in China Journal describes the work as being a praiseworthy case study in the history of imperialism, noting that the book delves deep into the racialised economic inequalities of empire. Franceschini further notes that it explores the idea of colonisation as a form of modernisation, while also discussing the creation of a radical power differential between "the West and the rest" created by industrial capitalism.

Vann describes his choice to make half the book in comic book format as way to reach a larger audience as he noted "that Oxford had this series that takes unusual and quirky historical research and puts it into comic form" and he found the Great Hanoi Rat Massacre to also be a "quirky story". Furthermore, Michael G. Vann felt that the topics discussed in the book would be presented in a better way if they were in an illustrated format as he wanted to visually showcase the differences between the Vietnamese and French neighbourhoods of Hanoi.

For researching the topic, Vann went on multiple trips to Hanoi between 1997 and 2014.

Michael G. Vann says that the rats themselves are one of the main characters in his book, describing them as the "totem animal of modernity". While he took inspiration from Art Spiegelman's Maus for the rats, he refused to anthropomorphise them.

Vann also included themes in the book about racism (including sinophobia) and after learning that Dr. Sun Yat-Sen resided in Hanoi during the time of these events he included him in the book, both because he wanted to illustrate sinophobia and because he was also a graduate of the ʻIolani School in Honolulu.

=== Use of the Events in Literature ===
In 2025, a collection of stories was published that included a story, Year of the Cat, with the rats and 1903 plague in Hanoi as a major plot element.

== Sources ==
- Logan, William Stewart. Hanoi, Biography of a City, Seattle, Washington: University of Washington Press, 2000.
- Vann, Michael G.: The Great Hanoi Rat Hunt: Empire, Disease And Modernity In French Colonial Vietnam, Oxford University Press, 2018.
