= Day-old chick =

Filipino fried chicken hatchling

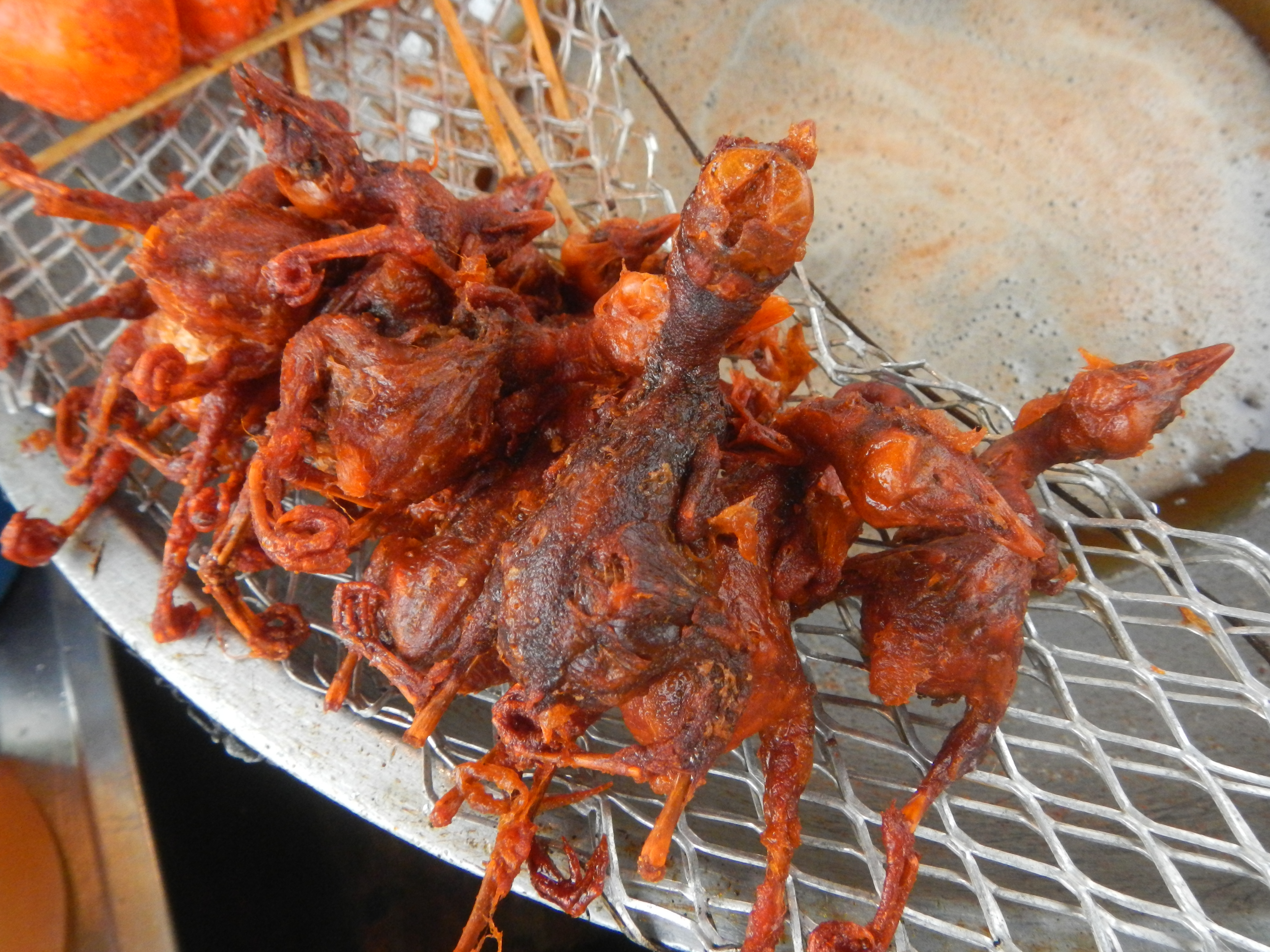
Day-old chicks sold in Baliwag, Bulacan

The day-old chick (also Super-Chick or Day-0) is a fried chicken hatchling in Filipino cuisine. Typically made from male chicks procured from chick culling at poultry farms, day-old chicks are eaten both as a part of Filipino street food and as pulutan bar snacks.

== Production and consumption ==
The chick is typically fried: the batter is comparable to that of camaron rebosado deep-fried shrimp. The batter is often dyed orange for aesthetics. The fried chick is served on a skewer or a line of toothpicks. The bones and beak of the day-old chick are soft enough to eat, though crunchy; a given day-old chick is typically eaten head-first, then the rest of the body in course, consuming the entirety of the chick. They are eaten as finger food (pulutan), on skewers (tusok-tusok), and with rice as a light meal (ulam). They are served with sawsawan or agre dulce dipping sauces; when served at food stalls alongside Filipino barbecue with communal dipping pots, day-old chicks are given their own dipping vessel to avoid mixing with the other foods.

Day-old chicks are occasionally prepared as Filipino barbecue, wherein they are covered in a marinade that includes banana ketchup, lemon-lime soda, and calamansi, then grilled on a skewer.

== History ==
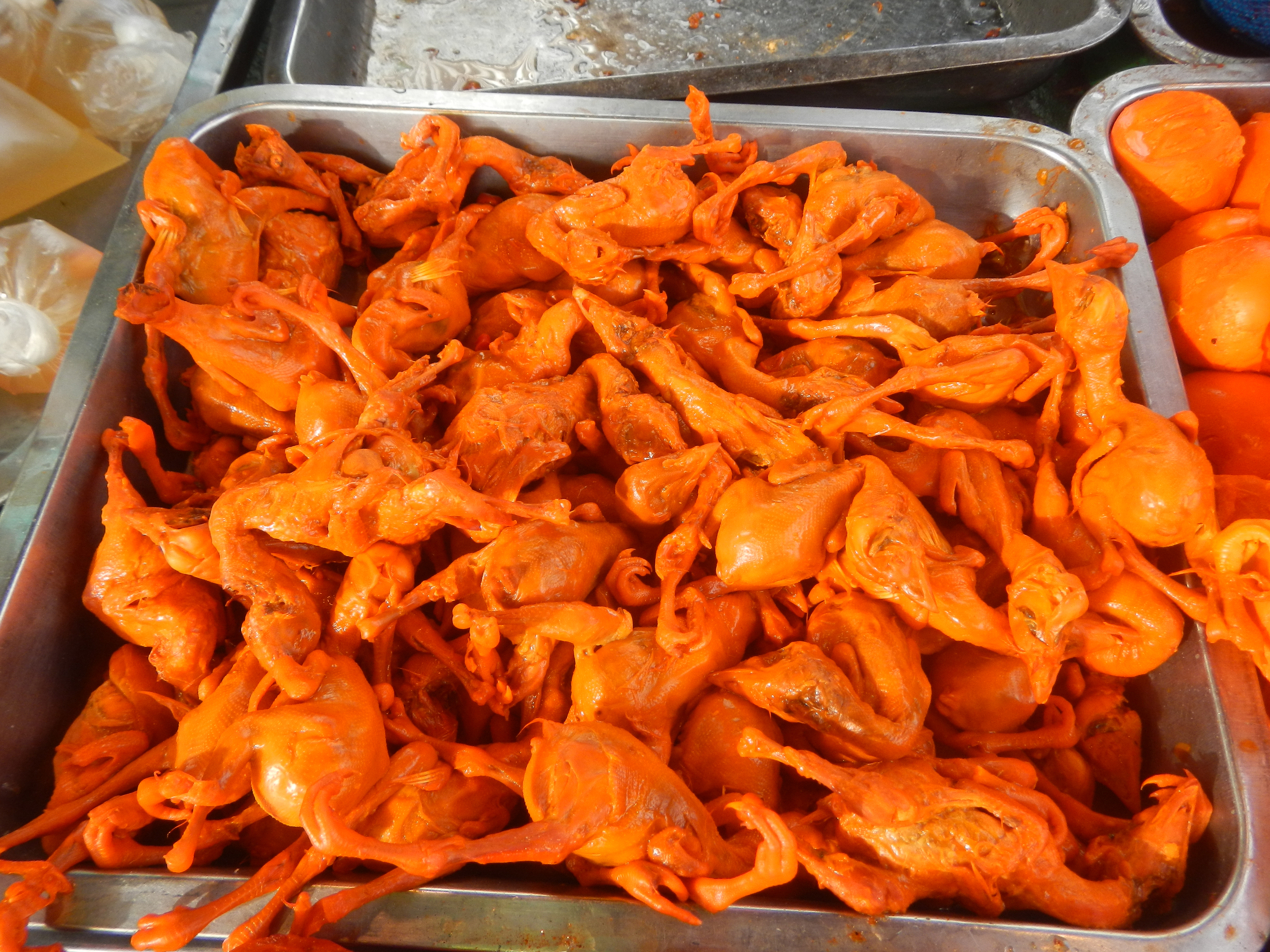
Day-old chicks at a carinderia

Day-old chicks first arose as a pulutan bar snack in Pampanga, Philippines, making use of culled male chicks from the Filipino poultry industry otherwise destined for fertilizer production or ocean dumping: male chicks are deemed inferior in factory farming settings to females, as they will not produce eggs, and they fatten less efficiently for meat production.

Since the dish's introduction in Metro Manila, day-old chick has grown in popularity across the Philippines as street food, both in urban areas and rural communities. As a result, day-old chick may carry a stigma of contamination by salmonella or otherwise, inherited from the reputation of the wider Filipino street-food industry.

== See also ==
- Fried chicken
- Kushikatsu, Japanese fried skewers
- Fried spider
- Rat-on-a-stick
