= Rat meat =

Meat from rats used as food

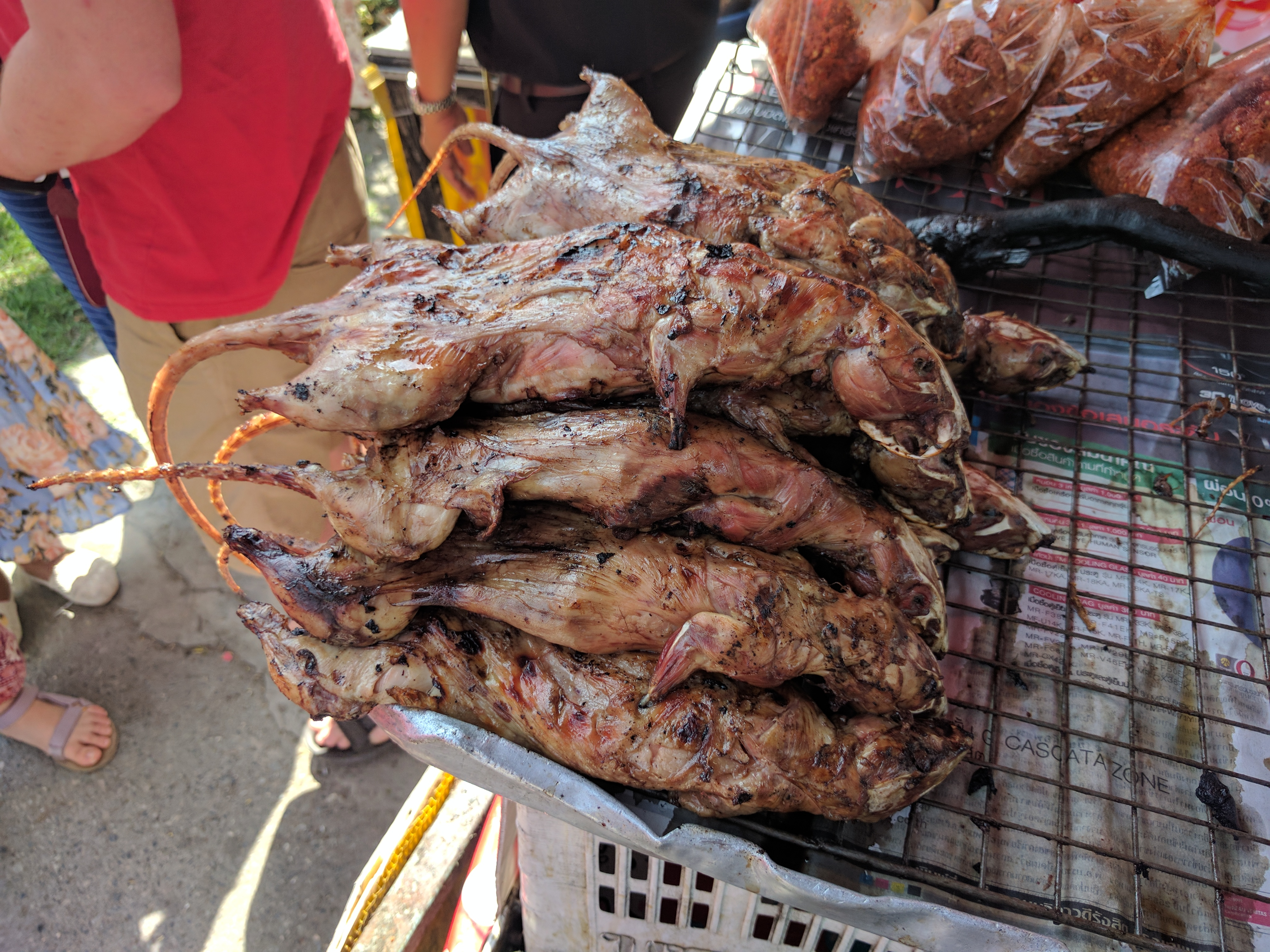
Barbecued rats for sale, in Thailand

Rat meat is the meat of various species of rat: medium-sized, long-tailed rodents. It is a food that, while taboo in some cultures, is a dietary staple in others. Taboos include fears of disease or religious prohibition, but in many places, the high number of rats has led to their incorporation into the local diets.

== Regionally ==
=== Africa ===
In Malawi of East Africa, people there hunted field mice in corn fields for food: they strung the mice on sticks and cooked, salted or dried the mice as a popular delicacy in markets and roadside stalls. In Sub-Saharan Africa where cane rats are found, some people have the habit of eating them.

=== Asia ===
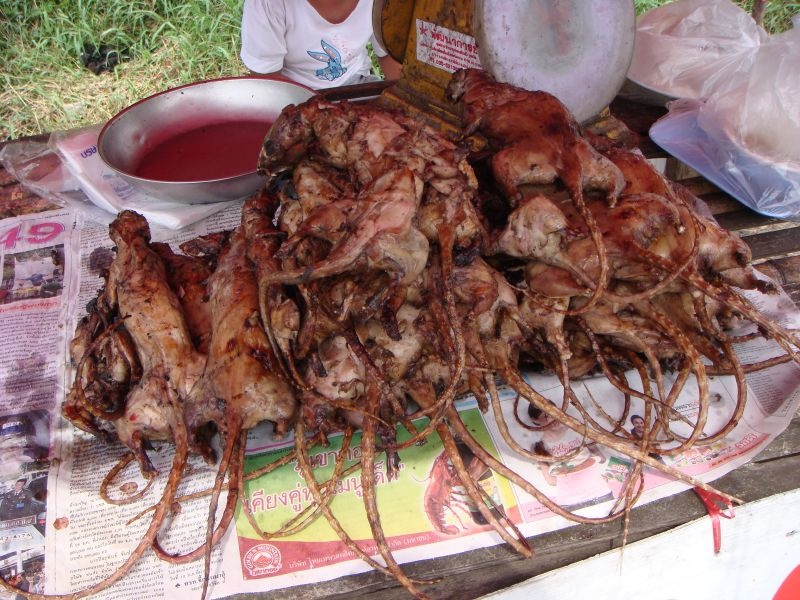
Rat (most likely ricefield rat) on sale for meat in Thailand

In some cultures, rats are or have been limited as an acceptable form of food to a particular social or economic class. In the Mishmi culture of India, rats are essential to the traditional diet, as Mishmi women may eat no meat except fish, pork, wild birds and rats. Conversely, the Musahar community in north India has commercialised rat farming as an exotic delicacy.

Ricefield rat (Rattus argentiventer) meat is eaten in Vietnamese, Taiwanese, Cambodian and Chinese cuisines. Rat-on-a-stick is a roasted rat dish consumed in Vietnam and Cambodia.

A 2020 study on wildlife trade in three southern Vietnamese provinces found that 55 percent of the field rats sold in tested restaurants were carrying a coronavirus.

=== Europe ===
In Victorian Britain rich and poor ate rat pie. During food rationing due to World War II, British biologists were known to eat laboratory rats, creamed.

A recipe for grilled rats, Bordeaux-style, calls for the use of alcoholic rats who live in wine cellars. These rats are skinned and eviscerated, brushed with a thick sauce of olive oil and crushed shallots, and grilled over a fire of broken wine barrels.

=== North America ===
In West Virginia, rat stew originated during economic hardship due to a collapse in the mining industry. The dish is an example of roadkill cuisine and has appeared in the Marlington Roadkill Cook-off.

=== Polynesia ===
In the traditional cultures of the Hawaiians and the Polynesians, rat was an everyday food for commoners. When feasting, the Polynesian people of Rapa Nui could eat rat meat, but the king was not allowed to, due to the islanders' belief in his "state of sacredness" called tapu. In studying precontact archaeological sites in Hawaii, archaeologists have found the concentration of the remains of rats associated with commoner households accounted for three times the animal remains associated with elite households. The rat bones found in all sites are fragmented, burned and covered in carbonized material, indicating the rats were eaten as food. The greater occurrence of rat remains associated with commoner households may indicate the elites of precontact Hawaii did not consume them as a matter of status or taste.

=== South America ===
Both the Shipibo people of Peru and Sirionó people of Bolivia have cultural taboos against the eating of rats.

== As food for pets ==
Rats are a common food item for snakes, both in the wild, and as pets. Adult rat snakes and ball pythons, for example, are fed a diet of mostly rats in captivity. Rats are readily available (live or frozen) to individual snake owners, as well as to pet shops and reptile zoos, from many suppliers. In Britain, the Animal Welfare Act 2006 "legally required that prey be killed before feeding unless absolutely necessary for the health of the predator." The rule was put into place mainly because of the pressure of the RSPCA and people who said the feeding of live animals was cruel.

== See also ==
- Rat-on-a-stick
- List of meat dishes
