= El Salvador–Mexico relations =

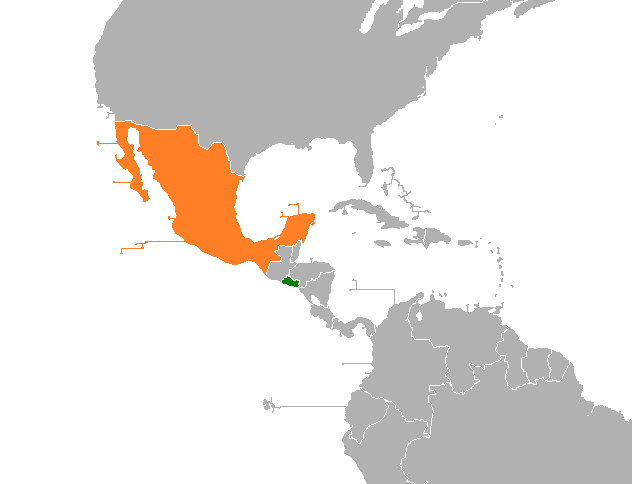

- El Salvador: Mexico

The nations of El Salvador and Mexico established diplomatic relations in 1838. Both nations are members of the Association of Caribbean States, Community of Latin American and Caribbean States, Organization of American States, Organization of Ibero-American States and the United Nations.

== History ==
Before the arrival of European explorers to the Americas, El Salvador and Central-Mexico were once populated by Uto-Aztecan language speakers and both southern Mexico and El Salvador once belonged to the Mayan civilization. During Spanish colonization, both nations were part of the Viceroyalty of New Spain. In 1821, Mexico obtained independence from Spain and most nations of Central America, including El Salvador, were a part of the First Mexican Empire under Emperor Agustín de Iturbide. In 1823, the Mexican empire collapsed and El Salvador became part of the Federal Republic of Central America along with Guatemala, Honduras, Nicaragua and Costa Rica. In 1838, the union dissolved and El Salvador became its own independent states. That same year, El Salvador and Mexico established diplomatic relations.

In 1916, the Government of Venustiano Carranza donated a wireless station to El Salvador. In reciprocity, Salvadoran President Carlos Meléndez sent five thousand rifles and a small group of men as requested by the Mexican Government so that they would join the constitutionalist forces and fight against Victoriano Huerta. In 1917, the Mexican Government donated a biplane to the Polytechnic School of El Salvador, and the Salvadoran Government gave Mexico land for the construction of the Mexican legation in the capital city of San Salvador. That same year, both nations open diplomatic missions in each other's capitals, respectively and in 1943, their respective diplomatic missions were elevated to embassies.

From 1979 to 1992, El Salvador was enveloped in a bloody civil war. During the war, several thousand Salvadorean citizens fled the country to Mexico where many stayed or continued onward to the United States. In 1992, the Salvadorean government and FMLN signed a peace agreement in Mexico City known as the Chapultepec Peace Accords thus in effect, ending the civil war.

Both nations have cooperated together in combating drug trafficking and gang violence, including MS-13 (also known as the Mara Salvatrucha) of which was the main cause of havoc in El Salvador and their operations created insecurity in the country. In 2018, several hundreds to a few thousands Salvadorans formed part of the Central American migrant caravans and traversed all of Mexico to the northern city of Tijuana to request asylum in the United States. In January 2019, over 700 Salvadorans requested and obtained asylum in Mexico where many chose to remain rather than face the uncertainty of trying to request asylum in the U.S. and also not wishing to be denied and deported back to El Salvador. In 2022, the number of Salvadorans requesting asylum in Mexico increased to more than 5,500.

In June 2019, Salvadoran President Nayib Bukele traveled to the Mexican state of Chiapas and met with Mexican President Andrés Manuel López Obrador. Leaders of both nations discussed initiatives to decrease the flow of Salvadoran migrants to Mexico en route to the United States and Mexico's commitment to Central Americas development, as well as implement the Sembrando Vida and Jóvenes Construyendo el Futuro programs. In May 2022, Mexican President Andrés Manuel López Obrador paid an official visit to El Salvador.

== High-level visits ==
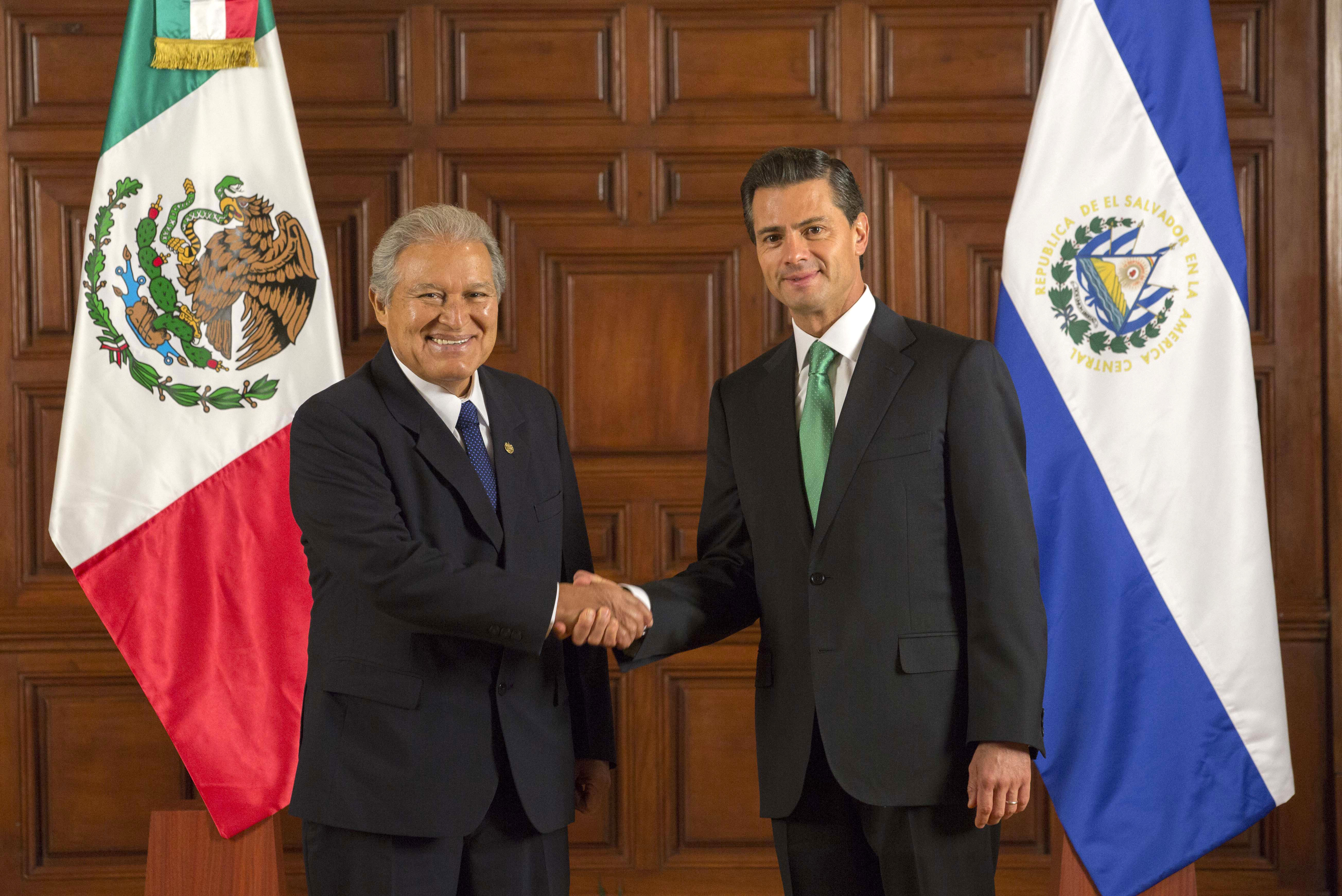
Salvadoran President Salvador Sánchez Cerén with Mexican president Enrique Peña Nieto in Mexico City; 2014.

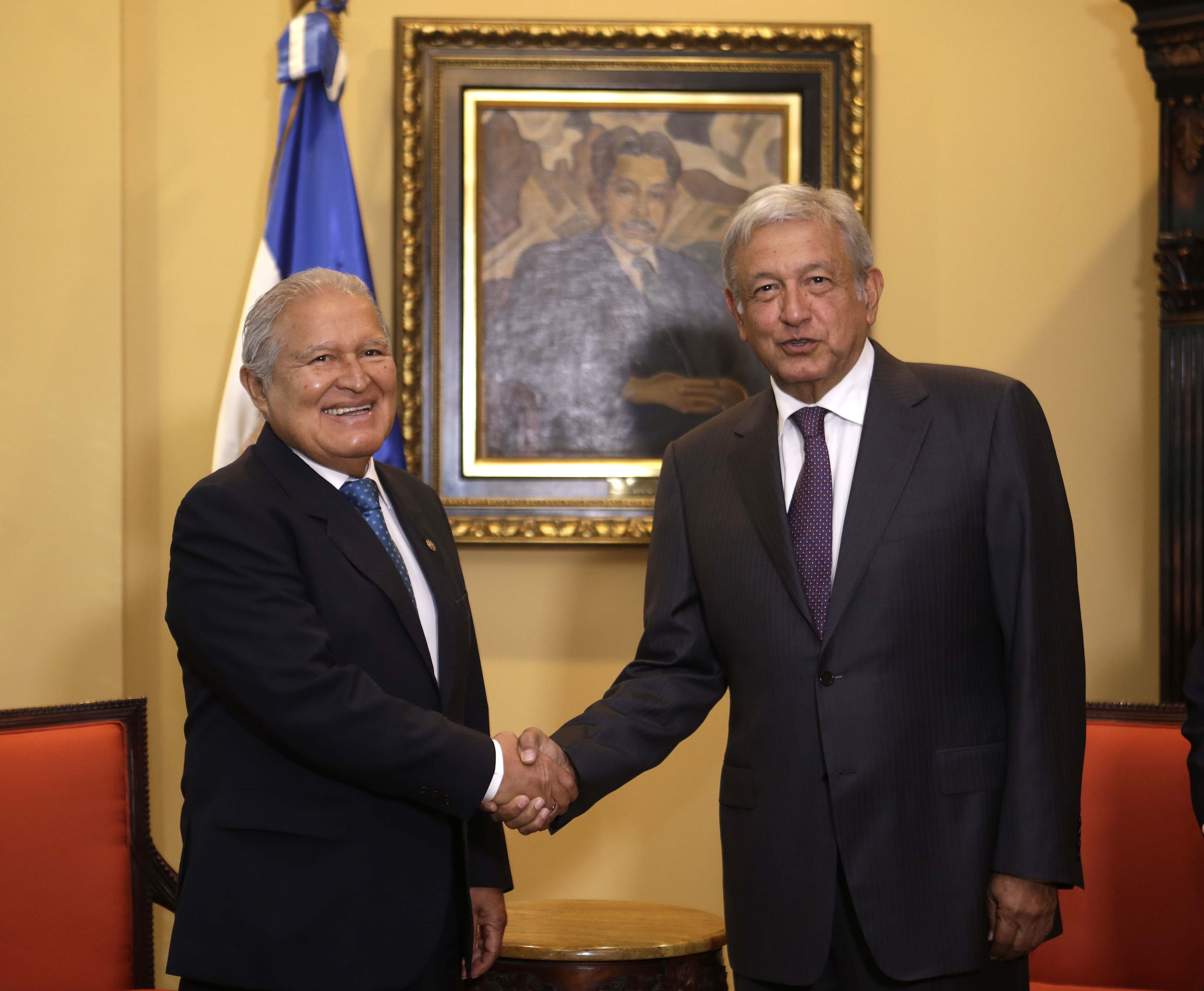
Salvadoran President Salvador Sánchez Cerén meeting with then presidential candidate Andrés Manuel López Obrador in San Salvador, 2017.

Presidential visits from El Salvador to Mexico

- President Fidel Sánchez Hernández (1968)
- President Arturo Armando Molina (1973)
- President José Napoleón Duarte (1988)
- President Alfredo Cristiani (1990, 1991, 1992)
- President Armando Calderón Sol (1997)
- President Francisco Flores Pérez (2002)
- President Antonio Saca (2005, 2008)
- President Mauricio Funes (2010, 2011)
- President Salvador Sánchez Cerén (October & December 2014)
- President Nayib Bukele (2019)

Presidential visits from Mexico to El Salvador

- President Gustavo Díaz Ordaz (1966)
- President Carlos Salinas de Gortari (1993)
- President Ernesto Zedillo (1998)
- President Vicente Fox (2001, 2004)
- President Felipe Calderón (2007, March & October 2008, 2009)
- President Andrés Manuel López Obrador (2022)

== Bilateral agreements ==
Both nations have signed several bilateral agreements such as an Agreement on the Regular and Permanent Exchange of Scientific, Literary or Artistic Works (1895); Agreement for the Protection and Restitution of Archaeological, Artistic and Historical Monuments (1990); Agreement on Touristic Cooperation (1990); Agreement of Cooperation to Combat Drug Trafficking and Drug Dependency (1993); Treaty on the Execution of Criminal Sentences (1993); Treaty for the Recovery and Return of Stolen Vehicles and Aircraft (1995); Agreement on Scientific and Technical Cooperation (1995); Extradition Treaty (1997); Agreement on Educational and Cultural Cooperation (1997); Treaty of Cooperation on Mutual Legal Assistance in Criminal Matters (1997) and an Air Transportation Agreement (2006).

== Transportation ==
There are direct flights between both nations with the following airlines: Aeroméxico Connect, Avianca El Salvador and with Volaris El Salvador.

== Trade ==
In June 2000, Mexico and El Salvador (along with Guatemala and Honduras) signed a free trade agreement which took effect in 2001. Since then, both Costa Rica and Nicaragua have joined the joint free trade agreement. In 2023, total trade between El Salvador and Mexico amounted to US$1.4 billion. El Salvador's main exports to Mexico include: clothing, electrical wires and cables, household items, sugar cane, oils of petroleum and imitation jewelry. Mexico's main exports to El Salvador include: electrical equipment and machinery, food based products, fruits, dairy, medicine, chemicals, and motor vehicles.

In 2023, Mexico was the second largest foreign direct investor in El Salvador with US$94 million invested in the country. Several Mexican multinational companies such as América Móvil, Cemex, Grupo Bimbo, Gruma, Sigma Alimentos (among others) operate in El Salvador.

== Resident diplomatic missions ==
of El Salvador in Mexico

- Mexico City (Embassy)
- Acayucan (Consulate-General)
- Ciudad Juárez (Consulate-General)
- Guadalajara (Consulate-General)
- Monterrey (Consulate-General)
- Oaxaca City (Consulate-General)
- San Luis Potosí (Consulate-General)
- Tapachula (Consulate-General)
- Tijuana (Consulate-General)
- Villahermosa (Consulate-General)

of Mexico in El Salvador

- San Salvador (Embassy)

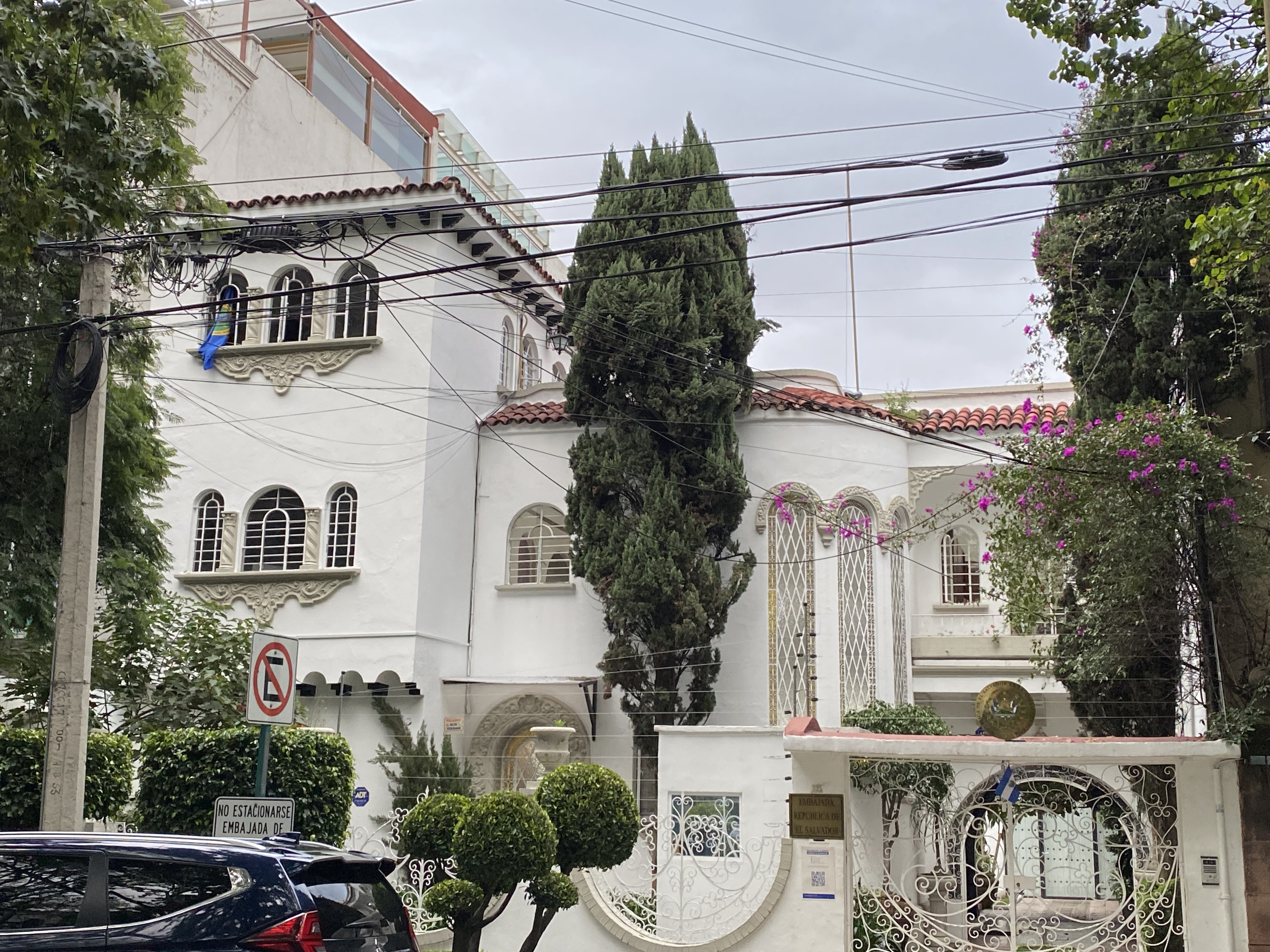
Embassy of El Salvador in Mexico City

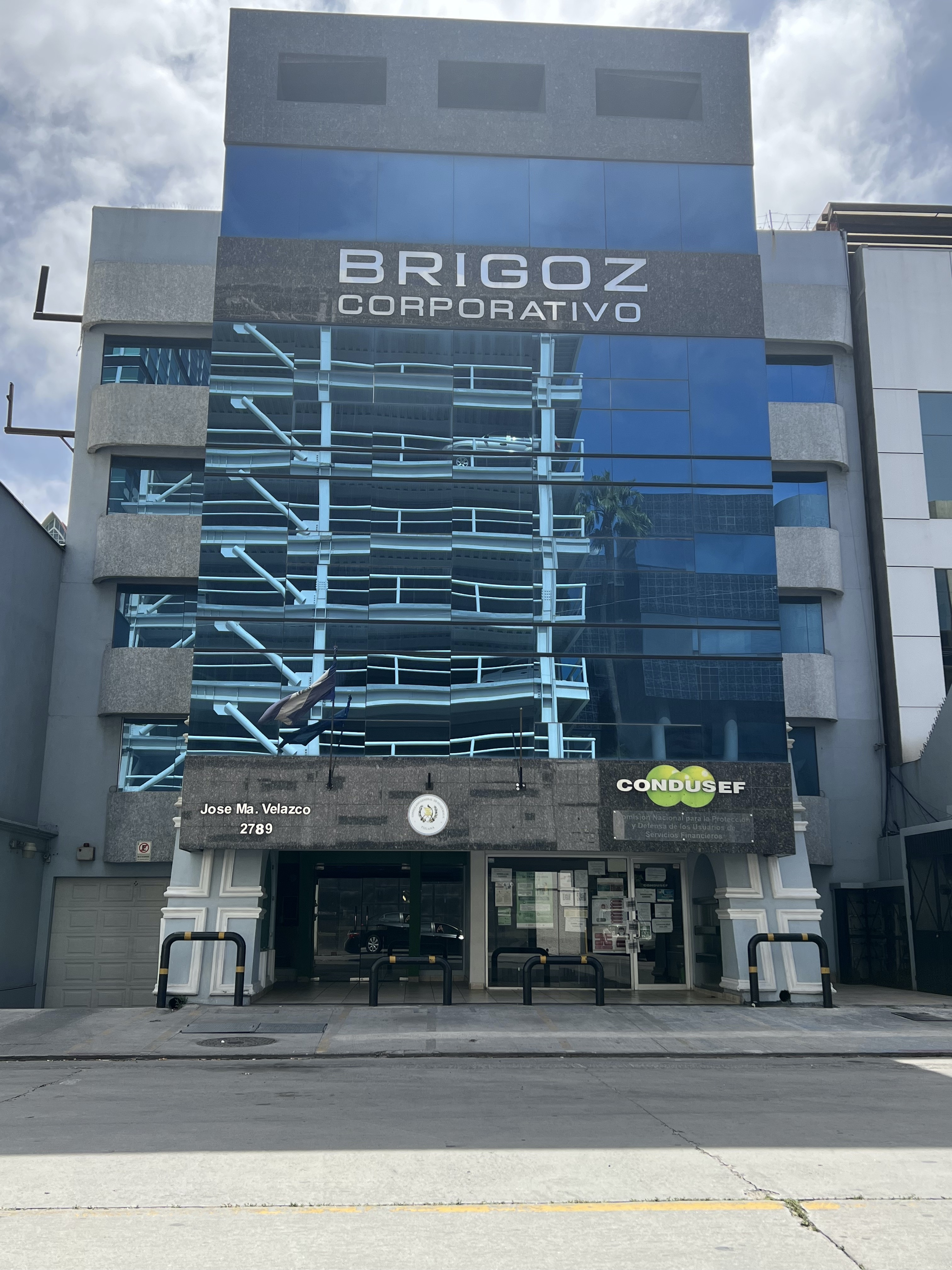
Consulate-General of El Salvador in Tijuana

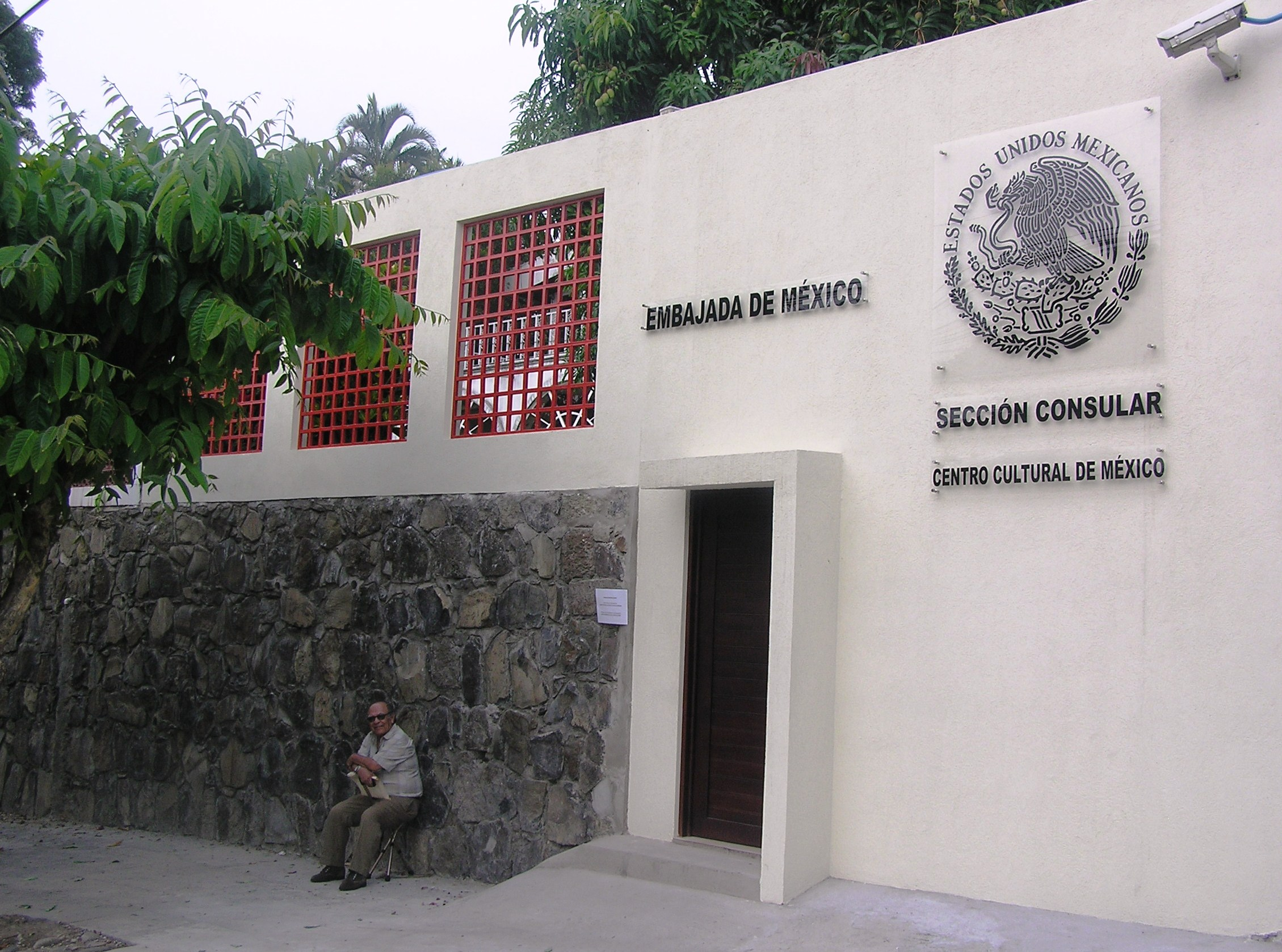
Embassy of Mexico in San Salvador

== Gallery ==
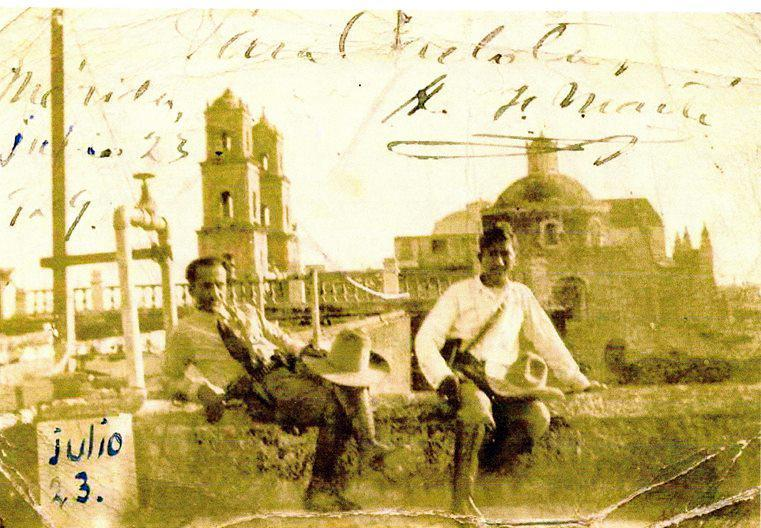
Salvadoran revolutionary Farabundo Martí and Nicaraguan revolutionary Augusto César Sandino in Mérida, Mexico

"Av. Rep. de El Salvador" street plaque in Mexico City

Mexican soldiers taking part in Fuerzas Comando in El Salvador

Flags of Mexico and El Salvador at the National Palace in Mexico City

== See also ==
- Salvadoran Mexicans
