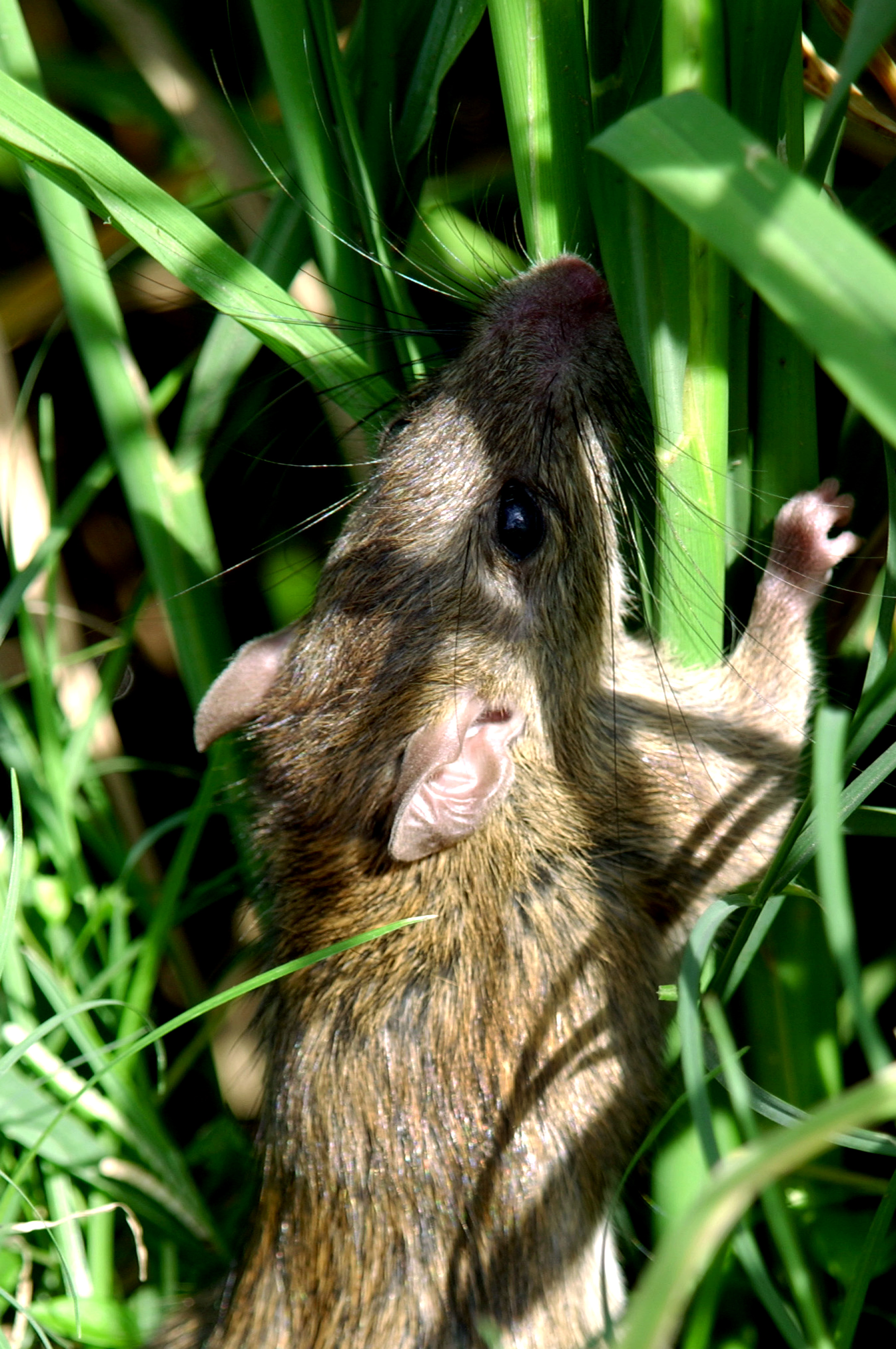

Conservation status
- Least Concern (IUCN 3.1)

Scientific classification
- Kingdom: Animalia
- Phylum: Chordata
- Class: Mammalia
- Order: Rodentia
- Family: Muridae
- Genus: Rattus
- Species: R. argentiventer

Binomial name
- Rattus argentiventer (Robinson & Kloss, 1916)
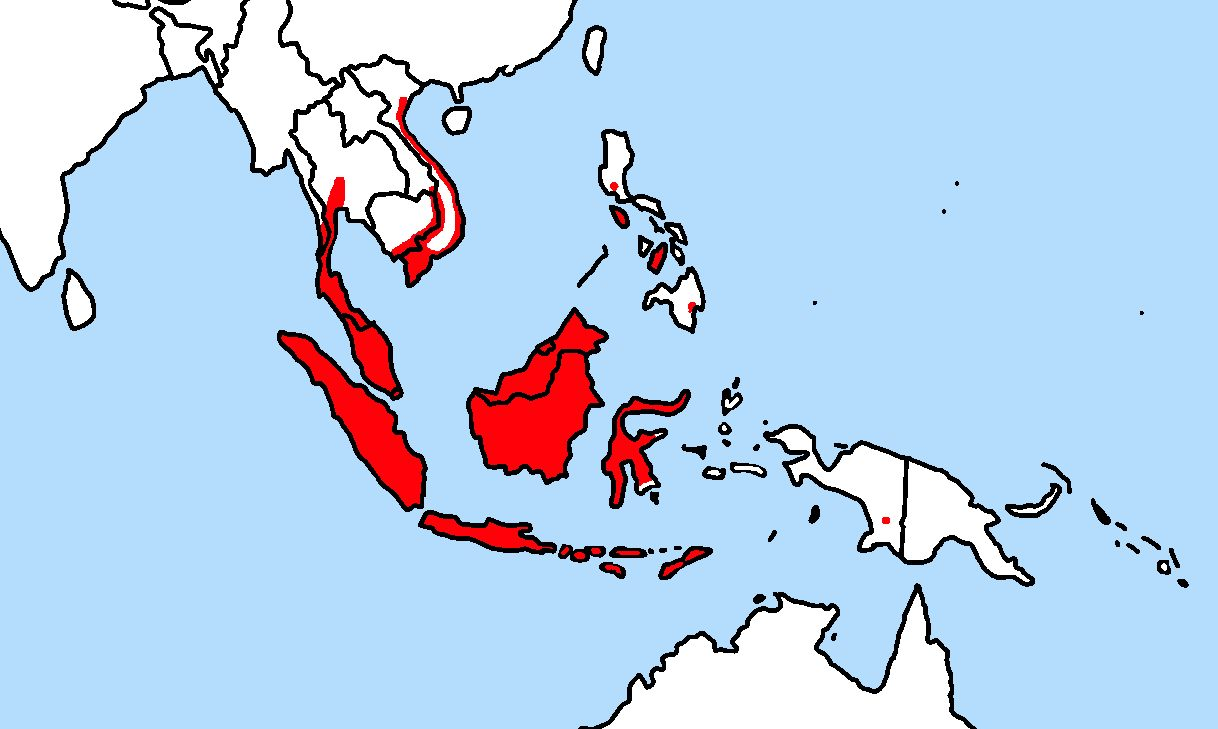

= Ricefield rat =

Species of rodent

The ricefield rat (Rattus argentiventer) is a species of rat found throughout Southeast Asia.

== Description ==
The ricefield rat is between 304–400 mm (12.0–15.7 in) long with a tail length of 140–200 mm (5.5–7.9 in) and a skull length of 37–41 mm (1.5–1.6 in). It has a grizzled yellow-brown and black pelage, a gray belly with whiter flanks, and a tail that is uniformly medium brown. Young rats have an orange-colored tuft in front of each ear. It has chisel-like incisors. The average weight of Rattus argentiventer is around 97 to 219 g (3.4 to 7.7 oz). Females have 12 mammae.

== Behavior ==
The ricefield rat lives in large groups with a dominant male and female. When attacked or disturbed, they will produce squeals and whistle sounds. Rattus argentiventer's main diet includes termites, insects, grasshoppers, snails, seeds, nuts, rice, vegetables, and fruits. Ricefield rats feed at night and move actively at dusk and dawn. During daytime, they can be seen among vegetation, weeds, or maturing fields. Ricefield rat mothers undergo a 3-week gestation period before giving birth to a litter of 5 to 10 young.

== Distribution ==
The ricefield rat can be found in grassland habitats throughout Southeast Asia. It is a major rodent pest in rice fields.

Although not a staple food in Cambodia, a growing rat meat market has developed there with most exports going to Vietnam. Rat-catching season reaches its height after the rice harvest in June and July, when rats have little to eat. That lack of food coincides with seasonal rains that force the rodents onto higher ground, where traps are set up to catch them.

== Parasites ==
Parasites of the ricefield rat include:

- Schistosoma spindale
