= Salvadoran Mexicans =

Salvadoran Mexicans salvadoreño-mexicanos
Total population
- 10,315 El Salvador-born residents (2017); Unknown number of Mexicans of Salvadoran descent

Regions with significant populations
- Chiapas, Baja California and Nuevo León

Languages
- Spanish

Religion
- Roman Catholicism

Related ethnic groups
- Salvadorans, Salvadoran diaspora

Salvadoran Mexicans (Spanish: salvadoreño-mexicanos) are people of Salvadoran descent living in Mexico.

== Migration history ==
The largest wave of Salvadorans arrived in Mexico as refugees during the Salvadoran Civil War.

== Demographics ==
During the 2010 Census, there were 8,088 El Salvador-born individuals registered as living in Mexico. According to the Salvadoran consul in Mexico José Antonio Domínguez Mena, as of December 2016 only 10% to 15% of Salvadoran nationals were registered with the Instituto Nacional de Migración.

== Institutions ==
- Asociación Salvadoreña Mexicana, A. C.
- Asociación de Salvadoreños residentes en Jalisco

== See also ==
- El Salvador–Mexico relations
- Salvadoran diaspora
- Ethnic groups in Mexico
