= Rat-on-a-stick =

Dish of roasted rat on a skewer

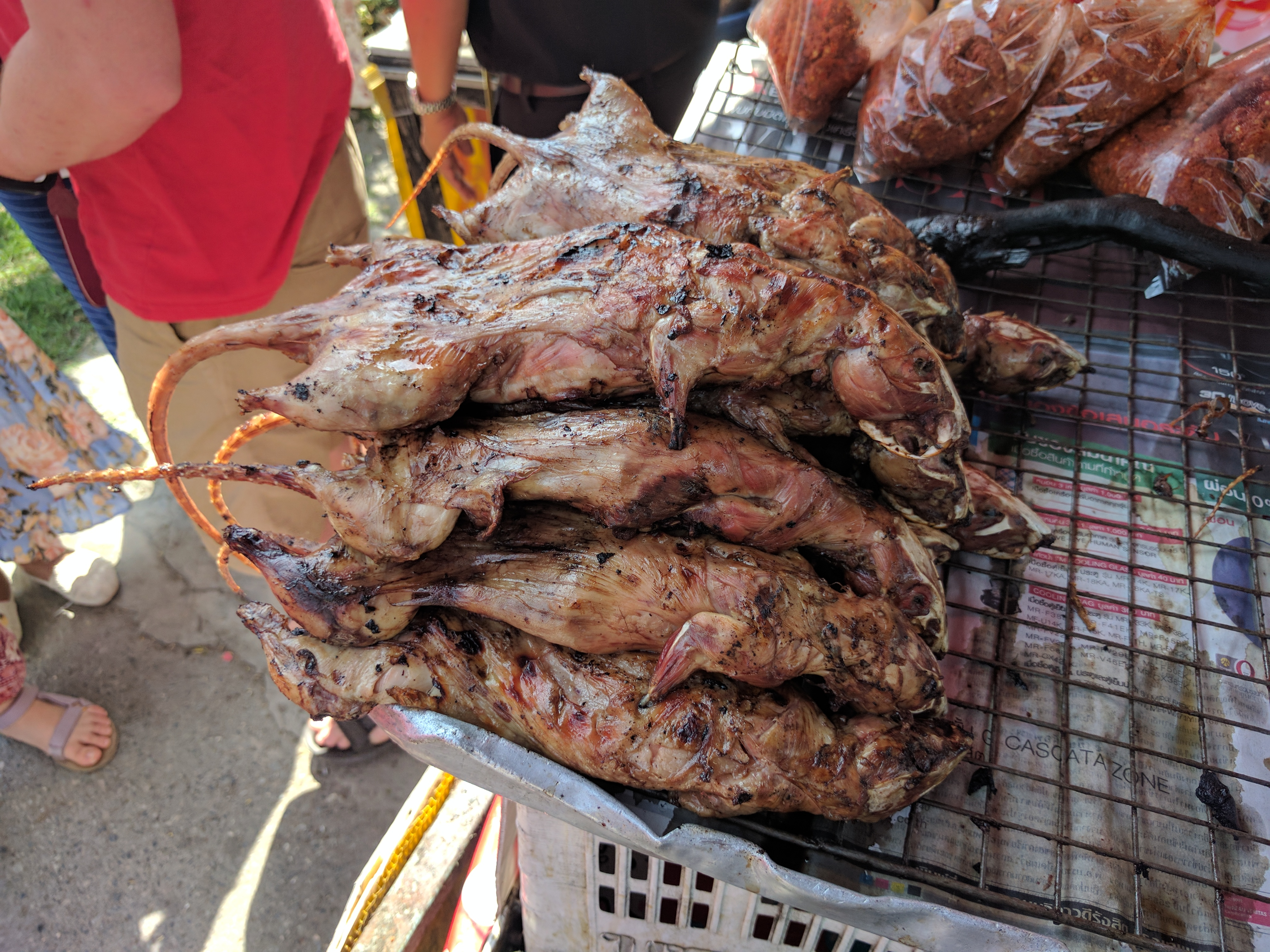
Barbecued rats for sale near Suphan Buri, Thailand

Rat-on-a-stick, also referred to as rat kebab, is a dish or snack consisting of a roasted rat served on a stick or skewer. The dish is consumed in Thailand and Vietnam. Prior to roasting, the rat is typically skinned and washed, after which it is gutted to remove its internal organs and then roasted.

== History ==
The act of roasting, grilling, and baking rats goes back millennia, all the way to the Tang Dynasty in ancient China (A.D. 618-907). The early Chinese ate what they called "household deers" which were most likely the common rat and also bamboo rats. It was not uncommon for them to eat newborn rats stuffed with honey, and much like today's skewers, they used chopsticks to eat them.

Not far away from China, the people of ancient Rome could also be found eating roasted and baked rats. The Romans popularized eating dormice during the second century. The rats would be caught and trapped in autumn when they were at their fattest and then roasted or baked, dipped in honey, stuffed with pine nuts or pork, and seasoned with different spices. The Romans enjoyed this meal so much that they even started breeding these dormice and fed them pine nuts to fatten them up.

During the 16th century, a tribe in New Zealand named the Maori started trapping Polynesian rats using snares and pit traps. They introduced it to the rest of Polynesia as a food item by bringing it with them on ships to eat while sailing.

During the siege of Paris in 1871 and in World War II, many people were forced to eat city rats due to food shortages, even though they were generally not eaten because of their association with filth and disease.

South of Nigeria, in Mawali, rats were cooked and eaten, but only specific rats were allowed because of cultural restrictions. It was said that only rats caught from bushes were allowed to be consumed. If you ate a rat found inside your home, it would be considered cannibalism because sometimes house rats would eat the fingers and toes of the residents.

Lastly, in the Philippines, it was common to eat Philippine rice field rats and Asian rice field rats because of their abundance in rice fields. They would start by skinning them, then removing any organs, letting them dry out in the sun, and finally deep-frying them and serving them with coconut oil. Even the students at Los Baños University in the Philippines agreed that rat meat sausages were as acceptable as pork sausages.

== Present day ==
Today, the consumption of rats is very popular in Asia, specifically in Thailand and the Philippines. They can be found grilled over an open flame, creating a portable street food snack, at almost any market in Southeast Asia. The continuation of this food item is not only because of the taste, but also because of its economic solution. Because of the abundance of rats in rice fields, the cooking simplicity, and low cost, rat meat is a protein-packed alternative that greatly helps people in poverty. Most commonly, it helps poor farmers facing food shortages after rice harvests. These farmers' fields can produce up to 20,000 rats, some to cook for themselves, and some to sell to street vendors, solving not only the food problem but also becoming an extra way to make some money.

== By country ==
Rat meat is considered by some people in South Vietnam, East and Northeast India, and Thailand to be a delicacy. In recent times, its popularity has increased in these countries. It is also served as a street food in these countries. Rat kebab became so popular it also started to appear in a number of elegant restaurants. Rat kebab is also a dish in some Cantonese recipes.

== Source of rats ==
According to a BBC report, the rats are wild, and caught by professionals using traps.

== In popular culture ==
- Rat-on-a-stick has been consumed by contestants on the U.S. reality television show Survivor. (Note: "Live larvae for lunch and rat-on-a-stick for dinner may be the reality for the castaways on CBS's hit show Survivor...")
- On 14 March 2019, Vietnamese rat meat was featured in National Geographic.
- In the film Demolition Man, Sylvester Stallone's character inadvertently orders a hamburger made of rat meat.

== See also ==
- Rat meat
- List of meat dishes
