= Sowing Life =

Social program in Mexico

Logo

Sowing Life (Spanish: Sembrando Vida) is a Mexican government social and agricultural development program established in 2019 during the presidency of Andrés Manuel López Obrador. It is a reforestation program administered by the Secretariat of Welfare (Bienestar), proposed to address rural poverty, promote food self-sufficiency, and restore degraded land through sustainable agricultural practices.

The agroforestry program provides financial assistance and agricultural supplies, by supporting community nurseries and facilities, as well as the planting of fruit and timber trees. Participants must own the land and require 2.5 hectares (6.2 acres) available to apply.

By September 2026, its coverage had reached 1,139,024 hectares (2,814,590 acres) across 24 Mexican states, with more than 400,000 registered participants. The program has since been expanded to Caribbean and Central American countries, including Belize, Cuba, El Salvador and Guatemala.

Initially, due to its wording, Sowing Life incentivized deforestation by allowing farmers to cut down healthy trees and plant new ones in order to receive subsidies. In one village in Campeche, two-thirds of the participants had cut down trees so they could qualify. According to a World Resources Institute study, 72,830 hectares (180,000 acres) of trees were deforested in eight states. Gustavo Sánchez, president of the Mexican Network of Peasant Forest Organizations, said the selection process also lacked transparency and could potentially be used as a clientelist program to secure votes.

== See also ==
- Perverse incentive
