= Rodent farming =

Agricultural process of raising rodents

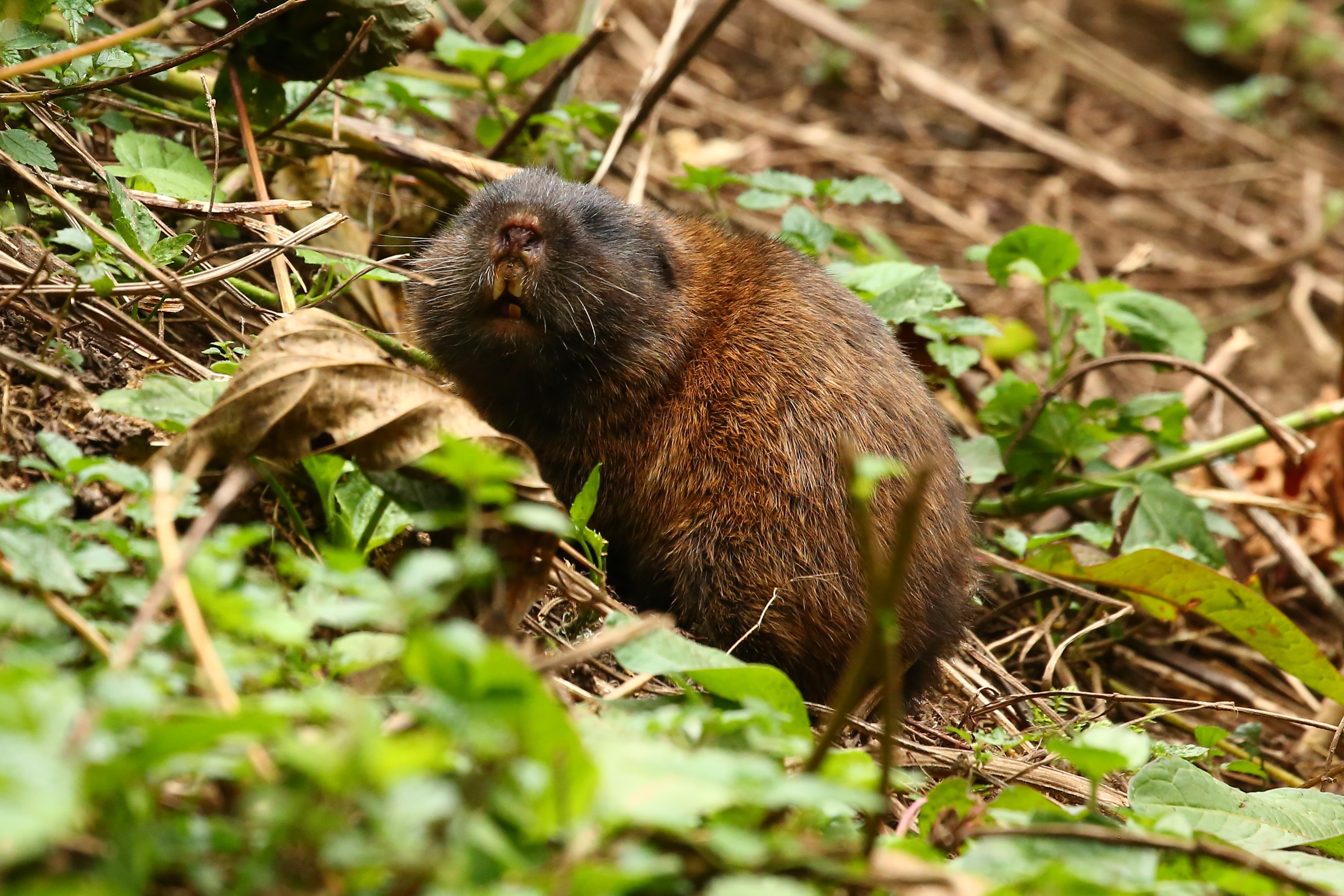
East African Mole Rat, one of the commonly farmed rats in parts of Africa

Rodent farming is an agricultural process in which rodents are bred and raised with the intent of selling them for their meat. They are often categorised in a sub-category of livestock known as micro-livestock, due to their small size. Rodents have been used as food in a wide range of cultures, including Hawaiian, Vietnamese, French, Indian and Thai.

Rodent farming has been suggested as a solution to the world's increased requirements for food associated with an increasing population as a result of a number of perceived benefits with their production and consumption.

== As food ==
Rodents have been hunted and farmed in a number of cultures. The polynesian rat was hunted and consumed by the common people in pre-contact Hawaii. Capybaras, agoutis, and guinea pigs have historically been eaten in South America -- guinea pigs were farmed as far back in 2500 BCE in what is now Peru. Cane rats can grow up to 60 cm in length and weigh up to 10 kg and are hunted as bush meat in western and central Africa. Rats were commonly eaten during the Tang Dynasty in China; they may have been domesticated as they were called “household deer”. The Mishmi people in the Lohit district in India traditionally hunted rats. Dishes with rats captured in wine cellars are described in Larousse Gastronomique and rats are eaten in rural Thailand.

== Farming ==
A perverse incentive led to rat farming in 1902, when rat catchers bred rats in the sewers of Hanoi to collect a reward that the colonial government of French Indochina offered for rat tails.

In the contemporary era, rodent farming has been suggested as a sustainable agriculture method to address current global malnutrition and to meet the needs of the world's growing population. Rodent farming can be economically efficient, since they can produce a large number of offspring per year, have a limited gestation period, and have a high feed conversion ratio. They require little space, so could be farmed in urban areas.

Efforts have been made to develop rat farming among the dalit in the Indian state of Bihar; one obstacle to this is that the animal vehicle of the god Ganesh is a rat.

In Cameroon, cane rats is encouraged in economic development efforts.

In Australia, a rat farm that provides food for zoos and pet stores was the subject of a 2018 profile.

== Management ==
Rodents can be kept in sheds or cages, and fed grain, pellets, or scraps. In nations with strict animal cruelty regulations, such as Australia, the animals must be killed humanely, for example by gassing with carbon dioxide. In nations without these regulations, it is more common for the animals to be killed by drowning or bludgeoning.

== See also ==
- Cuniculture, farming rabbits (a lagomorph)
