= Perverse incentive =

Incentive with unintended results

In economics, a perverse incentive is an incentive structure with undesirable results, particularly one where those effects are unexpected and contrary to the intentions of its designers.

The results of a perverse incentive scheme are also sometimes called cobra effect, where people are incentivized to make a problem worse. This name was coined by economist Horst Siebert in 2001 based on an anecdote taken from the British Raj. According to the story, the British government, concerned about the number of venomous cobras in Delhi, offered a bounty for every dead cobra. Initially, this was a successful strategy; large numbers of snakes were killed for the reward. Eventually, however, people began to breed cobras for the income. When the government became aware of this, the reward program was scrapped, and the cobra breeders set their snakes free, leading to an overall increase in the wild cobra population.

== Examples of perverse incentives ==
=== Pest control campaigns ===
- The Great Hanoi Rat Massacre occurred in 1902, in Hanoi, Vietnam (then known as French Indochina), when, under French colonial rule, the colonial government created a bounty program that paid a reward of 1¢ for each rat killed. To collect the bounty, people would need to provide the severed tail of a rat. Colonial officials, however, began noticing rats in Hanoi with no tails. The Vietnamese rat catchers would capture rats, sever their tails, then release them back into the sewers so that they could produce more rats.
- Experiencing an issue with feral pigs, the U.S. Army post Fort Benning in Georgia offered hunters a $40-bounty for every pig tail turned in. Over the course of the 2007–2008 program, the feral pig population in the area increased. While there were some reports that individuals purchased pigs' tails from meat processors then resold the tails to the Army at the higher bounty price, a detailed study of the bounty scheme found different effects from perverse incentives were mainly responsible. Both the pigs' fertility rate and offspring survival rates increased under the scheme. This was due to improved nutrition made available by the feed bait used to attract the animals to hunting sites. Secondly, hunters were found to be more likely to preferentially target large males as "trophy"-quality game, while ignoring females and juveniles as targets. Removal of mature males from the population has a negligible impact on population growth, as remaining mature males, or juvenile males that soon mature, can each stud many breeding sows.

=== Community safety and harm reduction ===
- In 2002, British officials tasked with suppressing opium production in Afghanistan offered poppy farmers $700 an acre in return for destroying their crop. This ignited a poppy-growing frenzy among Afghan farmers, who sought to plant as many poppies as they could in order to collect payouts from the cash-for-poppies program. Some farmers harvested and sold the sap before destroying the plants, thereby receiving significantly more money for the same amount of poppies.
- Gun buyback programs are carried out by governments to reduce the number of guns in circulation, by purchasing firearms from citizens at a flat rate (and then usually destroying them). Some residents of areas with gun buyback programs have 3D printed large numbers of crude parts that met the minimum legal definition of a firearm for the purpose of immediately turning them in for the cash payout.
- In 2021, the US Congress enacted stringent requirements to prevent sesame, a potential allergen, from cross-contaminating other foods. Many companies found it simpler and less expensive to instead modify their recipes and labels by adding sesame directly as an ingredient to foods that would not otherwise contain any, and thus avoid being affected by the law, while increasing the overall number of foods which contained sesame.
- In Alberta, under the Child, Youth and Family Enhancement Act, every person must report suspected child abuse to a director or police officer, and failure to do so is punishable by a $10,000 fine plus 6 months of imprisonment. However, according to criminal law professor Ritesh Narayan, enforcing it would cause people to overreport, which wastes resources, and it would also create a chilling effect that prevents people from reporting child abuse observed over a period of time, as that would incriminate them for failing to report earlier. There are similar laws in other Canadian provinces.

=== Environmental and wildlife protection ===
- The United States Endangered Species Act of 1973 imposes development restrictions on landowners who find endangered species on their property. While this policy has some positive effects for wildlife, it also encourages preemptive habitat destruction (draining swamps or cutting down trees that might host valuable species) by landowners who fear losing the lucrative development-friendliness of their land because of the future presence of an endangered species. In some cases, endangered species may even be deliberately killed to avoid discovery.
- In 2005 the UN Intergovernmental Panel on Climate Change began an incentive scheme to cut down on greenhouse gases. Companies disposing of polluting gases were rewarded with carbon credits, which could eventually get converted into cash. The program set prices according to how serious the damage the pollutant could do to the environment was and attributed one of the highest bounties for destroying HFC-23, a byproduct of a common refrigerant, HCFC-22. As a result, companies began to produce more of this refrigerant in order to destroy more of the byproduct waste gas, and collect millions of dollars in credits. This increased production also caused the price of the refrigerant to decrease significantly, motivating refrigeration companies to continue using it, despite the adverse environmental effects. In 2013, credits for the destruction of HFC-23 were suspended in the European Union.
- In 2017, the Northern Irish Renewable Heat Incentive paid businesses to replace coal with renewable heating, typically bioenergy in the form of wood pellets. However, the subsidy for the energy was greater than its cost, which allowed businesses to make a profit simply by burning as much fuel as possible and heating empty buildings. The political fall-out caused the Northern Ireland Executive to collapse in 2017. It was not re-convened until 2020.
- In 2019, Mexico created Sowing Life, a reforestation program that caused deforestation in the first year.

=== Historic preservation schemes ===
- The United Kingdom's listed building regulations are intended to protect historically important buildings, by requiring owners to seek permission before making any changes to listed buildings. In 2017, the owners of an unlisted historic building in Bristol destroyed a 400-year-old ceiling the day before a scheduled visit by listings officers, allegedly to prevent the building from being listed, which could have limited future development.
- The Tax Reform Act of 1976 provided for loss of tax benefits if owners demolished buildings. This led to an increase in arson attacks in the 1970s as a way of clearing land without financial penalties. The law was later altered to remove this aspect.

=== Healthcare cost control ===
- Paying medical professionals and reimbursing insured patients for treatment but not prevention encourages medical conditions to be ignored until treatment is required. Moreover, paying only for treatment effectively discourages prevention (which would improve quality of life for the patient but would also reduce the demand for future treatments).
- Payment for medical treatment can generate a perverse incentive for unnecessary treatments. In 2015, a Detroit area doctor was sentenced to 45 years of prison for intentionally giving patients unnecessary cancer treatments, for which health insurance paid him at least $17.6 million. Unnecessary treatment itself may cause harm in the form of side effects of drugs and surgery, which can then trigger a demand for further treatments.
- In the United States, Medicare reimburses doctors at a higher rate if they administer more expensive medications to treat a condition. This creates an incentive for the physician to prescribe a more expensive drug when a less expensive one might perform well.

=== Humanitarian and welfare policies ===
- In the 2000s, Canada negotiated a "Safe Third Country Agreement" with the U.S. under which applicants for political asylum could only apply in the first of the two countries they reached, in order to discourage "asylum shopping". Among the provisions was one that barred anyone entering Canada at an official port of entry from requesting asylum there, in theory limiting asylum applications to either those filed by refugees in camps abroad or those who could legally travel to Canada and do so at an immigration office. In the late 2010s, some migrants began entering Canada illegally, between official border crossings, at places like Roxham Road between New York and Quebec, since once they were in Canada, they were allowed to file applications with the full range of appeals available to them, a process that could take years, and Canada wound up processing thousands more applications for asylum than it had planned to.

=== Promotional schemes and public relations ===
- Hacktoberfest is an October-long celebration to promote contributions to the free and open-source software communities. In 2020, participants were encouraged to submit four or more pull requests to any public free or open-source (FOSS) repository, with a free "Hacktoberfest 2020" T-shirt for the first 75,000 participants to do so. The free T-shirts caused frivolous pull requests on FOSS projects.
- Around 2010, online retailer Vitaly Borker found that online complaints about his eyeglass-sale website, DecorMyEyes, pushed the site to the top of Google searches and drove more traffic. He began responding to customer reports of poor quality and/or misfilled orders with insults, threats of violence, and other harassment. Borker continued writing toxic replies for a decade despite serving two separate sentences in U.S. federal prison over charges arising from them.

=== Returns for effort ===
- The 20th-century paleontologist G. H. R. von Koenigswald used to pay Javanese locals for each fragment of hominin skull that they produced. He later discovered that the people had been breaking up whole skulls into smaller pieces to maximize their payments. When he cancelled the payments, many locals burned the remaining skulls they had as retaliation.
- In building the first transcontinental railroad in the 1860s, the United States Congress agreed to pay the builders per mile of track laid. As a result, Thomas C. Durant of Union Pacific Railroad lengthened a section of the route, forming a bow shape and unnecessarily adding miles of track.
- Funding fire departments by the number of fire calls that are made is intended to reward fire departments that do the most work. However, it may discourage them from fire prevention activities, leading to an increase in actual fires.
- In 2025, Amazon introduced an internal "AI Token Consumption Leaderboard" tracking how heavily its software developers used AI tools, with a reported company goal that 80% of developers would use AI weekly. Employees reported intense pressure to climb the rankings, and many responded by running trivial or unnecessary tasks through an internal AI agent called MeshClaw - a practice that spread under the name "tokenmaxxing" - purely to inflate their token-consumption scores rather than to accomplish meaningful work.

=== Electoral systems ===
- An example in social choice theory is known as perverse response, where a candidate can lose an election if the voters rank them higher. This occurs under single transferable vote and related systems (like the two-round system).

== In literature ==
In his autobiography, Mark Twain says that his wife, Olivia Langdon Clemens, had a similar experience:

Once in Hartford the flies were so numerous for a time, and so troublesome, that Mrs. Clemens conceived the idea of paying George a bounty on all the flies he might kill. The children saw an opportunity here for the acquisition of sudden wealth. ... Any Government could have told her that the best way to increase wolves in America, rabbits in Australia, and snakes in India, is to pay a bounty on their scalps. Then every patriot goes to raising them.

== Historicity of the cobra anecdote ==
A 2025 investigation by the Friends of Snakes Society cast doubt on the historicity of Siebert's anecdote. The investigation found no contemporary records of cobra breeding operations or prosecutions in British India, and traced the story to an 1873 newspaper article that used speculative language ("it was alleged") rather than confirmed evidence. The investigation also uncovered that an 1887 inquiry by the Bombay Natural History Society, conducted specifically to address these rumors, concluded that breeding cobras in confinement was "highly improbable" and had never been documented. The Madras bounty program was actually scaled back in 1873 (restricting rewards to cobras only and cutting the bounty from two annas to one) due to high costs and not fraud. Despite 150 years of circulation, no documentation has been found to support the breeding claims that form the basis of the "cobra effect" term. It recommended retiring the term "Cobra Effect," stating: "Continuing to use 'Cobra Effect' today is not innocent shorthand. It perpetuates colonial misinformation that caricatured Indians as cunning opportunists."

== See also ==
- Conflict of interest – Situation when a party is involved in multiple interests
- Campbell's law – Adage about perverse incentives
- Goodhart's law – Adage about statistical measures
- Instrumental convergence – Hypothesis about intelligent agents
- Moral hazard – Increases in the exposure to risk when insured, or when another bears the cost
- Perverse subsidy – A type of perverse incentive
- Streisand effect – Increased awareness of information after suppression efforts
- The purpose of a system is what it does – Systems thinking heuristic
- Tragedy of the commons – Overuse of a shared resource
