= List of fried chicken dishes =

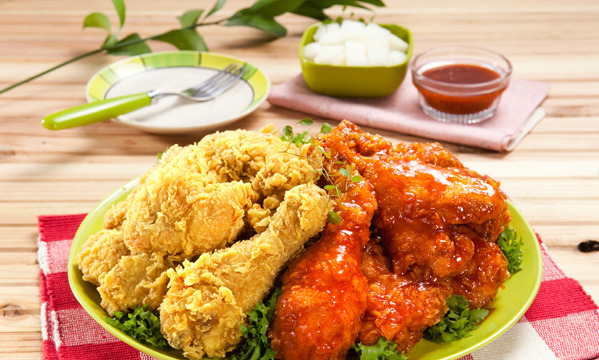
Korean fried chicken

This is a list of fried chicken dishes. Chicken is the most common type of poultry in the world, and was one of the first domesticated animals. Chicken is a major worldwide source of meat for human consumption, and is prepared as food in a wide variety of ways.

One common method of preparing chicken is frying, or cooking of food in oil or another fat. Fried chicken dishes include preparations that are deep fried, shallow fried, pan fried, stir fried or sautéed.

== Fried chicken dishes ==
Buffalo wings, an American dish

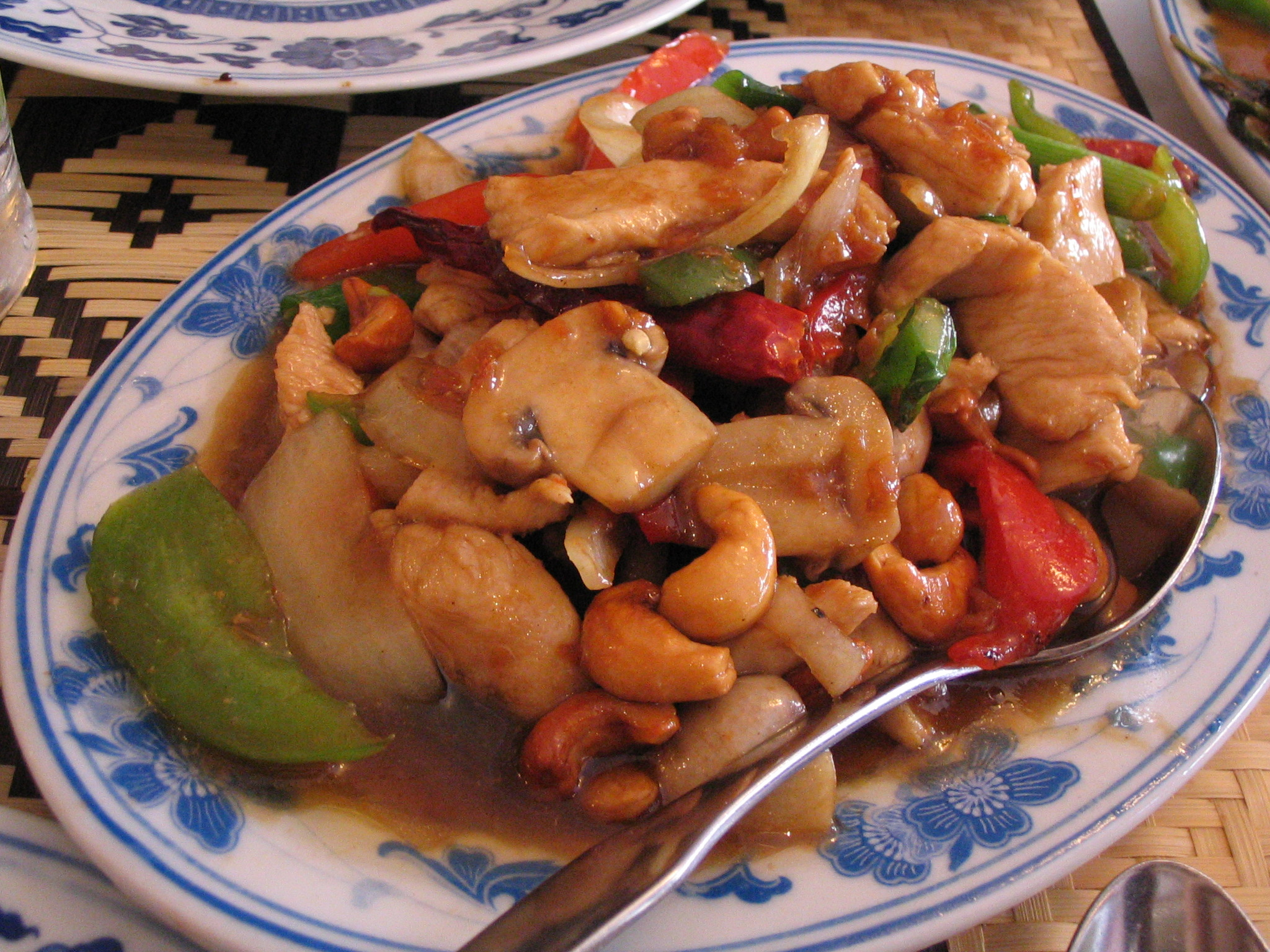
Cashew chicken, an American Chinese dish

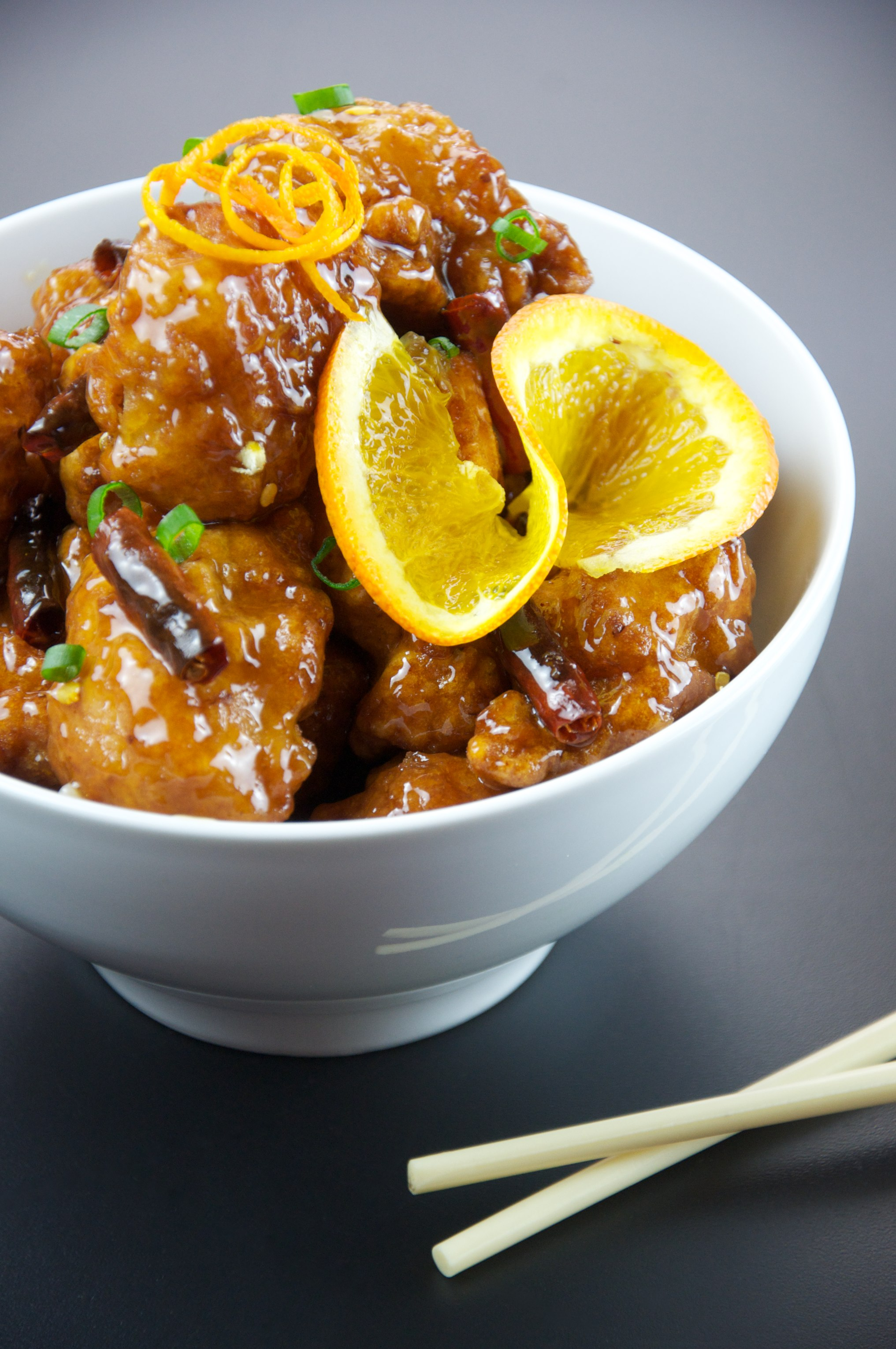
Orange chicken, another American Chinese dish

- Ayam geprek – Indonesian fried chicken dish
- Ayam goreng – Indonesian and Malay fried chicken dish
- Ayam goreng kalasan – Indonesian traditional fried chicken
- Ayam penyet – Indonesian traditional fried chicken
- Ayam pop – Indonesian chicken dish
- Backhendl – Austrian fried chicken dish
- Barberton chicken – Serbian-American fried chicken dish
- BK Chicken Fries – Fried chicken product sold by Burger King
- Buffalo wing – American dish of spicy chicken wings
- Cashew chicken – Chinese-American dish
- Chicken and chips
- Chicken and waffles – American dish
- Chicken fingers – U.S. dish of breaded and fried chicken meat
- Chicken Française – Italian-American dish
- Chicken karahi – South Asian dish
- Chicken katsu – Japanese fried chicken dish
- Chicken Kiev – Chicken dish associated with Russian and Ukrainian cuisines
- Chicken lollipop – Indian fried chicken appetizer
- Chicken Maryland – Fried chicken dish with cream sauce
- Chicken nugget – Breaded deboned chicken meat pieces
- Chicken parmigiana – Italian-American dish
- Chicken 65 – South Indian chicken dish
- Chicken tabaka – Georgian pan-fried chicken dish
- Chicken tatsuta – Japanese McDonald's burger
- Cordon bleu – Meat and cheese dish
- Coxinha – Brazilian snack
- Crispy fried chicken – Chinese dish of fried chicken
- General Tso's chicken – Deep-fried chicken dish
- Gribenes – Ashkenazi Jewish dish
- Hot chicken – Chicken dish from Nashville, Tennessee, US
- Jalfrezi – Curry dish
- Karaage – Japanese cooking technique
- KFC Original Recipe – Secret blend of ingredients used in KFC fried chicken
- Korean fried chicken – Variety of fried chicken dishes from South Korea
- Kung Pao chicken – Spicy stir-fried dish
- Laziji – Chongqing dish of deep-fried chicken with dried chilies
- Lemon chicken – Name of several dishes featuring chicken and lemon
- Milanesa – Argentine originated South American breaded cutlet dish
- Moo goo gai pan – Americanized version of a Cantonese dish
- Orange chicken – Chinese chicken dish of U.S. origin
- Padak – South Korean fried chicken dish
- Parmo – English take-away dish
- Phat kaphrao – Fried rice dish from Thailand
- Phat khing – Thai stir fry chicken and vegetables
- Piccata – Italian dish
- Popcorn chicken – Chicken dish originated from Kentucky Fried Chicken
- Pozharsky cutlet – Russian dish of breaded ground meat
- Sesame chicken – Chicken dish
- Southern fried chicken – Dish of seasoned chicken pieces that are coated and fried
- Spice bag – Fast food dish created in Ireland
- Spicy chicken sandwich – Sandwich made with chicken
- Taiwanese fried chicken – Dish in Taiwanese cuisine
- Tongdak – Korean term for fried whole chicken
- Yangnyeom chicken – Sauced Korean fried chicken variety
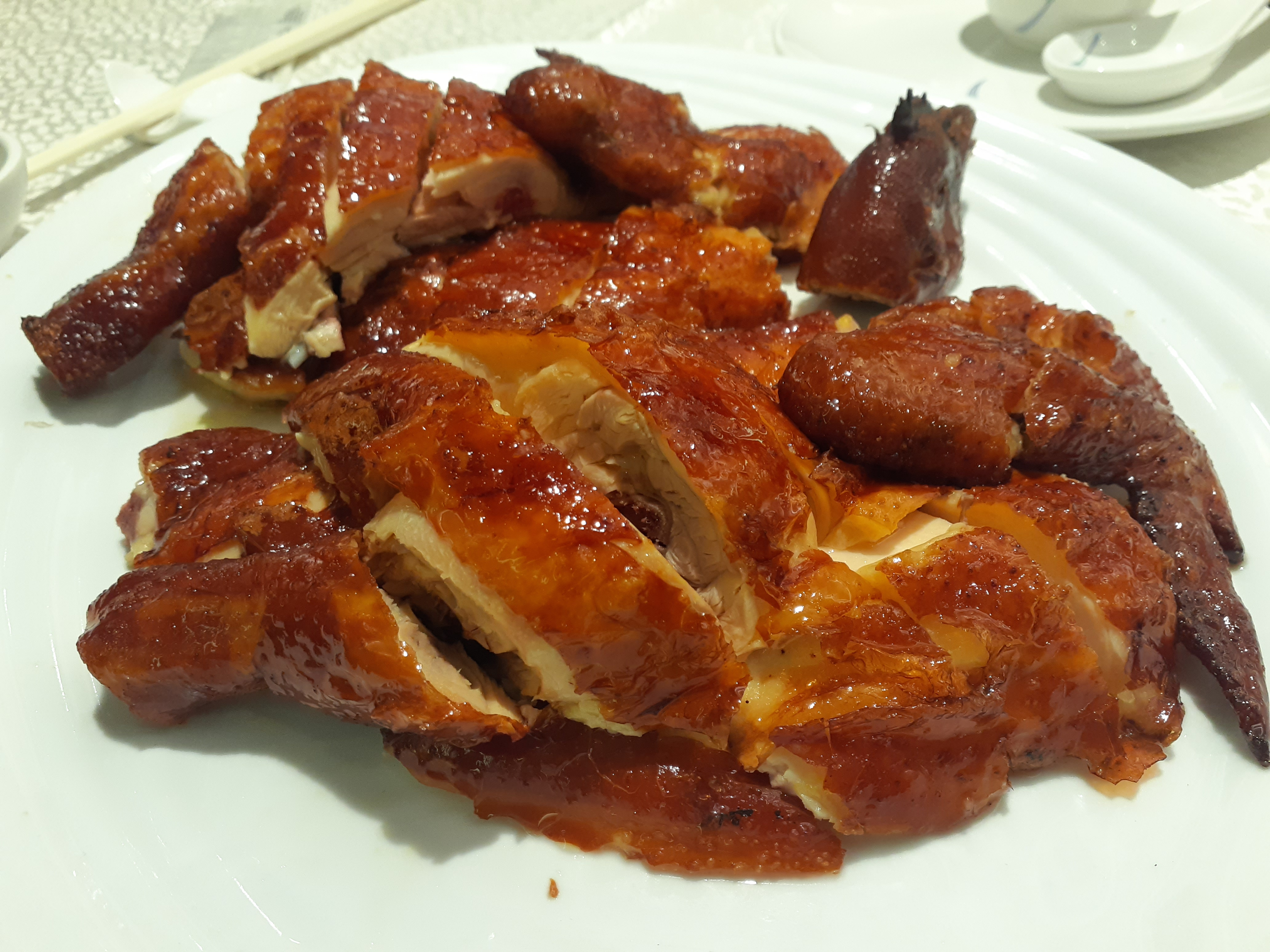
Crispy fried chicken, a Cantonese dish

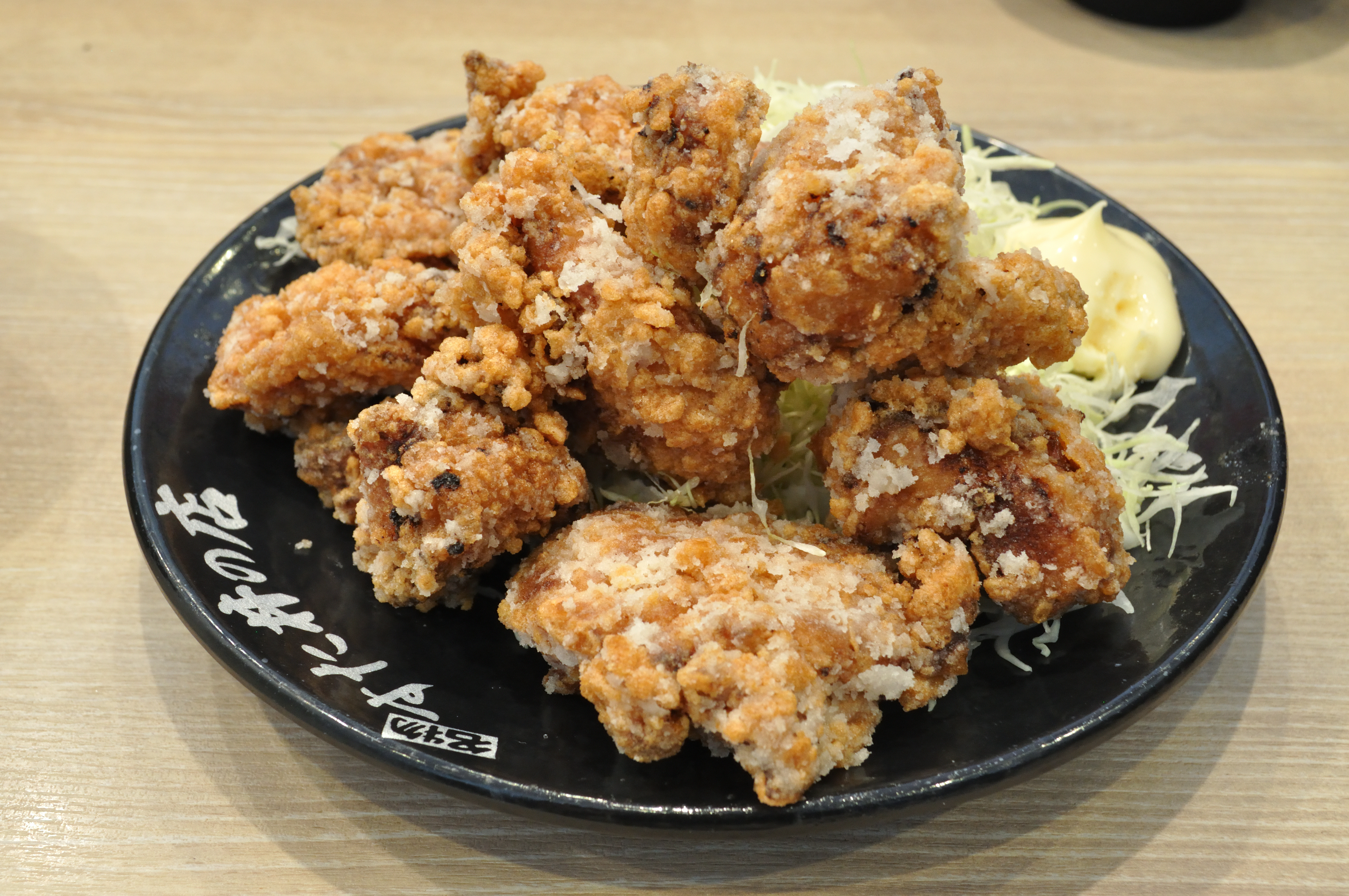
Karaage, a Japanese dish

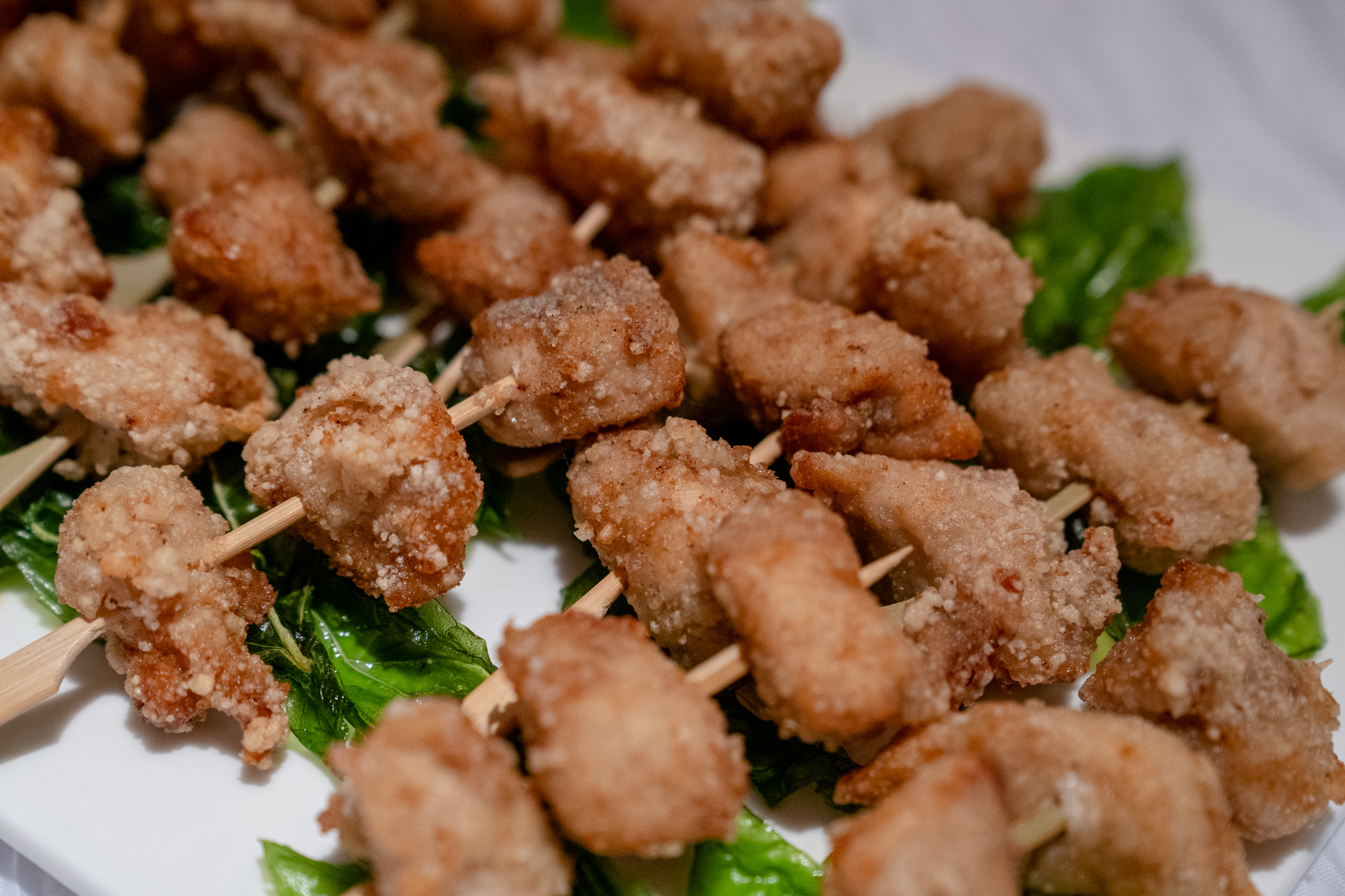
Taiwanese fried chicken

== See also ==
- Fried chicken restaurant
- List of chicken dishes
- List of deep fried foods
- List of fast-food chicken restaurants
