= Agana Shopping Center =

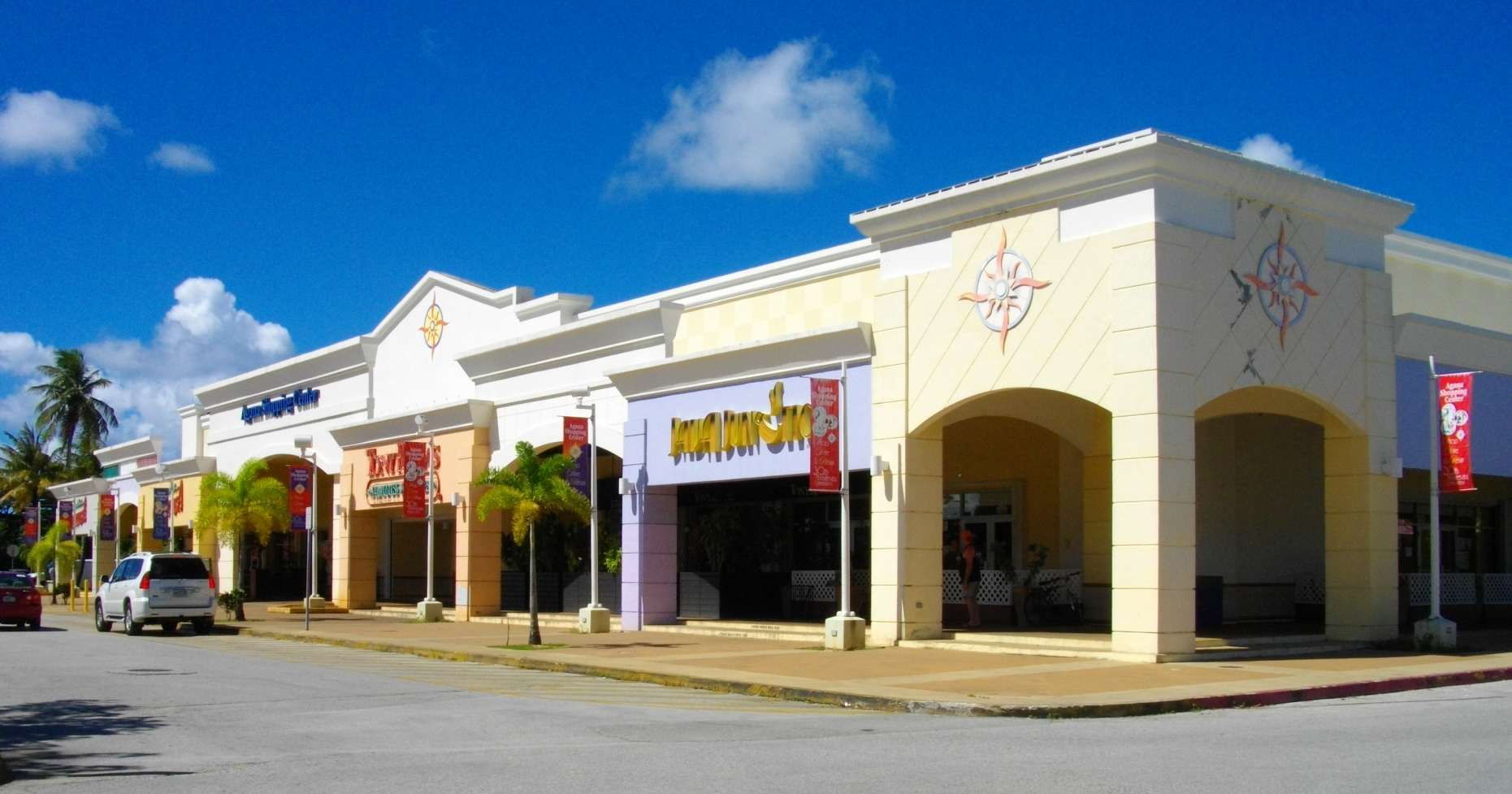
- Location: Hagåtña, Guam
- Coordinates: 13°28′15.78″N 144°45′19.44″E
- Address: 302 South Route 4 Hagåtña, Guam 96910
- Opened: 1978
- Owner: SM Prime Holdings (since 2003)
- Num. of stores: 65 (as of March 20, 2024)
- Num. of anchor tenants: 2
- Floor area: 140,000 sq ft (13,000 m^{2})
- Floors: 2
- Website: aganacenter.com

The Agana Shopping Center is a shopping mall located in Hagåtña, the capital of the United States territory of Guam. Opening in 1978, the mall is one of numerous malls on Guam. It is owned by Philippines-based retail firm SM Prime since 2003. Main competitors include Micronesia Mall in Dededo and Guam Premier Outlets in Tamuning.

The shopping center offers a mix of shops from local stores to notable chain restaurants such as Pizza Hut, Taco Bell, Panda Express, Subway, Wendy's, Pretzelmaker, Cinnabon, Chatime, Jollibee, and Vons Chicken. Local restaurants can be found throughout the mall including Dr. Kabob, Capricciosa, Sushi Rock, Poke Seven, Snowberry, Chan's Hotdog, and Fizz & Co., the only soda shop on the island. There are also Asian grocery stores, Seoul Mart and Tokyo Mart Express, which offer Korean and Japanese products.

Retail stores and services in the mall include Ross Dress for Less, SM Island, Vitamin World,Vince Jewelers, Miniso, Docomo Pacific, IT&E, Jeans Warehouse, Hair Town, Hollywood Nails, Ideal Vision Center, Express Care, Photoshoot Studio, All Ways Learning and more.

The second floor of the mall also features its Agana Marketplace, a place that includes more small local retail shops offering accessories, clothing, bags, and more.
