= List of cities and counties of South Chungcheong Province =

South Chungcheong Province is currently divided into 8 cities (si) and 7 counties (gun). The city and county names below are given in English, hangul, and hanja.

== Cities ==
- Asan (아산시; 牙山市)
- Boryeong (보령시; 保寧市)
- Cheonan (천안시; 天安市)
- Gongju (공주시; 公州市)
- Nonsan (논산시; 論山市)
- Seosan (서산시; 瑞山市)
- Gyeryong (계룡시; 鷄龍市)
- Dangjin (당진시; 唐津市)

== Counties ==
- Buyeo County (부여군; 扶餘郡)
- Cheongyang County (청양군; 青陽郡)
- Geumsan County (금산군; 錦山郡)
- Hongseong County (홍성군; 洪城郡)
- Seocheon County (서천군; 舒川郡)
- Taean County (태안군; 泰安郡)
- Yesan County (예산군; 禮山郡)

== List by population and area ==
Name	Population	Area	Population Density
Asan	287,073	542.25 km^{2} (209.36 sq mi)	529.41 /km^{2} (1,371.2 /sq mi)
Boryeong	107,346	568.22 km^{2} (219.39 sq mi)	188.655 /km^{2} (488.61 /sq mi)
Cheonan	582,753	636.45 km^{2} (245.73 sq mi)	915.9 /km^{2} (2,372 /sq mi)
Gongju	116,870	940.71 km^{2} (363.21 sq mi)	124.2 /km^{2} (322 /sq mi)
Gyeryong	43,269	60.7 km^{2} (23.4 sq mi)	712.8/km^{2} (1,846/sq mi)
Nonsan	136,356	554.82 km^{2} (214.22 sq mi)	246/km^{2} (640/sq mi)
Seosan	163,055	739.15 km^{2} (285.39 sq mi)	201.2/km^{2} (521/sq mi)
Dangjin	117,409	664.13 km^{2} (256.42 sq mi)	176.8/km^{2} (458/sq mi)
Buyeo County	95,213	624.58 km^{2} (241.15 sq mi)	152.4/km^{2} (395/sq mi)
Cheongyang County	37,194	479.57 km^{2} (185.16 sq mi)	77.6/km^{2} (201/sq mi)
Geumsan County	60,740	575.98 km^{2} (222.39 sq mi)	105.4/km^{2} (273/sq mi)
Hongseong County	89,174	443.5 km^{2} (171.2 sq mi)	201.1/km^{2} (521/sq mi)
Seocheon County	67,651	363.40 km^{2} (140.31 sq mi)	186.2/km^{2} (482/sq mi)
Taean County	63,930	504.82 km^{2} (194.91 sq mi)	126.6/km^{2} (328/sq mi)
Yesan County	100,602	543.09 km^{2} (209.69 sq mi)	185.2/km^{2} (480/sq mi)

== General information ==
Name	Sub-Divisions	Points of Interest	Image	Location	Description
Asan					
Boryeong					Boryeong is also popularly known as Daecheon.
Cheonan					
Gongju					
Nonsan					
Seosan					
Gyeryong					
Dangjin					
Buyeo County					
Cheongyang County					
Geumsan County					
Hongseong County					
Seocheon County					
Taean County					
Yesan County					

== Former divisions ==
Name	Sub-Divisions	Points of Interest	Image	Location	Description
Yeongi County					Since July 2012, the county has dissolved to form a part of modern-day Sejong City.

== See also ==
- South Chungcheong Province
