= Bonchon Chicken =

Korean fried chicken restaurant chain

Bonchon Chicken 본촌치킨 本村치킨

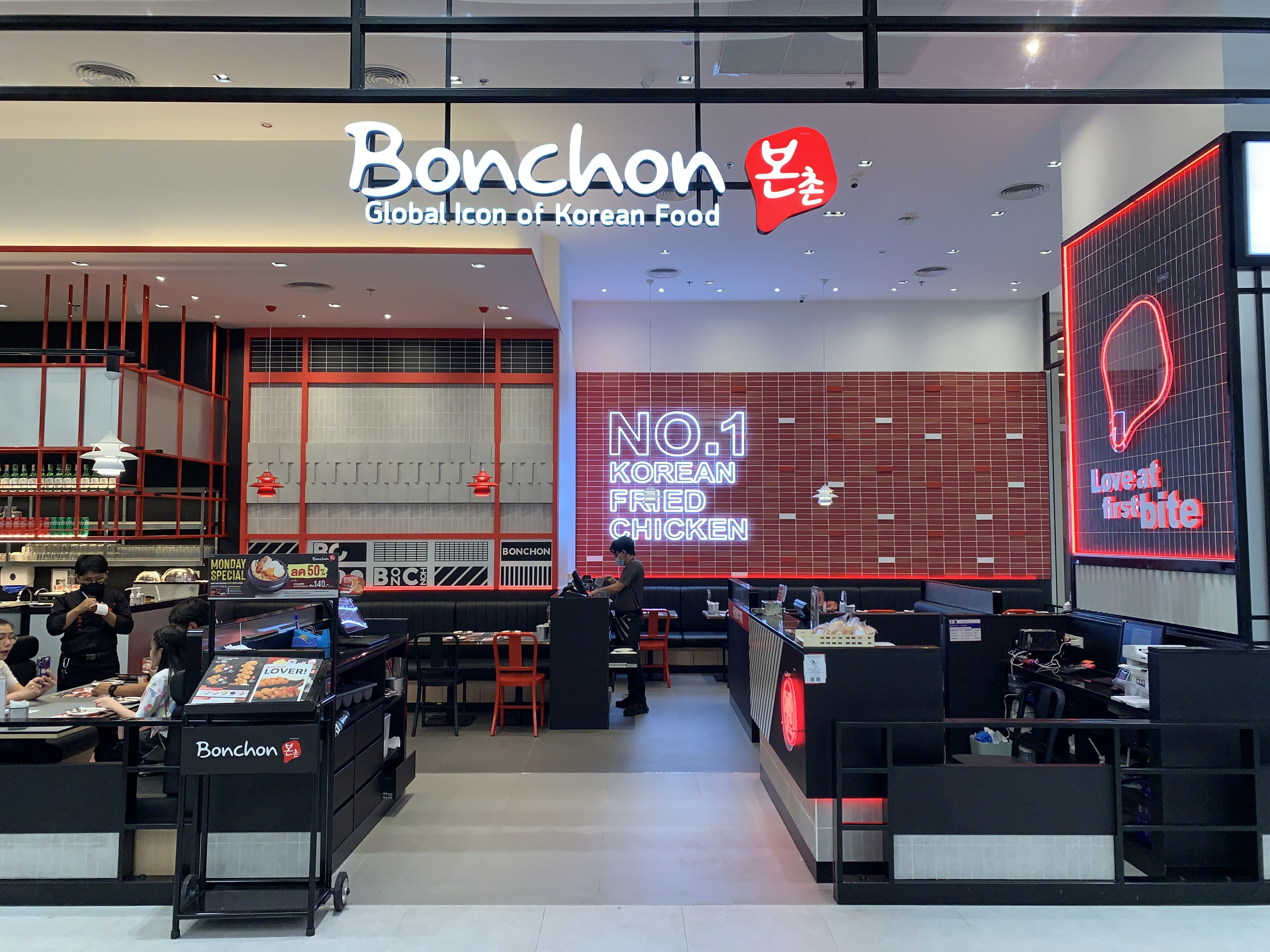
- A Bonchon Chicken branch in Bangkok, Thailand
- Type: Subsidiary
- Industry: Restaurants franchising
- Founded: 2002; 24 years ago Busan, South Korea
- Founder: Jinduk Seo
- Headquarters: Dallas, Texas
- Products: Korean fried chicken
- Website: www.bonchon.com

Bonchon International Inc., operating under the name Bonchon Chicken (Korean: 본촌치킨; Hanja: 本村치킨; pronounced [pɔntɕʰɔn], which means "my hometown"), is an international fast food chain that specializes in Korean fried chicken. The company was founded in 2002 by Jinduk Seo in Busan, South Korea, and currently has its headquarters in Dallas, Texas.

Bonchon stopped its South Korean restaurant activities in 2016 and switched to a pure export-oriented franchise. At present, there are around 500 restaurants located in over ten different countries and regions. Among the most significant markets are the US, Philippines, and Thailand.

The company has been majority owned by South Korea-based private equity firm VIG Partners since December 2018. Since then, the brand moved its global headquarters from South Korea to the US, launched new fast-casual dining formats, and put the business up for auction in 2026. The chain came under public criticism about premium pricing and labor issues.

== History ==
The Bonchon Chicken restaurant began in 2002 in Busan, South Korea, founded by Jinduk Seo. The name "Bonchon" translates from Korean to "my hometown". The brand's initial development focused on the South Korean chimaek (fried chicken paired with beer) market.

Due to domestic market saturation, the company transitioned to an international franchise model. The first U.S. location was opened in Fort Lee, New Jersey and later spread to other US locations. In the Southeast Asian market, the company utilized master franchise partnerships, beginning with the Scotland Food Group to establish fast-casual locations in the Philippines in 2010. Similar expansion models were applied in Thailand, Cambodia, and Vietnam. As of 2026, the franchise operated in over ten countries.

In December 2018, the South Korean private equity fund VIG Partners acquired a majority 55 percent stake in the company for 60 billion won, while the founding family retained the remaining 45 percent. In 2021, Bonchon moved its global headquarters to Dallas, Texas. In March 2026, VIG Partners initiated a formal auction process of the brand through investment banking firm William Blair. In August of that year it was announced that Serruya Private Equity and Minor Food Group would purchase the brand from VIG Partners and the founding family. Serruya will own and operate the business in the Americas and Minor Food will take over the business outside America.

== Operations ==
Bonchon operates an approximate total of 500 stores in over ten different nations and territories. Bonchon operates across the North America, Asia, the Middle East, Oceania, and Europe. Its densest markets are currently the Philippines, the United States, and Thailand. The United States is the company's primary market, generating the majority of its worldwide revenue, with more than 150 stores spread out across its major cities such as New York, Los Angeles, Chicago, and Dallas. Bonchon stopped all retailing in South Korea by the end of 2016.

A Bonchon Chicken location in Angeles City, Philippines

Apart from the US, Bonchon has expanded outside its borders mainly through franchising deals. For instance, in the Philippines, the chain entered the market in 2010 through a master deal with Scotland Food Group, resulting in 180 franchise restaurants based on the localized family-oriented fast-casual concept. In Thailand, the operations are run by Minor International and operates over 110 Bonchon locations, relying on digital delivery systems.

As part of efforts to diversify the format, in 2023, Bonchon started to introduce alternative store types such as ghost kitchens, as well as locations at hotels and airports.

Bonchon has its main headquarters in Dallas, Texas. The company's international business strategy is managed by Bryan Shin, who acts as both the international chief executive officer (CEO) and group chief financial officer (CFO). Early in 2024, Suzie Tsai took charge as the CEO of the U.S. division of the firm.

== Products ==
The master franchisee for the international market has been permitted to make alterations to the menu offerings according to regional preferences to cater to customers seeking a full meal. Examples of menu offerings available in the Philippines include the Creamy Rose Tteokbokki, Sizzling Bibimbowl, and Cafe Koreano (coffee and snow ice). Similarly, Thai locations operated by Minor Food Group have adapted their offerings by introducing single-serving meal sizes alongside regional dishes like spicy seafood soup.

== Advertising ==
In Asian markets, Bonchon relies on its own brand ambassadors to target the younger generation of consumers, especially the Generation Z. For instance, in Thailand, the brand’s master franchisee, Minor Food Group, engaged Thai actor and singer Vachirawit Chivaaree as its first-ever brand ambassador to increase youth market penetration.

An empirical study conducted by sociologists at Chulalongkorn University in 2022 regarding Generation Z consumers in Thailand revealed that although the target audience held positive perceptions about Bonchon as comfort food, they did not relate the brand with broader Korean pop culture. According to the research, past advertising efforts had emphasized the product quality more than the lifestyle aspects of the brand.

Bonchon uses mobile apps and social media such as Facebook to promote its services, release menu updates, and facilitate quick ordering.

== Controversies and criticism ==
=== Pricing disputes ===
Bonchon in South Korea, as well as the fried chicken industry in general, has come under public and government criticism for practicing shrinkflation by reducing the size of products while simultaneously increasing their prices. In light of the negative public perception, it was stipulated that all South Korean chicken restaurants must inform customers of the pre-cooking weight of their chicken. Because of high prices, the product has been subjected to claims from consumers about its serving sizes. Moreover, in 2024, the Thai branch of Bonchon removed a 10% mandatory service charge after facing consumer complaints.

=== Labor disputes ===
Employees at the Dinkytown branch of Bonchon, located near the University of Minnesota in Minneapolis, claimed that the employer was stealing their wages by unlawfully re-appropriating their tips to kitchen workers. This dispute led the Restaurant Opportunities Center of Minnesota to get involved. In October 2019, Bonchon paid more than $10,000 in back wages, tips, and damages to the former workers following a settlement with the Minneapolis Labor Standards Enforcement Division.

== See also ==
- List of chicken restaurants
- List of Korean restaurants
- Hallyu
