= Yangnyeom chicken =

Sauced Korean fried chicken variety

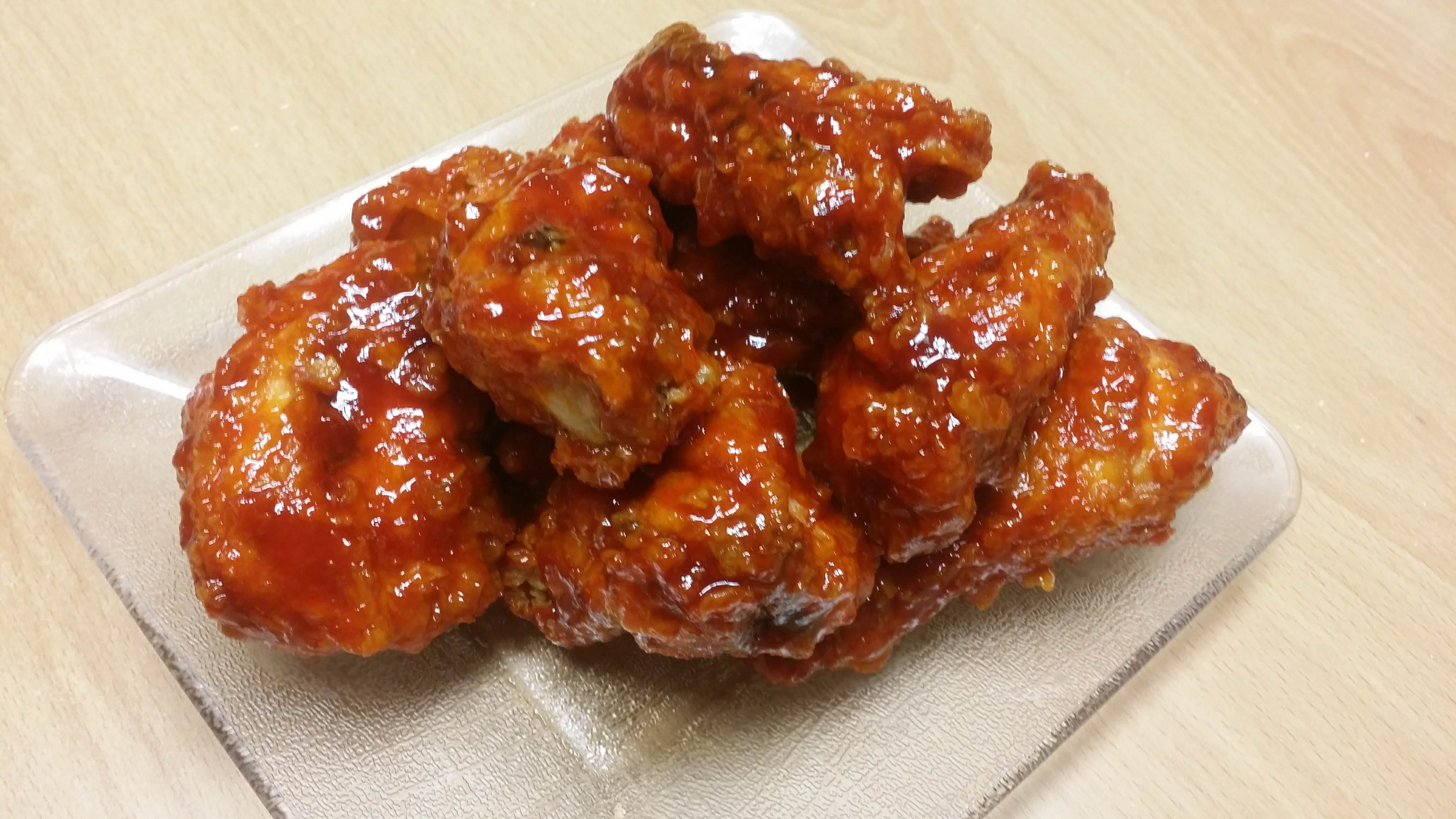
- Yangnyeom chicken from BHC chicken franchise

Korean name
- Hangul: 양념치킨
- RR: yangnyeom chikin
- MR: yangnyŏm ch'ik'in

Alternate name
- Hangul: 양념통닭
- RR: yangnyeom tongdak
- MR: yangnyŏm t'ongdak

Yangnyeom chicken (Korean: 양념치킨) is a variety of Korean fried chicken seasoned with a sweet and spicy sauce of gochujang, garlic, sugar, and other spices. It is often eaten as anju, food consumed while drinking, in South Korea.

Julia Moskin, writing for The New York Times, called yangnyeom chicken "the apotheosis of the Korean style" of fried chicken.

== Etymology ==
The word chicken (치킨) in South Korea refers to fried chicken, and sometimes roasted chicken; yangnyeom (양념) is Korean for "seasoned". Therefore, yangnyeom chicken (양념치킨) means "seasoned fried chicken" in Korean. Unseasoned fried chicken is called dakgogi-twigim (닭고기 튀김; chicken meat fritter) or fried chicken (프라이드치킨). Outside Korea, yangnyeom chicken is known as Korean fried chicken.

== History ==
The initial developer of yangnyeom chicken, Yoon Jonggye, devised it at his restaurant in Daegu, Gyeongbuk called "Mek-si-can" (맥시칸, not to be confused with similar copycat brands 멕시칸 or 멕시카나), after analysing the leftover food of his customers.

He noticed that the regular fried chicken crust was too crunchy and scratched the palates of customers, so he coated the fried chicken with a sauce to soften the crust, creating the recipe for yangnyeom chicken. However, it was commercialised by Yang Heekwon, an employee of Mr Yoon, who was inspired by the recipe and founded the restaurant chain Pelicana Chicken.

Initially, customers were unwilling to buy the yangnyeom chicken. Pelicana has then started to give free food samples to customers as part of the marketing campaign, which successfully increased the sales in just two months. A jingle in a Pelicana commercial featuring popular comedian Choi Yang-rak further contributed to the popularity of the dish.

The naming and trademark status of yangnyeom was argued in the South Korean courts in the 1990s, culminating in a 1997 ruling by the Supreme Court.

Fried chicken became popular in South Korea in the 1970s; the first fried chicken restaurant in South Korea, Lim's Chicken, opened in 1977. Yangnyeom chicken restaurants gained in popularity and have been opened in other countries, including the United States, Australia, Taiwan, China, the Philippines, Malaysia, Myanmar, Singapore, and Vietnam.

== Preparation and serving ==
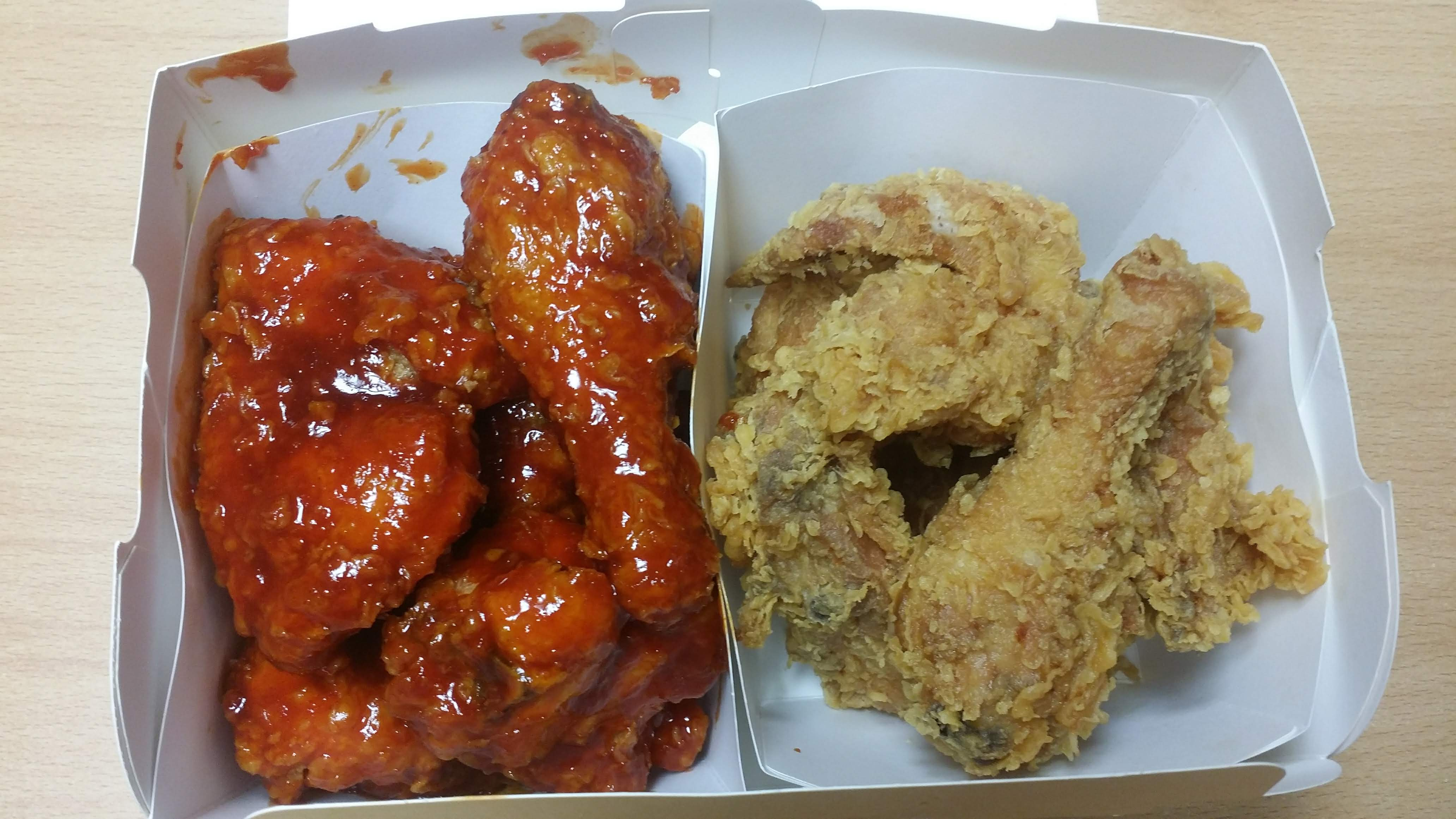
Half yangnyeom chicken, half fried chicken from BHC chicken franchise

A chicken is cut into pieces, or boneless chicken into bite-size pieces, and seasoned with salt and powdered black pepper. Sometimes cheonju (rice wine) or curry powder is added to get rid of the strong poultry smell. The seasoned chicken is coated in batter made with eggs and starch powder and deep-fried twice, with the resulting crust "thin, crackly and almost transparent," according to Moskin. The chicken is then coated with sauce. Sometimes it is sprinkled with chopped peanuts, sesame seeds, chopped garlic, or sliced green onions. Pickled radish is a common accompaniment.

The sauce is made of starch syrup or strawberry jam, ketchup, gochujang, dark soy sauce, minced garlic, ground red pepper, brown sugar, and sometimes other seasonings and boiled briefly to thicken. Commercial sauces are available.

Coating in sauce causes the crust of yangnyeom chicken to get soggy very fast; consuming it immediately after purchase is recommended unless one prefers the moist crust to the crispy one. Yangnyeom chicken tends to be popular among those who do not enjoy the oily taste of fried chicken. On the other hand, those who may not enjoy the sweetish taste and deep-fried coating that gets soggy very fast prefer eating fried chicken. There are people who want both styles of chicken; the order of "banban" (반반; half-and-half), meaning "half yangnyeom chicken, half fried chicken", is common in Korea.

The addition of the sauce makes yangnyeom chicken slightly more expensive to prepare than fried chicken. Some restaurants have attempted to cut costs by deep-frying chicken in old cooking oil or using low-quality or expired meat, using the sauce to obscure the lower quality of the completed dish.

== Dietary information ==
According to the Korea Consumer Agency, a whole yangnyeom chicken has 2,700–2,900 calories, more than a fried chicken, because approximately 1,000 calories are added by the sauce.

== See also ==
- Buffalo wing
- Crispy fried chicken
- Nashville hot chicken
- Padak
