= Vons Chicken =

Korean fried chicken chain restaurant

- Industry: Fast food restaurants
- Founded: 2007; 18 years ago in South Korea
- Area served: South Korea, United States, Guam, China, Vietnam, Guatemala, Australia, Cambodia
- Website: vonschickenfnb.com (U.S. homepage) vonschicken.co.kr (South Korean homepage)

Vons Chicken (Korean: 본스치킨) is a South Korean multinational Korean fried chicken chain restaurant. The restaurant was founded in 2007 in South Korea, and by 2024 had locations in the United States, Vietnam, China, Guam, Guatemala, Australia, and Cambodia. In the United States, by 2024 its locations were concentrated in Hawaii and the West Coast. As of 2024, its website reports to having 91 locations in South Korea.

The restaurant serves various Korean fried chicken styles, including yangnyeom chicken, honey butter chicken, and cheddar chicken. It has both fried and baked chicken. Other Korean snack foods, such as mandu (dumplings), kimchi fried rice, tteokbokki (spicy rice cakes) are also sold.

The first Vons in California opened in Sunnyvale in 2014. By 2020 it had more than a dozen locations in the Bay Area. It first entered San Diego in 2020. It first entered Boise, Idaho in 2020. The restaurant had a location in Aurora, Colorado beginning in 2019, but that location closed by 2023.

The restaurant has received praise from food reviewers.
