= Pelicana Chicken =

South Korean fried chicken restaurant franchise

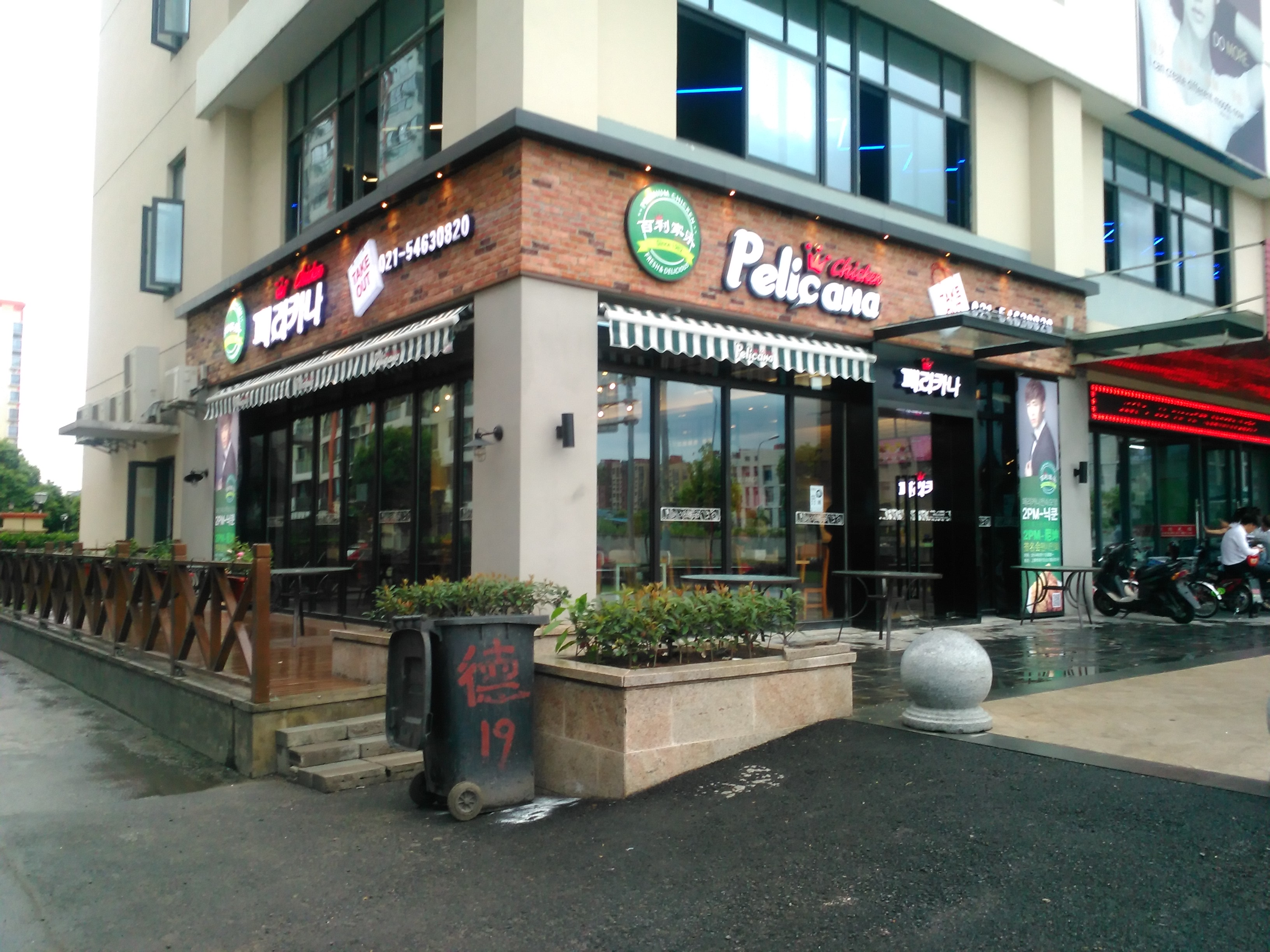

Restaurant information
- Food type: Fried chicken
- Other locations: South Korea, China, Canada, United States

Pelicana Chicken (Korean: 페리카나 치킨) is a Korean fried chicken chain started in 1982. Its headquarters are in Gyeryong, South Korea. As of 2014, Yang Hee-Kweon is the CEO.

As of 2013, it had over 2,000 locations in South Korea and also has locations outside of South Korea. Pelicana Chicken Malaysia held its "soft opening" on January 4, 2013, and the company planned to hold the grand opening of the first full store in July 2013.

The chain expanded to the United States in 2014, and has established locations in New York, New Jersey, Pennsylvania, Virginia and (Seattle) Washington.

Pelicana has also opened in China. In 2022 it opened its first location in Canada, in Toronto.

Pelicana chicken started with its gochujang yangyeom chicken. This fried chicken dressed in a sauce made with gochujang, garlic and onions drew a large crowd. There is an origin story that states that the founder Yang Hee Kwon received the secret recipe from Yoon Jong Gye and started the business, but this has been found to be false. Yang Hee Gwon developed everything themselves and started the chain shop in Daejeon not Daegu. There are cases where a Supreme Court ruling for seasoned chicken is made, however patents were not the focus of the ruling but rather the issue of trademark rights.

In 1982, leadership had been moved over to Mr Na, and just one year after, 500 branches were opened and thus in 1984, Pelicana was given trademark rights.

== History ==
- 20 March 1981: The first Pelicana franchise was opened.
- 27 April 1982: Leadership was transferred to Mr Na in the Gajang-dong, Daejeon branch.
- 3 November 1984: Pelicana was given trademark rights.
- 10 January 1985: The first factory in Gasuwon-dong, Daejeon was completed
- 10 June 1985: Chain headquarters were established in Daemyeong-dong, Daegu.
- 25 October 1985: Buto is registered as a limited company.
- 2 April 1989: Seoul headquarters established.
- 15 January 1990: Daegu chain headquarters were expanded to Sinam-Dong.
- 24 April 1990: The second factory was completed in Duma-myeon, Nonsan.
- 26 July 1990: Fix Co., Ltd is officially established as a limited company.
- 30 October 1990: Seoul headquarters office is set up in Dunchon-dong, Gangdong District, Seoul.
- 10 November 1990: Saipan headquarters established in Chalan Kanoa
- 1 February 1992: PELICANA U.S.A INC established in the Los Angeles, California, United States
- 1 March 1992: Chain headquarters moved to Seoul
- 18 October 1992: Pelicana's 10th year anniversary.
- 10 August 1990: Established in Shanghai, China as a limited company.
- 10 November 1995: Chain headquarters and the office headquarters are integrated in Gasuwon-dong, Daejeon.
- 27 August 1996: Pelicana Farming Association established in Yesan County, South Chungcheong Province.
- 14 January 2000: Direct Holdings company established in Boryeong, South Chungcheong Province.
- 3 March 2000: Sauce production factory expanded to Duma-myeon, Gyeryong, South Chungcheong Province.
- 18 October 2002: Pelicana's 20th anniversary.
- 27 April 2007: Chain headquarters expanded in Duma-myeon, Gyeryong, South Chungcheong Province.
- 24 May 2010: Official blog created.
- 1 May 2011: Official Twitter created.
- 1 August 2011: Pelicana Corporate Identity (CI) and emblem production.
- 29 May 2012: Expansion to South-East Asia and Oceania.
- 18 October 2012: Pelicana 30th year anniversary.
- 24 August 2012: Official Facebook page created.
- 2 October 2017: Pelicana attended a 2017 Korean Ground Forces Festival in Gyeryong, named the Gyeryong County Military Culture Festival in the Large Food Zone.
- 18 October 2022: Pelicana 40th anniversary.

== Franchise List ==
Franchise Name	Location	Est.
Wonju	Gwanseol-dong, Wonju City, Gangwon-do	3 November 1984
Daegu	Dongseong-ro, Daegu	20 May 1985
Daejeon	Wolpyeong-dong, Daejeon	15 July 1985
Gwangju	Joongheung-dong, Gwangju	4 November 1985
Jeju	Donam-dong, Jeju City, Jeju	6 November 1986
Bucheon	Shimgok-dong, Wonmin-gu, Bucheon City, Gyeongi-do	10 July 1987
Busan	Geoje-dong, Yeonje District, Busan	30 November 1987
Yeongju	Yeongju, North Gyeongsang Province	27 March 1988
Seoul	Seongne-dong, Seoul	2 April 1989
Incheon	Guwol-dong, Namdong District, Incheon	1 September 1989
Seongnam	Hadaewon-dong, Jungwon District, Seongnam, Gyeonggi Province	1 August 1990
Suwon	Hwaseong, Gyeonggi	1 September 1991
Chungcheong	Gasuwon-dong, Seo District, Daejeon	1 August 1998
Jeonbok	Iksan, Jeonbok	1 July 2000

== Subsidiaries ==
- Buto Corporation: Golf Up

== Head office and Subsidiary location ==
- Head Office: 77 Wangdae-ro, Dumamyeon, Chungcheongnam-do, South Korea.
- Gilheung Subsidiary: 9 Giheungdanji-ro, 24Beon-gil, Giheung District, Yongin, South Korea.

== See also ==
- List of Korean restaurants
- Yangyeom Chicken
