= Chimaek =

Korean fried chicken served with beer

치맥 Chimaek
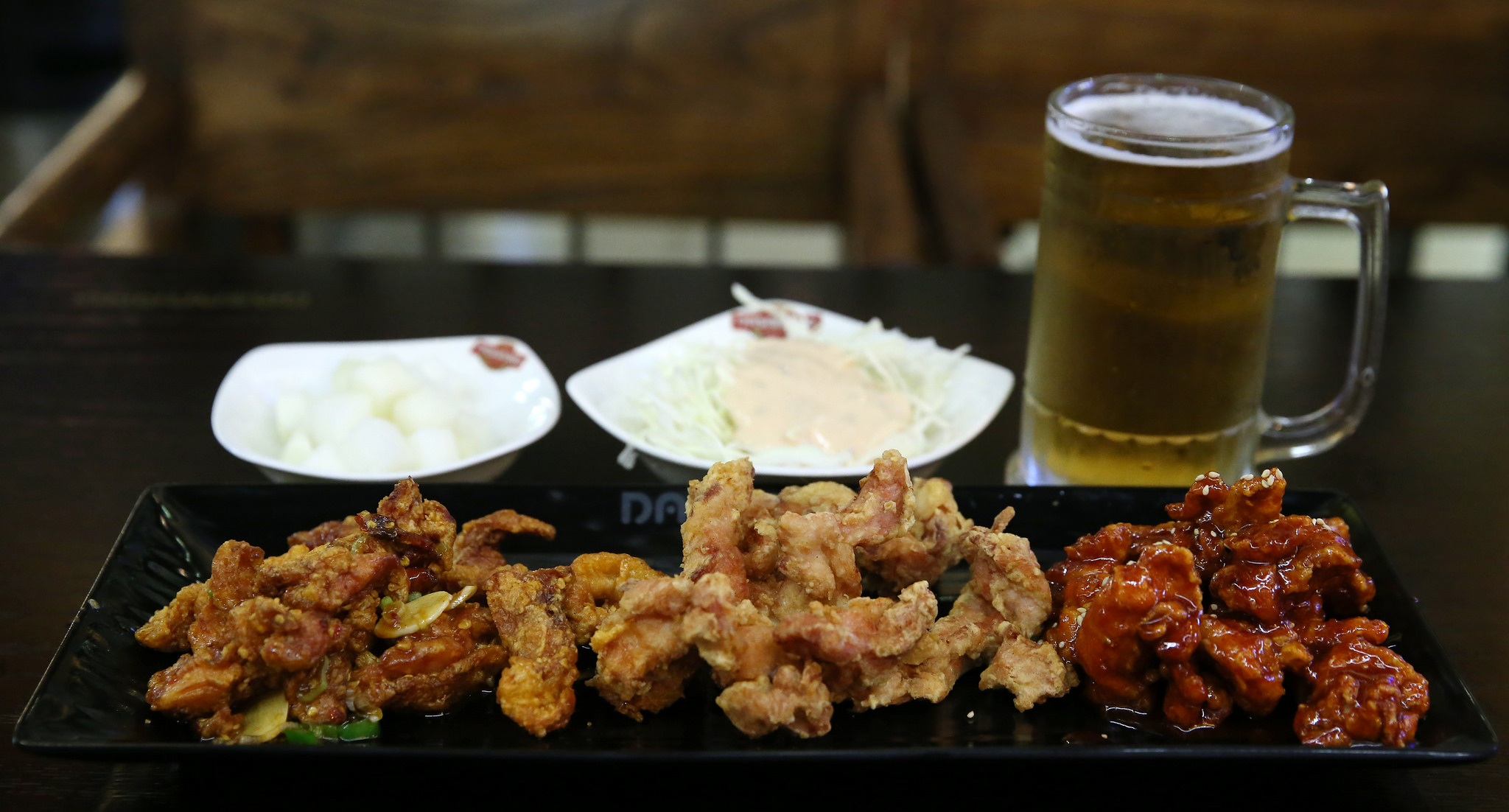
- A typical chimaek combination
- Course: Main course
- Place of origin: South Korea
- Associated cuisine: South Korean cuisine
- Invented: 1970s
- Main ingredients: Korean fried chicken, beer

Korean name
- Hangul: 치맥
- RR: chimaek
- MR: ch'imaek

Original phrase
- Hangul: 치킨 맥주
- RR: chikin maekju
- MR: ch'ik'in maekchu

Chimaek (치맥; from Korean chikin 'fried chicken' and maekju 'beer') is a pairing of fried chicken (either plain huraideu or spicy yangnyeom) and beer, served as anju (English: food with alcohol) in the evening in many South Korean restaurants, including a number of specialized chains.

== Origin and popularization ==
While chimaek as we know it today did not exist in the Joseon era, historical records suggest that similar individual components did. The 1459 cookbook Sangayorok (산가요록) recorded Pogye, a stir-fried chicken dish—not deep-fried—and also mentioned maekju, a barley-based makgeolli somewhat analogous to beer, which shares the same name (maekju) in modern Korean. These elements were not combined as chimaek and were eventually forgotten until rediscovered in the late 2010s. Modern chimaek is believed to have been invented in late 20th century, but it is hard to pinpoint the exact time and place. From the roasted chicken that appeared in the early 1960s to the spicy chicken that was adapted to meet Korean tastes, South Korea has imported and developed a growing variety of chicken dishes. While chicken was gaining popularity, a new draft beer which appeared in the 1970s was also becoming very popular, and it became common for the two to be combined as a single menu item. Moreover, the 2002 Korea–Japan World Cup shed more light on the chimaek phenomenon, and the dish has also had a significant impact on Korean drinking culture. Today, fried chicken is one of the most popular dishes in Korea. It's so popular that Koreans created the word Chi-neunim, which is a compound word of chicken and God Haneunim in Korean.

Chicken production increased 13 times as the nation's economy grew. With the introduction of cooking oil in Korea in 1971, chicken and oil were plentiful, which created an environment where people could eat more chicken. At this time, chicken and beer were sold together, which eventually led to the creation of chimaek. In the 1970s, manufacturing workers paid 3,400 South Korean won per chicken, but the price of a boiled chicken was ₩2,500, and 500 cc (18 imp fl oz; 17 US fl oz) of beer was ₩450.

In 1977, the chicken brand Rims Chicken was founded. It sold fried chicken cut into four pieces, which became especially popular during the Christmas season.

The word chicken and beer were not used in conjunction until 2002 with the Korea–Japan World Cup. Public parks would often have large screens to watch the games, and people would dress in red (the colour and nickname of the home team) and gather together to cheer for the World Cup, while eating chicken and drinking beer. The number of chicken restaurants increased from around 10,000 to 25,000 after the World Cup.

Chimaek Street is planned to be built in Gimpo, South Korea. There is a prospect that various chicken restaurants will be gathered in one place and that world beer and various kinds of chicken will be a specialty of Gimpo.

There are many chimaek festivals in Korea, including the Seoul Chimaek Festival which is held in mid-October in downtown Seoul. It is an event to promote Korean food culture abroad by combining chicken and beer. In Daegu, a chimaek festival was held in 2013. In 2013, a chimaek festival in Ningbo, China, drew some 400,000 visitors in its first three days.

== Sports ==
Chimaek is popular choice for people watching sports events such as World Cup and Asian Cup Especially, Convenience stores and fried chicken franchises enjoying a busy season during the World Cup.

== Outside Korea ==
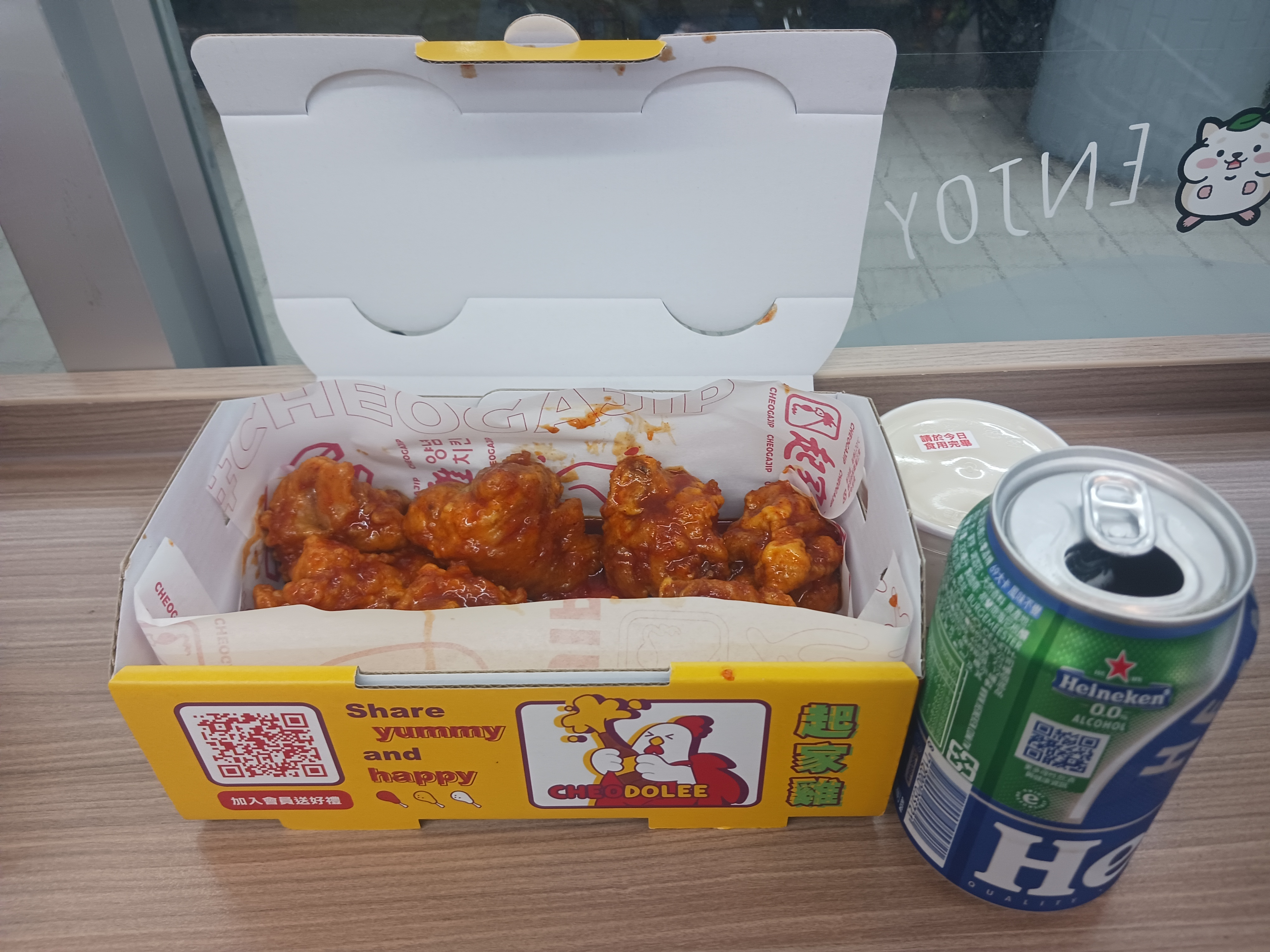
A Cheogajip fried chicken and a Heineken 0.0 beer can. Photographed in Taiwan

=== China ===
Chimaek is also popular in China because of the popular drama My Love From the Star, in which Cheon Song-i, the heroine, said "A snowy day is just perfect for our Chimaek time ..."; which triggered the phenomenon. Specialty chicken shops have been more numerous in China. Uploading pictures of oneself holding a chicken in one hand and a beer in the other on social networks became a trend.

Since December 2014, Chinese people have been willing to wait an average of three hours in front of a Korean-brand chimaek shop to enjoy the food. At the time of the drama's airing, thousands of "Chicken Mac sets" were sold in Hangzhou, and Lotte Mart in China offered a 25 percent discount for a chicken and six cans of Tsingtao beer.

=== United States ===
The 2023 Oakland's Annual Chimaek Festival was held for the first time in Oakland, California.

== Restaurants ==
Demand for specialty chicken shops increased with the growing demands for chicken and beer. As of March 2014, Korea had 192 chicken franchise companies. About 10% of companies are known for unique recipes.

== See also ==
- List of chicken dishes
- Anju (food)
