= Samsung Lions Ballpark =

Training ground in South Korea

- Interactive map of Samsung Lions Ballpark
- Location: Jillyang, Gyeongsan, North Gyeongsang Province, South Korea
- Coordinates: 35°51′53.2″N 128°48′20.1″E
- Owner: Samsung Group
- Operator: Samsung Lions
- Capacity: 1,165
- Surface: Natural grass
- Field size: Left Field – 98 metres (322 ft); Right Field – 98 metres (322 ft); Center Field – 125 metres (410 ft)

Construction
- Opened: 1992

Tenant
- Samsung Lions (KBO)

Samsung Lions Ballpark is a ballpark in Gyeongsan, North Gyeongsang Province, South Korea. It serves as the training ground for the Samsung Lions.
