= Gyeryong =

City in South Chungcheong Province, South Korea

Coordinates: 36°16′29″N 127°14′56″E

- Municipal City
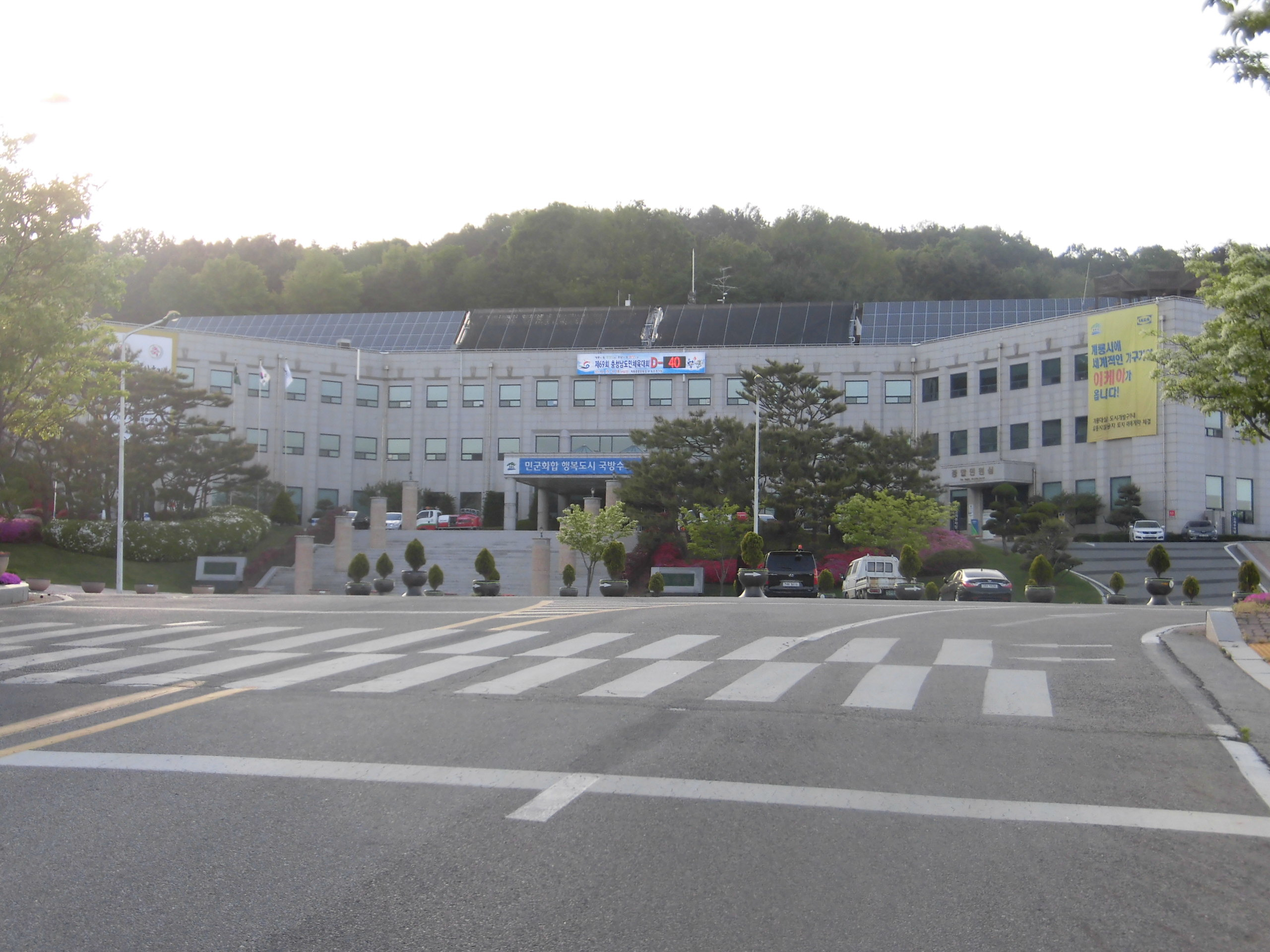
- Gyeryong City Hall

- Flag Emblem

- Location in South Korea
- Country: South Korea
- Region: Hoseo
- Administrative divisions: 3 myeon, 1 dong

Area
  - Total: 60.7 km^{2} (23.4 sq mi)

Population (September 2024)
  - Total: 46,687
  - Density: 704/km^{2} (1,820/sq mi)
  - Dialect: Chungcheong

Korean name
- Hangul: 계룡시
- Hanja: 鷄龍市
- RR: Gyeryong-si
- MR: Kyeryong-si

Gyeryong (Korean: 계룡; Korean pronunciation: [kje.ɾjoŋ]) is a city in southeastern South Chungcheong Province, South Korea. The incumbent mayor is Lee Eung-woo. The city was created in 2003 after being split from Nonsan.

Gyeryongdae, a large military complex that serves as the headquarters of the Republic of Korea Armed Forces, is located on Gyeryong's outskirts. Due to the city's proximity to Gyeryongdae, approximately half of its inhabitants are connected to the military as service personnel and their dependents or civilian employees. The city also hosts major South Korean and international military conferences. From 1989 to 1993, the military headquarters were relocated from several locations in Seoul to a more spacious and newly-built integrated complex. The Army and Air Force headquarters were first moved to Gyeryongdae in 1989, followed by the Navy headquarters four years later.

The nearby Mount Gyeryong is considered to have the most qi (spiritual energy) of any mountain in the country and is the heart of Gyeryongsan National Park. As of September 2024, the city's population was 46,687.

== Modern history ==
Gyeryong is one of the nation's newest cities outside of the Seoul Metropolitan Area. It was established as a city in 2003 following a split from Nonsan.

In 1896, Gyeryong and its vicinity were called Yeonsan County. During Japan's occupation of Korea, it was incorporated into Nonsan and later chosen as a military site. In 1989, Gyeryongdae, South Korea's military headquarters, was relocated to Gyeryong. In 1991, the city was designated a special area by the president. On June 30, 2003, the National Assembly passed a bill establishing Gyeryong and Gyeryong was officially designated as a city six months later.

Among older residents, the area of Gyeryong is known as Shindoan. Gyeryong is also considered a satellite city of Daejeon due to its geographical proximity.

== Economy ==
Pelicana Chicken has its headquarters in the city.

Due to Gyeryongdae's proximity, the Republic of Korea Armed Forces and Ministry of National Defense are major employers.

== Transportation ==
=== Trains ===
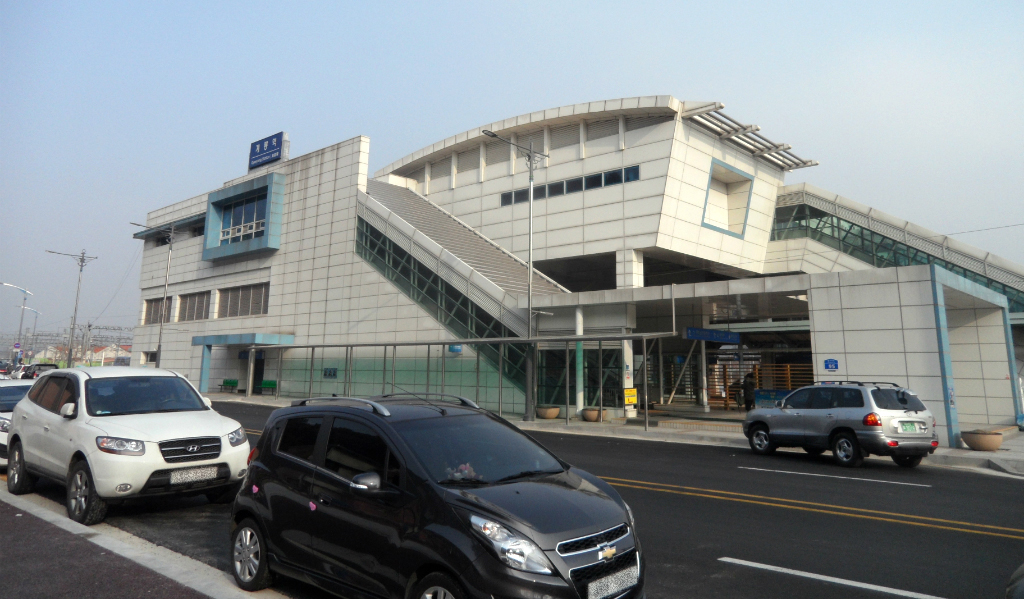
Gyeryong station

The Honam Line goes through the Gyeryong station east to west. The station receives service from KTX five times a day and also receives frequent service from Saemaeul-ho and Mugunghwa-ho trains.

=== Roads ===
The Honam Expressway Branch passes through the city, exiting through Gyeryong IC. National Route 1 and National Route 4 pass through the city center.

== Sister city ==
- Jeungpyeong County, South Korea
- Havana, Cuba

== See also ==
- List of cities in South Korea
- Geography of South Korea
- Military of South Korea
