= Vitamin World =

American retail company

- Type: Private
- Industry: Retail
- Founded: 1976
- Headquarters: Great River, New York, United States
- Number of locations: over 60 locations (July 2020)
- Products: Nutritional Supplements
- Owner: Feihe International, Inc.
- Website: www.vitaminworld.com

Vitamin World USA Corporation is a global retailer of vitamins and nutritional supplements and is headquartered on Long Island, New York in the United States.

== Background information ==
Vitamin World was founded in 1977 by Arthur Rudolph and is headquartered in Great River, New York. Vitamin World was a subsidiary of NBTY Inc. NBTY manufactured and sold products under the "Vitamin World" label and currently does so under the "Holland and Barrett" and "Puritan's Pride" labels. Under NBTY, Vitamin World had retail stores in North America, Holland and Barrett currently has retail stores in the United Kingdom, and Puritan's Pride is an online / catalog phone ordering division. The companies sell similar products, but each caters to different customers.

Vitamin World sells many of its own supplements under the "Vitamin World", "Herbal Authority", and "Precision Engineered" brands. General vitamins and minerals are sold under the "Vitamin World" brand. Natural beauty products are sold under the "V Therapy" brand and sports nutrition products are sold under the "Precision Engineered" brand. Vitamin World sells products from third party vendors, the majority of which are sports nutrition products.

Vitamin World was acquired by private equity firm Center Lane Partners in 2016.

In January 2018, Vitamin World was purchased by Feihe International Inc. through a Section 363 sale process. Feihe International Inc. is the market-share leader in the manufacturing and distributing of infant formula in China.

== Reception ==
Vitamin World's Ultra Man Daily multivitamin was tested by ConsumerLab.com in its Multivitamin and Multimineral Supplements Review of 38 of the leading multivitamin/multimineral products sold in the U.S. and Canada. This multivitamin passed ConsumerLab's test, which included testing of selected index elements, their ability to disintegrate in solution per United States Pharmacopeia guidelines, lead contamination threshold set in California Proposition 65, and meeting U.S. Food and Drug Administration (FDA) labeling requirements.

In November 2018 Vitamin World announced a new joint antioxidant research initiative with Beth Israel Deaconess Medical Center (BIDMC), a teaching hospital affiliated with Harvard Medical School.

== Bankruptcy ==
On September 11, 2017, Vitamin World, Inc. filed for Chapter 11 bankruptcy which included plans to close at least 51 of its 334 remaining stores nationwide.

In January 2018, Vitamin World was sold to Feihe International, Inc. for US$28 million. Feihe International Inc. is the market-share leader in the manufacturing and distributing of infant formula in China.
