= Crispy fried chicken =

Chinese dish of fried chicken

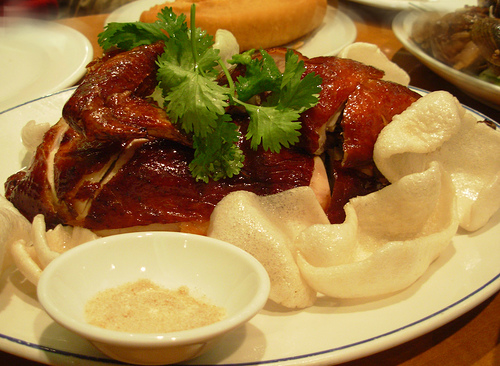
- Course: Main dishes
- Place of origin: China
- Region or state: Hong Kong, Guangdong
- Main ingredients: Chicken

Crispy fried chicken
- Traditional Chinese: 炸子雞
- Simplified Chinese: 炸子鸡
- Hanyu Pinyin: zhàzǐjī
- Jyutping: zaa3zi2gai1
- Literal meaning: fried chicken
Transcriptions
Standard Mandarin
- Hanyu Pinyin: zhàzǐjī
- Bopomofo: ㄓㄚˋ ㄗˇ ㄐㄧ
- IPA: [ʈʂâ tsɹ̩̀ tɕí]
Yue: Cantonese
- Yale Romanization: jajígāi
- Jyutping: zaa3zi2gai1
- IPA: [tsāːtsǐːkɐ́i]
Southern Min
- Hokkien POJ: tsà-tsí-ke

Crispy fried chicken (simplified Chinese: 炸子鸡; traditional Chinese: 炸子雞) is a standard dish in the Cantonese cuisine of southern China and Hong Kong. The chicken is fried in such a way that the skin is very crunchy, but the white meat is relatively soft. This is done by first poaching the chicken in water with spices (e.g., star anise, cinnamon, nutmeg, Sichuan pepper, ginger, fennel, and scallions), drying it, coating it with a syrup of vinegar and sugar, letting it dry thoroughly (which helps make the skin crispy), and deep-frying it.

The dish is often served with two side dishes, a pepper salt (椒鹽) and prawn crackers (蝦片). The pepper salt, colored dark white to gray, is dry-fried separately in a wok. It is made of salt and Sichuan pepper.

Traditionally this dish is eaten at night. It is also one of the traditional chicken dishes served at Chinese weddings and other Asian weddings.

== See also ==
- Chicken fingers
- Chicken fries
- Chicken nugget
- Fried chicken
- Korean fried chicken
- List of chicken dishes
- White cut chicken
