= Korean fried chicken =

Variety of fried chicken dishes from South Korea

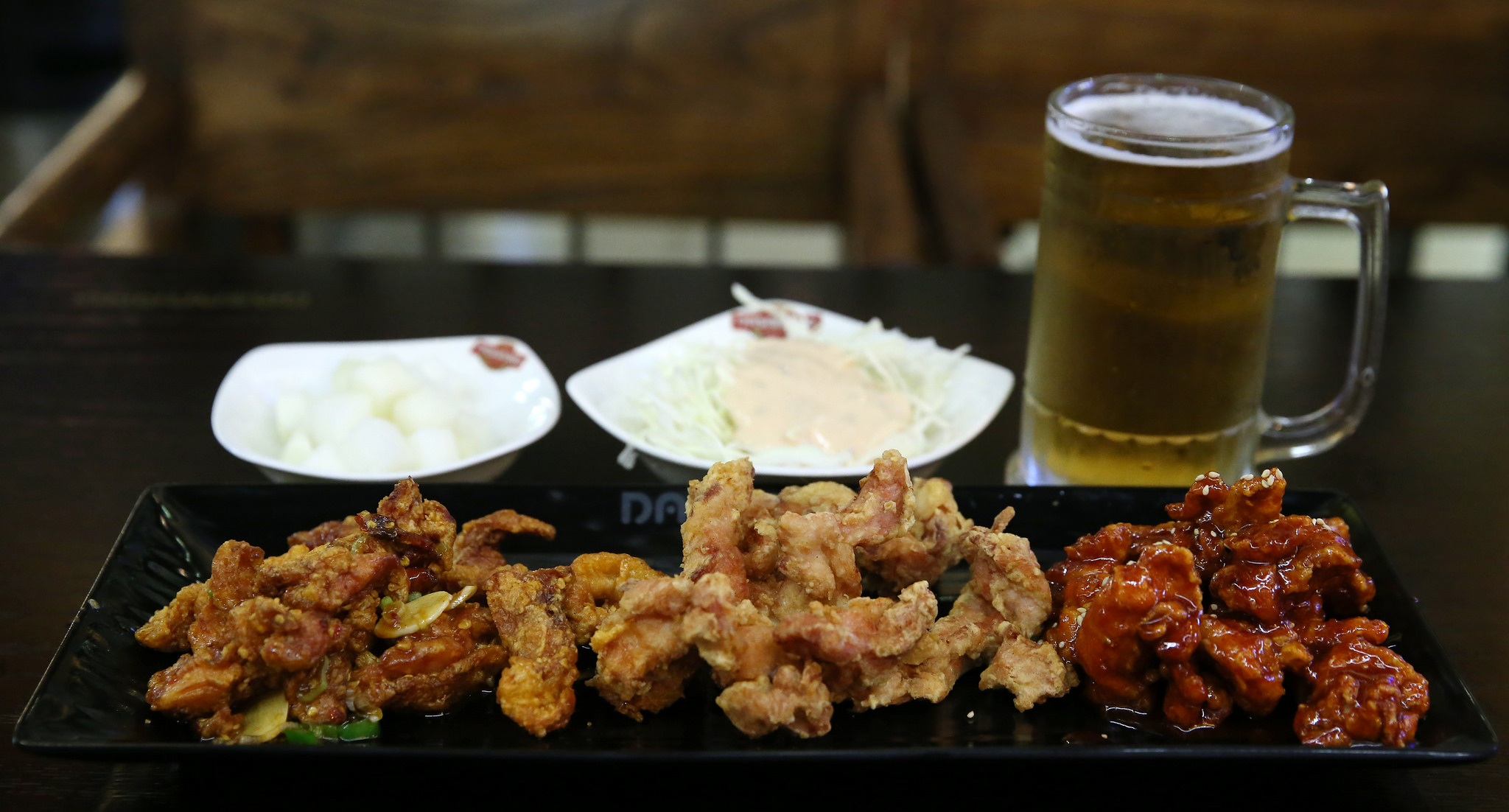
- Ganjang-chicken (coated with soy sauce), huraideu-chicken (regular fried chicken), and yangnyeom chicken (coated with spicy sauce) with a glass of beer

Korean name
- Hangul: 치킨
- RR: chikin
- MR: ch'ik'in
- IPA: [tɕʰi.kʰin]

Korean fried chicken, in Korean chikin (Korean: 치킨, loanword from the English word "chicken"), refers to a variety of fried chicken dishes created in South Korea. These include the basic huraideu-chicken (후라이드 치킨, from the English words 'fried chicken') and the spicy yangnyeom chicken (양념 치킨, 'seasoned chicken'). In South Korea, fried chicken is consumed as a meal, an appetizer, anju (food that is served and eaten with drinks), or as an after-meal snack.

Korean fried chicken was described by Julia Moskin of The New York Times as having a "thin, crackly and almost transparent crust". The chicken is usually seasoned with spices, sugar, and salt, before and after frying. Korean fried chicken restaurants commonly use small or medium-sized chickens; these younger chickens result in more tender meat. After frying, the chicken is usually hand-painted with sauce using a brush to evenly coat the chicken with a thin layer. Pickled radishes and beer (or carbonated drinks) are often served with Korean fried chicken.

== Terminology ==
The Korean word pronounced chikin (치킨) refers to fried chicken, while the name for the domesticated fowl is dak (닭). The word is shortened from peuraideu chikin (프라이드 치킨), which is a transliteration of the English phrase "fried chicken". According to the National Institute of Korean Language, the word chikin (치킨) refers to "a dish made by coating chopped chicken with flour, and frying or baking it". Fried chicken that is not chopped before frying is called tongdak (통닭, 'whole chicken'). Both chikin and tongdak are occasionally referred to as dak-twigim (닭튀김, 'chicken fritter').

The unshortened form peuraideu chikin, despite being the "correct" transliteration, is not as popular in Korea. The more commonly used form, huraideu-chikin (후라이드 치킨), may have been adopted in Korean owing to residual influence from the Japanese convention that persisted in Korea in the 1970s (the Japanese forced occupation only ended in 1945). The phrase huraideu-chikin is often shortened to huraideu (후라이드) and refers to a fried chicken dish without the seasonings added post-frying. This is often used to differentiate it from yangnyeom-chikin (양념 치킨, 'seasoned chicken'). The National Institute of Korean Language does not recognize huraideu-chikin as the conventional name, but insists on the transliteration (and transvocalization) peuraideu-chikin, which it also suggests should be "refined" to dakgogi-twigim (닭고기 튀김, 'chicken meat fritter').

== History ==
The recipe for frying chicken was already a form of cooking in the 15th century, so it is presumed that it has been cooked since the Goryeo period. The fried chicken under the name of "Pogye" (포계) in the early Joseon dynasty was sautéed in oil while sequentially pouring soy sauce, sesame oil, flour mixed with water, and vinegar onto the chicken.

The trend of eating chicken began in Korea during the late 1960s, when Myeongdong Yeongyang Center in Seoul began selling whole chicken roasted over an electric oven. U.S. military presence after the Korean War introduced deep-fried chicken as a popular Korean cuisine. It was not until the 1970s when cooking oil was widely available that the modern fried chicken started appearing in Korea. The first modern Korean fried chicken franchise, Lims Chicken, was established in 1977 in the basement of Shinsegae Department Store, Chungmu-ro, Seoul, by Yu Seok-ho. It was "embraced as an excellent food pairing for draft beer"; the word for the pairing, "chimaek", is a portmanteau of "chicken" and "maekju", the Korean word for beer.

Kyochon fried chicken

The well-known variety with spicy coatings, also known as yangnyeom-chikin, had its history begin in 1982 by Yun Jonggye, who was running a fried chicken restaurant (later Mexican Chicken) at Daegu. He noticed that customers in his restaurant were struggling to chew on the hard, crisp layers of the fried chicken, which led to inconveniences such as scraped palates. Yun decided to pull a twist on the traditional fried chicken to soften the hard shells of the chicken and appease more Korean customers by marinating it sweet and spicy.

Fried chicken was further popularized when Kentucky Fried Chicken opened stores in South Korea in 1984.

The Asian financial crisis in the late 1990s contributed to the number of restaurants selling fried chicken as laid-off workers opened chicken restaurants. In recent years, owing to market saturation in Korea, many of Korea's major fried chicken chains, such as Mexicana Chicken, Genesis BBQ, Kyochon Chicken and Pelicana Chicken, have expanded to set up new presences in the United States, China, Canada, and Southeast Asia.

By 2013, there were more than 20,000 fried chicken restaurants in South Korea serving fried chicken and by 2017, 36,000. Almost a third of the chicken consumed in South Korea is fried; Smithsonian calls it a "ubiquitous staple".

During the COVID-19 pandemic, international chain Bonchon was one of few restaurant chains to continue to add stores.

As of 2026, there were 40,000 fried chicken restaurants in South Korea, with 1,800 more operated internationally by Korean brands in 60 countries, which is double the total of 10 years prior.

Korean chicken franchises have increasingly expanded abroad using master franchise agreements, under which local partner companies operate stores using licensed branding and recipes rather than the Korean parent company establishing its own overseas subsidiaries. In 2026, bhc opened its first store in Ho Chi Minh City, Vietnam, under such an agreement, while BBQ entered Brunei and Kazakhstan through similar partnerships with local operators.

== Varieties ==
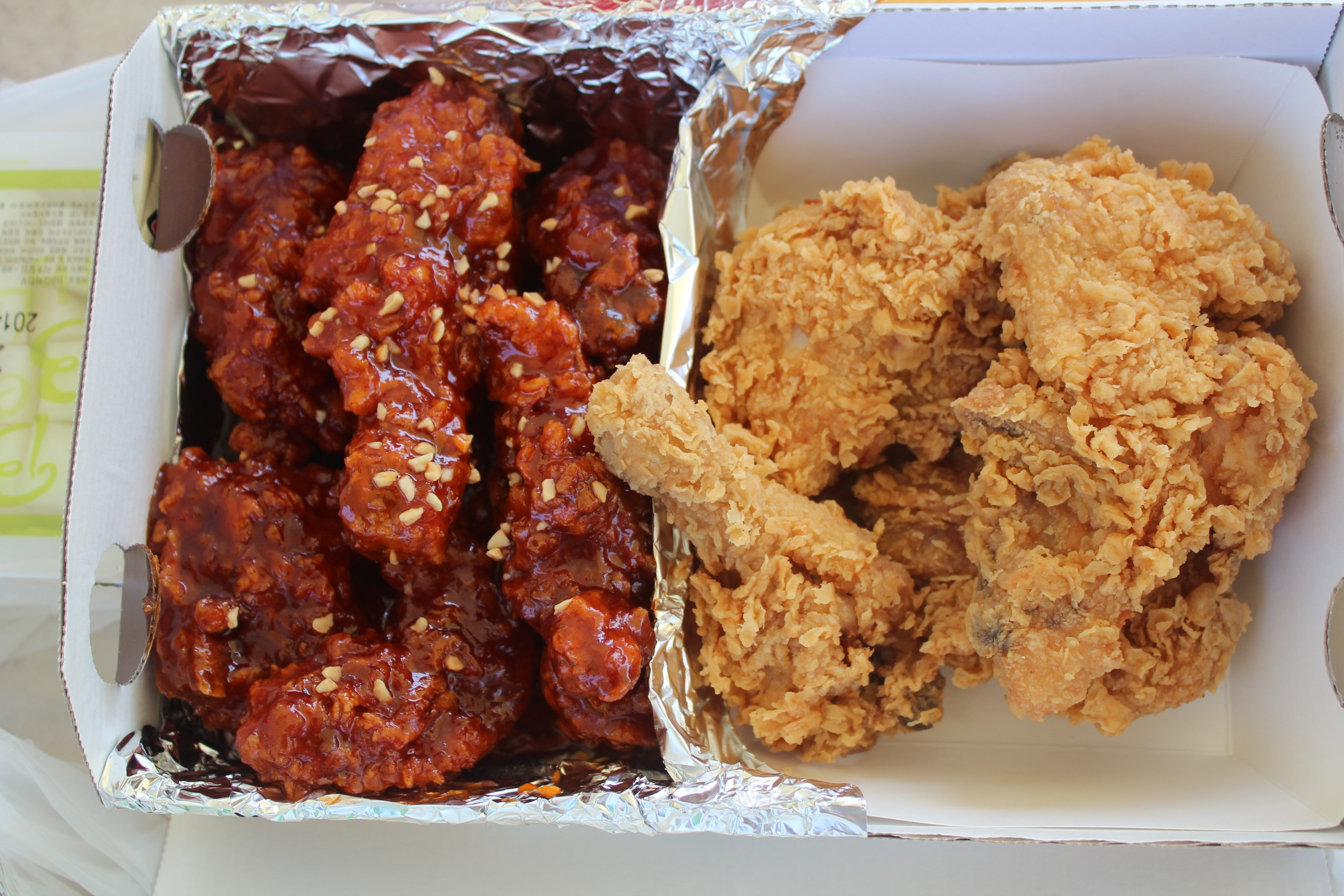
Banban (half seasoned and half plain) chicken

=== By seasoning ===
- Huraideu-chikin (후라이드 치킨, 'fried chicken') – often simply referred to as huraideu (후라이드); this is the basic fried chicken.
- Yangnyeom-chikin (양념 치킨, 'seasoned chicken') – fried chicken coated in gochujang-based sweet and spicy sauce.
- Banban (Korean: 반반; Hanja: 半半, 'half-half') – shortened from yangnyeom ban, huraideu ban (양념 반, 후라이드 반, 'half yangnyeom, half huraideu') is often used to refer to chicken that is served half seasoned and half plain.
- Ganjang-chikin (간장 치킨, 'soy sauce chicken') – fried chicken coated in ganjang-based sweet and savoury sauce, which is often also garlicky.
- Padak (파닭, 'scallion chicken') – fried chicken topped with or smothered with a large amount of thinly shredded scallions.
- Honey-Chikin (허니 치킨, 'honey sauce chicken') – fried chicken with flavours based on soy sauce, but sweeter and more sticky due to the addition of honey.

=== By style ===
- Tongdak (통닭, 'whole chicken') – also called yennal-tongdak (옛날통닭, 'old-time whole chicken'); a 1970s-style whole chicken deep-fried in oil.
- Sunsal-chikin (순살 치킨, 'pure flesh chicken') – boneless chicken.

== Korean brands ==
- Bonchon Chicken
- Coqodaq
- Kyochon
- Nene Chicken
- Pelicana Chicken
- Vons Chicken

== See also ==
- Chimaek
