= Padak =

South Korean fried chicken dish

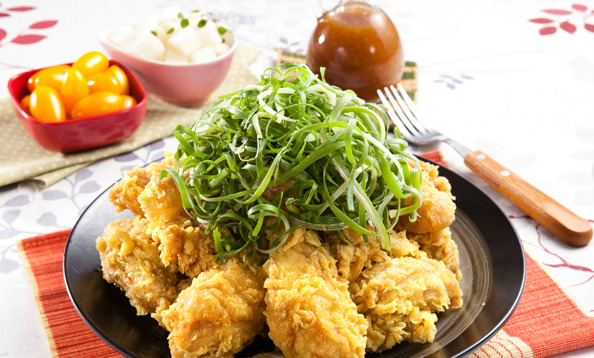
- Type: Korean fried chicken
- Place of origin: South Korea
- Associated cuisine: Korean cuisine
- Main ingredients: Chicken, scallions

Korean name
- Hangul: 파닭
- RR: padak
- MR: p'adak
- IPA: [pʰa.dak̚]

Padak (Korean: 파닭; lit. Scallion chicken) is a South Korean fried chicken dish with scallions.

== Overview ==
Padak originated from a traditional market in Jochiwon-eup, Sejong City, and gradually gained popularity across the nation and beyond, being offered in various fried chicken shops and franchises. The dish tends to be popular in spring as scallions can help relieve the stress accumulated during winter. Padak recipes may vary between individuals and restaurants, but generally it involves marinating chicken meat with a batter that includes salt, pepper, and minced garlic, deep-frying the chicken, then finally adding scallion and a seasoning sauce on top.

== See also ==
- List of chicken dishes
