= Pickled radish =

Radish dish served with Korean fried chicken

- Pickles radish (bottom left) served with Korean fried chicken
- Alternative names: Chikin-mu (chicken radish)
- Type: Pickle
- Place of origin: South Korea
- Associated cuisine: Korean cuisine
- Main ingredients: Radish
- Ingredients generally used: Vinegar, sugar, salt
- Other information: Served with fried chicken

Pickled radish, called chikin-mu (치킨무, "chicken radish") in Korean, is a radish dish served and eaten with Korean fried chicken. Like other banchan, it is a free (and refillable, if not home-delivered) side dish in South Korea.

The vinegar-marinated radish, called Chicken-mu in South Korea, is a white cube-shaped side dish the size of an adult's thumbnail. Usually, when the Korean-fried chicken is served, it is provided free of charge, but there are places that sell it for around 50 cents. In South Korea, the vinegar-marinated radish is served when eating Korean-fried chicken. Cube-shaped, crunchy vinegar-marinated radish is a cool, crisp substitute for celery sticks. Diced radishes are soaked in boiling water, vinegar, salt, and sugar for a day or so. Then refrigerate and serve.

== Similar dishes ==
Pickled yellow radish, known as danmuji in Korea, is a naturally fermented salted food most commonly consumed in Asia. During the fermentation process, unique flavors and metabolites are created that promote the taste, aroma and texture of pickled yellow radish. In South Korea, pickled yellow radish slices are served when eating jajangmyeon, a black noodle dish.

== See also ==
- Dongchimi
- Danmuji
- List of pickled foods
- Kimchi
