= Tongdak =

Korean term for fried whole chicken

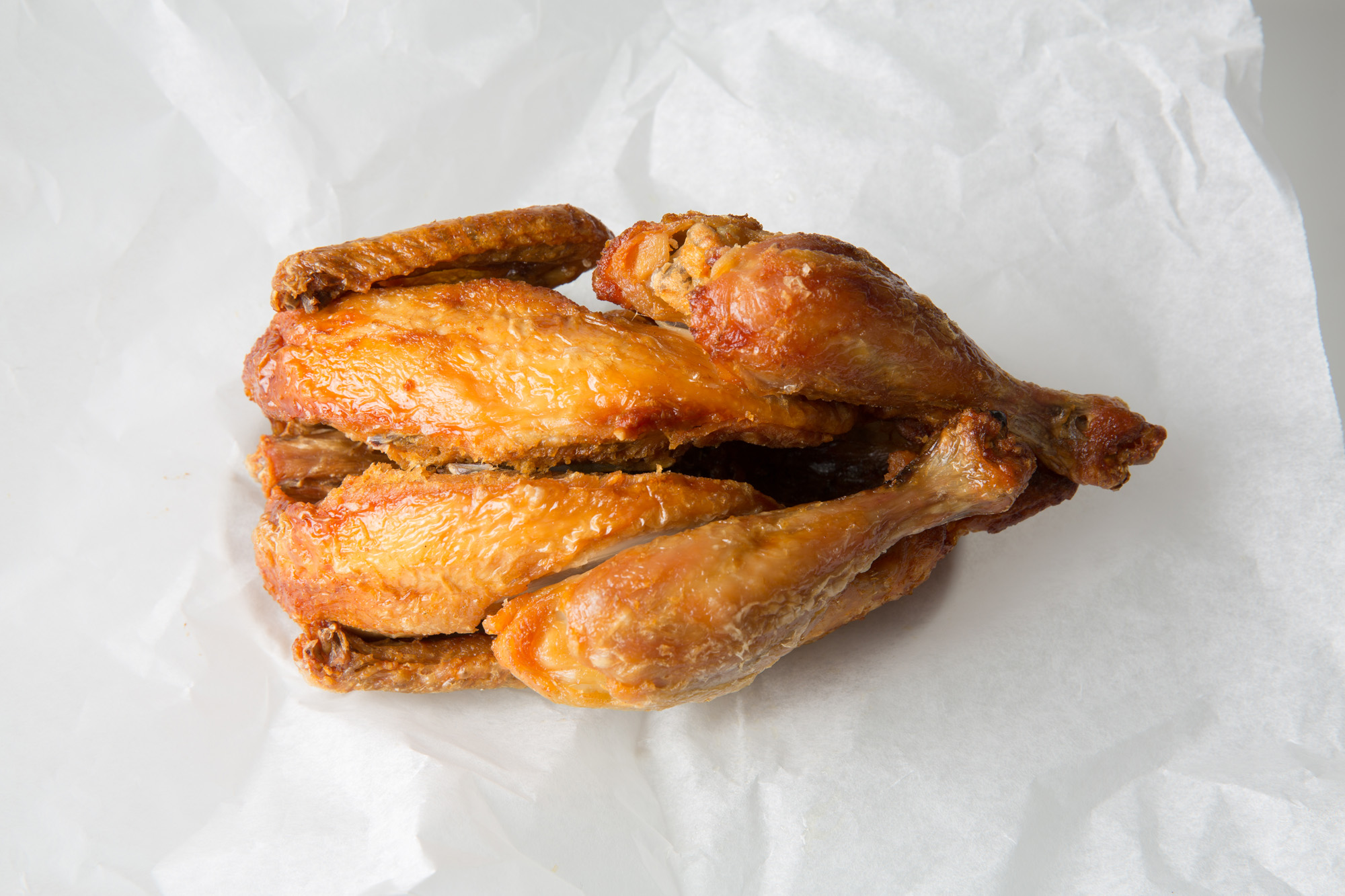
- Alternative names: Whole chicken
- Type: Fried chicken
- Place of origin: South Korea
- Associated cuisine: South Korean cuisine
- Main ingredients: Chicken, cooking oil

Korean name
- Hangul: 통닭
- Lit.: whole chicken
- RR: tongdak
- MR: t'ongdak
- IPA: [tʰoŋ.dak̚]

Tongdak (Korean: 통닭; lit. 'whole chicken') is a chicken in South Korean cuisine, prepared by deep-frying a whole chicken. It was a popular food in the 1970s, being the only kind of fried chicken sold in Korea at that time. It is considered as the proto-Korean fried chicken.

As more varieties of "whole chicken" dishes are also enjoyed in Korea nowadays and the generic term tongdak can refer to any "whole chicken" (e.g. rotisserie chicken is called jeongi-gui-tongdak (전기구이 통닭, "electric-grilled whole chicken") in Korea), the 70s-style whole chicken is now called yennal-tongdak (옛날통닭, "old-time whole chicken"). It is now sold as retro food in many traditional markets as well as streets in provincial cities. Suwon in Gyeonggi Province is famous for its tongdak golmok (통닭골목, "tongdak alley") with dozens of tongdak restaurants that are over 40 years old.

== Preparation ==
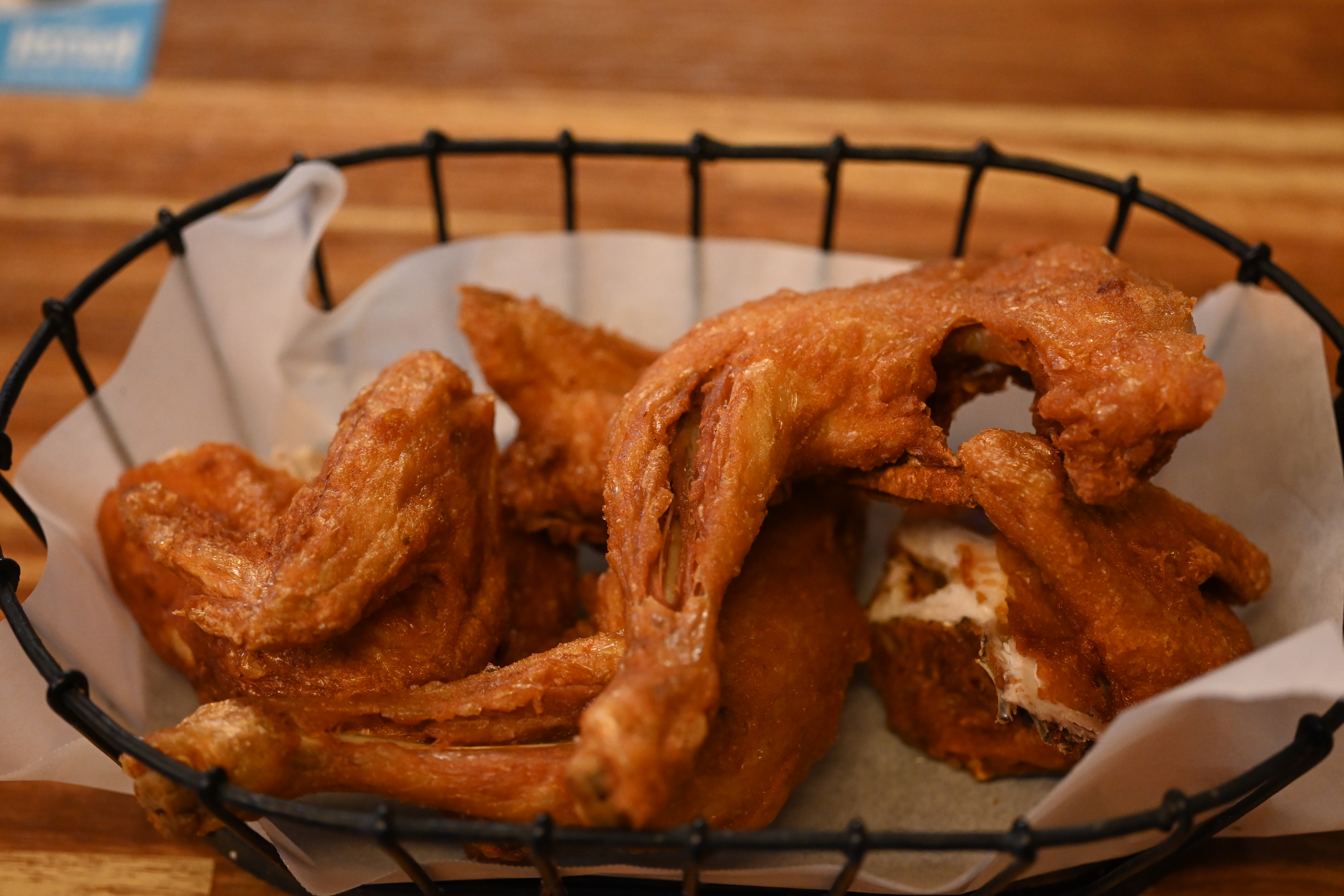
Old-style tongdak, cut before serving

Whole chicken seasoned with salt and black pepper is coated with a thin layer of weak flour (wheat flour with a low W), and deep-fried on low heat for a long time. Before frying, cuts are made to the thicker parts such as the breast and thighs to cook the chicken evenly.

== See also ==
- Korean cuisine
- Fried chicken
- Rotisserie chicken
