= List of franchises =

This is a list of franchised businesses.

== # ==
- 1-800-GOT-JUNK?, junk removal
- 2001 Club, former disco nightclubs
- 5àsec
- 7-Eleven, convenience store
- 99 Speedmart
- 85°C Bakery Cafe

== A ==
- A&W (Canada)
- A&W Restaurants, fast food
- AAMCO Transmissions, automotive
- Aaron's, Inc., furniture rental
- Ace Hardware
- AC Hotels
- Advantage Rent a Car, rental cars
- Aladdin's Eatery
- Aladin Foods
- Al Farooj Fresh
- Allstate, insurance
- Aloft Hotels
- AlphaGraphics, print shop
- Amato's, restaurant
- American Freight
- American Poolplayers Association, pool leagues
- AmericInn
- Ampm, convenience store
- Andy's Frozen Custard
- Anytime Fitness
- Applebee's, restaurant
- Arby's, fast food
- Arcos Dorados Holdings
- Arctic Circle Restaurants
- AR Homes
- The Armoloy Corporation
- Ashley HomeStore
- Assist-2-Sell, real estate
- The Athlete's Foot, footwear
- Atlanta Bread Company, bakery
- Au Bon Pain, bakery
- Auntie Anne's, pretzel shops
- Avid Hotels
- Avis Budget Group
- Avis Car Rental, rental cars

== B ==
- B-Bop's
- Bahama Breeze
- Baja Fresh, restaurant
- Bakers Delight
- Barberitos
- Bargain Booze
- Bar Louie
- Baskin-Robbins, fast food
- Bata, shoes
- Bâton Rouge (restaurant)
- Batteries Plus
- Baymont Inn & Suites, hotels
- Beef O'Brady's
- Ben & Florentine
- Ben & Jerry's, fast food
- Ben Franklin Stores, former five and dime
- Benihana
- Bennigan's
- Berlitz Language Schools
- Best-one
- Bestway Wholesale
- Better Homes and Gardens Real Estate
- Big Apple Bagels
- Big Boy Restaurants
- Big Chicken (restaurant chain)
- Biggby Coffee
- Big O Tires
- Big Smoke Burger
- Billy Sims Barbecue
- Black Bear Diner
- Blimpie, restaurants
- Bluebird Care
- BlueLine Rental
- Bob's
- The Body Shop
- The Boiling Crab
- Bojangles, fast food
- Bonchon Chicken
- Boomarang Diner
- Booster Juice
- Boost Juice
- Borders
- Boston Market
- Boutique La Vie en Rose
- Bread Ahead
- Breadsmith
- BreadTalk
- BrightStar Care
- Brioche Dorée
- Broccoli Pizza & Pasta
- Broken Yolk Cafe
- Brown's Chicken & Pasta
- Bruegger's
- Brumby's Bakeries
- Bruster's Ice Cream
- Bubba Gump Shrimp Company
- Bucking Bull
- Budgens
- Budget Rent a Car
- Buffalo Grill
- Buffalo's Cafe
- Buffalo Wild Wings, fast food
- Buffalo Wings & Rings
- Bulk Barn
- Bumpers Drive-In
- Burger 21
- Burgeranch
- BurgerFi
- BurgerFuel
- Burger King, fast food
- Burger Lounge
- Burger Urge
- Burgerville
- Bush's Chicken
- BWG Foods

== C ==
- Caffè del Doge
- Caffè Ritazza
- California Closets
- California Tortilla
- Camille's Sidewalk Cafe, restaurant
- Candlewood Suites
- Canopy by Hilton
- Cantina Mariachi
- The Capital Grille
- Capriotti's
- Captain D's, restaurant
- Caremark
- Caribou Coffee
- Carl's Jr., fast food
- Carluccio's
- Cartridge World
- Carvel
- Century 21 Real Estate
- Cervecería 100 Montaditos
- Chargrill Charlie's
- Charleys Philly Steaks
- Chatime, tea
- Cheba Hut
- Checkers and Rally's, fast food
- Cheddar's Scratch Kitchen
- Cheeburger Cheeburger
- The Cheesecake Factory
- Chem-Dry
- Chester's, restaurants
- Chez Ashton
- Chick-fil-A, fast food
- Chicken Cottage
- Chicken Delight
- Chicken Express
- Chicken Licken (restaurant)
- The Chicken Rice Shop
- Chicken Salad Chick
- Chicken Treat, fast food
- Chick'nCone
- Chili's
- Choice Hotels, hotels
- Chowking
- Chronic Tacos
- Chung Chun Rice Dog
- Chun Shui Tang
- Church's Texas Chicken, fast food
- Cibo Espresso
- Çiğköftem
- Cinnabon, fast food
- Circle K
- Claim Jumper
- Clean Juice
- Coco's Bakery
- The Coffee Bean & Tea Leaf
- Coffee Beanery, coffee
- The Coffee Club
- Coffee Fellows
- Coffee Time
- Coffee World
- Cold Rock Ice Creamery
- Cold Stone Creamery, fast food
- Coldwell Banker
- College Hunks Hauling Junk and College Hunks Moving
- Complete Entertainment Exchange
- Compose Coffee
- Convenient Food Mart
- Cookies by Design
- Copeland's
- Coramark Inc.
- Corner Bakery Cafe
- Così (restaurant)
- Costa Coffee
- Costcutter
- Cottman Transmission and Total Auto Care
- The Counter
- Country Style
- Courtyard by Marriott
- Cousins Subs, fast food
- Crowne Plaza
- Cruise Planners
- Crumbl Cookies
- Crunch Fitness
- Culligan
- Culver's
- Cupbop
- Cuppy's Coffee, coffee
- Curio Collection by Hilton
- Curves International, fitness clubs
- CWT, travel management services

== D ==
- Dairy Queen, fast food
- D'Angelo Grilled Sandwiches, fast food
- Dave & Buster's
- Dave's Hot Chicken
- Days Inn, hotels
- Del Frisco's Double Eagle Steak House
- Délifrance
- Del Taco, fast food
- Delta Hotels
- Dencio's
- Denny's, restaurant
- Design Hotels
- Dickey's Barbecue Pit, fast casual barbecue
- Dippin' Dots
- DirectBuy
- Disaster Kleenup International
- District Taco
- Dixie Lee Fried Chicken
- Dog n Suds
- Dolce Hotels and Resorts
- Donut King
- Dosa plaza
- DoubleTree
- Doutor Coffee
- Dream Dinners
- Duck Donuts
- Dulce Café, restaurant
- Dunkin' Donuts, fast food
- Dunn Brothers Coffee

== E ==
- Earl of Sandwich (restaurant)
- Earth Burger
- East Side Mario's
- EB Games (formerly Electronics Boutique), video games
- EA
- Econo Lodge, hotels
- Eddie V's Prime Seafood
- Edible Arrangements
- Ed's Easy Diner
- Einstein Bros. Bagels
- Electrodry
- Elevation Burger
- El Jannah
- El Pollo Loco, fast food
- El Pollo Loco (United States)
- Embassy Suites by Hilton, hotels
- EmbroidMe
- Energie Group
- Engel & Völkers
- Erbert & Gerbert's
- European Wax Center
- Even Hotels
- Expedia Cruises, travel
- Extreme Pita
- Ezell's Chicken

== F ==
- Fairfield by Marriott
- FamilyMart
- Famous Dave's
- Fantastic Sams, hair
- Farmer Boys
- Fastsigns
- Fastway Couriers
- Fatburger
- Fazoli's
- Figaro Coffee
- Firehouse Subs, fast food
- First Choice Haircutters
- Five Guys, restaurant
- Flunch
- Fogo de Chão
- Food Republic
- Fosters Freeze
- Foster's Hollywood
- Four Points by Sheraton
- Franchise Group
- Fred Astaire Dance Studios
- Freddy's Frozen Custard & Steakburgers
- Freedom Boat Club
- Fresh Healthy Vending
- Freshii
- Fressnapf
- Friendly's, restaurant
- Frisch's Big Boy, restaurant
- Fuddruckers, restaurant
- Furniture Medic
- Fuzzy's Taco Shop

== G ==
- Gala (supermarket)
- Galito's
- Gaylord Hotels
- Genghis Grill
- German Doner Kebab
- Gino's Burgers and Chicken
- Giraffe World Kitchen
- Gloria Jean's Coffees, coffee retailer
- GNC
- Golden Chick
- Golden Corral, restaurant
- Gold Star Chili
- Gold's Gym, gym
- Goli Vada Pav
- Good Times Burgers & Frozen Custard
- Gourmet Burger Kitchen
- Grandy's
- The Great American Bagel Bakery
- Great American Cookies
- Great Clips, hair
- Great Harvest Bread Company
- Great Wraps
- Grill'd, fast food
- Groucho's Deli
- Ground Round
- Groupe Valentine Inc.
- Guzman y Gomez, fast food
- Gymboree
- Gyu-Kaku

== H ==
- Häagen-Dazs, fast food
- Habit Burger & Grill
- The Halal Guys
- Hamburger Mary's
- Hampton by Hilton, hotels
- Hand & Stone Massage and Facial Spa
- Handel's Homemade Ice Cream
- Happy (restaurant)
- Happy Joe's
- Hard Rock Cafe, restaurants
- Hardee's, restaurants
- Harold's Chicken Shack
- Harry Ramsden's
- Hartz Chicken
- Harvey's
- Hawthorn Suites, hotels
- Hero Certified Burgers
- Hesburger, fast food
- Highlands Coffee
- Hilton Garden Inn, hotels
- Hilton Hotels & Resorts, hotels
- HiQ (tyres)
- HobbyTown USA
- Hog's Breath Cafe
- HokBen
- Holiday Inn
- Holiday Inn Express
- Holland & Barrett
- Home2 Suites by Hilton
- Home Instead
- HomeVestors of America
- Homewood Suites by Hilton, hotels
- The Honey Baked Ham Company
- Honey Dew Donuts
- Hooters, restaurants
- Hot Dog on a Stick
- Hotel Indigo
- Hot Head Burritos
- Howard Johnson's, hotels
- Huddle House
- Hudsons Coffee
- HuHot Mongolian Grill
- The Human Bean
- Hungry Jack's, fast food
- Hurricane Grill & Wings
- HVJ Associates
- Hwy 55 Burgers Shakes & Fries, restaurants

== I ==
- Iberostar Group
- I Can't Believe It's Yogurt!
- Ichibanya
- IGA, Inc.
- IHG Hotels & Resorts, hotels
- IHOP, restaurants
- IKEA
- InterContinental
- Intersport
- Invisible Fence Inc.
- Ivar's restaurants

== J ==
- Jack in the Box, fast food
- Jack's, fast food
- Jackson Hewitt, financial services
- Jamaica Blue
- Jamba Juice, fast food
- Jani-King
- Jax Tyres & Auto
- Jazzercise
- Jean Coutu Group
- Jenny Craig
- Jerry's Subs & Pizza, pizza
- Jersey Mike's Subs, restaurants
- Jiffy Lube, automotive
- Jimboy's Tacos
- Jimmy Buffett's Margaritaville
- Jimmy John's, restaurants
- Jimmy the Greek (restaurant)
- Jinya Ramen Bar
- Joe's Crab Shack
- Joey's Seafood Restaurants
- Johnny Rockets, restaurants
- Jollibee
- Juice It Up!
- Junk King
- Jumbo King
- JW Marriott

== K ==
- K-Bob's Steakhouse
- Kailash Parbat
- Kaspa's
- Kebab Turki Baba Rafi
- The Keg
- Keller Williams Realty
- Kelseys Original Roadhouse
- Kedai Mee Celup Cik Yue, restaurant
- KFC, fast food
- Kiddie Academy Educational Child Care
- Killer Burger
- Kimpton Hotels & Restaurants
- King of Pops
- Klenger Burger
- Knights Inn, hotels
- Knockouts (salon)
- KOA, campgrounds
- Koni Store
- Krispy Kreme
- Krystal, restaurant
- Kumon
- Kung Fu Tea
- Kwik Fit, car repair and servicing

== L ==
- L&L Hawaiian Barbecue
- La Belle Province (restaurant)
- La Bou
- Lafleur Restaurants
- La Madeleine (restaurant chain)
- LaMar's Donuts
- Landry's
- La Porchetta
- La Quinta Inns & Suites, hotels
- La Salsa
- Las Iguanas
- La Tagliatella
- Learning Express Toys
- Lee's Famous Recipe Chicken
- Lee's Sandwiches
- Le Méridien
- Lennys Grill & Subs, fast food
- Léon de Bruxelles
- Le Pain Quotidien
- Liberty Tax, financial services
- Little Big Burger
- The Little Gym, child-oriented gyms
- Little Sheep Group
- LJ Hooker, real estate
- llaollao, fast food
- L'Occitane en Provence
- Logan's Roadhouse
- Londis (United Kingdom)
- LongHorn Steakhouse
- Long John Silver's, fast food
- Lord of the Fries
- Lotteria
- Louisa Coffee, coffee
- Louisiana Famous Fried Chicken
- LSL Property Services

== M ==
- M&M Food Market
- MAACO
- Mace (retailer)
- Mac's Convenience Stores
- Mad Mex (Australia)
- Mad Mex (Pennsylvania)
- Mad Science
- MaggieMoo's Ice Cream and Treatery
- Maid-Rite
- Main Event Entertainment
- Manchu Wok
- Mang Inasal
- Marble Slab Creamery, fast food
- Marriott Hotels & Resorts
- Marrybrown
- Martinizing Dry Cleaning, cleaning
- Mary Brown's
- Massage Envy
- Mastro's Restaurants
- Matco Tools
- Mathnasium
- Max & Erma's
- Max Hamburgers
- Max's Restaurant
- Mazzio's
- McAlister's Deli, restaurant
- McDonald's, fast food
- McDonald's Canada
- McDonald's France
- McDonald's New Zealand
- McDonald's Philippines
- Meadows Frozen Custard
- Meineke Car Care Centers, automotive
- Mel's Drive-In
- The Melting Pot, restaurant
- Menchie's Frozen Yogurt
- Merle Norman Cosmetics
- Merry Maids, cleaning services
- Metal Supermarkets
- Mexican Restaurants, Inc.
- Miami Grill
- Michel's Patisserie
- Microlins
- Microtel Inn and Suites
- Midas, automotive services
- Milestones Grill and Bar
- Milio's Sandwiches, restaurant
- Mister Donut
- Mister Softee
- Mister Transmission
- Mochinut
- Moe's Southwest Grill, restaurant
- Molly Maid, home cleaning
- Monster Mini Golf
- Montana's BBQ & Bar
- Mooyah, fast food
- Morton's The Steakhouse
- MOS Burger
- Mostaza
- Motel 6, hotels
- Mr Bigg's
- Mr. Handyman
- Mr. Rooter
- Mrs. Fields
- Mr. Sub
- Mrs. Winner's Chicken & Biscuits
- Muffin Break
- Mugg & Bean
- Museum of Illusions
- Muzz Buzz, coffee

== N ==
- Nando's
- Nathan's Famous
- National Property Inspections
- Naughty Nuri's
- Navis Pack & Ship Centers
- Needs Convenience
- Netspace
- Newk's Eatery
- New York Fries
- New Zealand Natural
- Nickels Grill & Bar
- NightOwl Convenience Stores
- Nirala Sweets
- Nirula's
- Nintendo, video game company
- Noodle Box
- Noodles & Company

== O ==
- Oberweis Dairy
- O'Charley's
- Office 1 Superstore
- Office Depot, office supplies
- O'Learys
- Olive Garden, restaurant
- On the Border Mexican Grill & Cantina
- Once Upon A Child
- Oporto (restaurant)
- Orange Julius, fast food
- Orange Leaf Frozen Yogurt
- Orangetheory Fitness
- The Original Pancake House
- O'Tacos
- Outback Steakhouse, restaurant
- OzSpy, electronic security

== P ==
- Pacha
- Painting with a Twist
- Pall Mall Barbers
- The Palm (restaurant)
- Pam Golding Property Group
- Pancheros Mexican Grill
- Pancho Villa (restaurant)
- Panda Express, fast food
- Panera Bread
- Paradise Bakery & Café
- Park Plaza Hotels & Resorts
- Party America
- Patisserie Valerie
- Paul (bakery)
- Paychex
- Payless Car Rental
- Pearle Vision, eyecare
- Peet's Coffee
- Pelicana Chicken
- Penn Station (restaurant)
- Perkins Restaurant & Bakery, restaurant
- Pet Supplies Plus
- P. F. Chang's
- Phở Hòa
- Pickl
- Pick Up Stix
- Piggly Wiggly
- Pinkberry
- Pinot's Palette
- Pita Pit, fast food
- Planet Fitness, gyms
- Planet Smoothie
- Planet Sub
- Play It Again Sports
- Play N Trade
- Pollo Campero
- Pollo Tropical
- Pomme de pain
- Ponderosa and Bonanza Steakhouses
- Popeyes, fast food
- Pop Physique
- Port of Subs
- PostNet
- Potbelly Sandwich Shop
- Premier (store)
- Pressto
- Pret a Manger
- Pretzelmaker
- Primo Hoagies
- Primrose Schools
- PropertyGuys.com
- Protea Hotels by Marriott
- Pudgie's
- Putt-Putt Fun Center

== Q ==
- Qdoba, restaurants
- Quality Inn
- Quick, restaurant
- Quickly
- Quiznos, fast food

== R ==
- Radisson Hotels, hotels
- Raine & Horne
- Ramly, fast food
- Rainforest Cafe
- Ralph Lauren Asia
- Ramada, hotels
- RE/MAX, real estate
- Realty One Group, real estate
- Red Hot & Blue (restaurant)
- Red Lion Hotels
- Red Lobster, restaurant
- Red Mango
- Red Ribbon Bakeshop
- Red Roof Inn, hotels
- Red Rooster, fast food
- Reeds Rains
- Regent Hotels & Resorts
- Regis Corporation
- Rei do Mate
- Renaissance Hotels
- Rent-A-Center, rentals
- Rent-a-Wreck, rental cars
- Residence Inn by Marriott
- Rib Crib
- Richardson & Wrench
- Ricky's All Day Grill
- Rita's Italian Ice, fast food desserts
- The Ritz-Carlton Hotel Company
- Roady's Truck Stops
- Roark Capital Group
- Robeks
- Robin's Donuts
- Rocket Fizz
- Rockin' Jump
- Rocky Mountain Chocolate
- Rodeway Inn
- Roll'd
- Rolls (restaurant chain)
- Romano's Macaroni Grill
- Rosemary Conley Diet and Fitness Club
- Roy Rogers Restaurants
- RSG Group
- Rubio's Coastal Grill, restaurant
- Ruby's Diner
- Ruby Tuesday, restaurant
- Runza (restaurant)
- Rusty Taco
- Ruth's Chris Steak House

== S ==
- Studio 6, hotel
- Saladworks
- Salsarita's Fresh Mexican Grill
- Salsa's Fresh Mex Grill, fast food
- Saltgrass Steak House
- Sandella's Flatbread Café
- Save-A-Lot
- Schlotzsky's, fast food
- Schnitz
- School of Rock (company)
- Schoop's Hamburgers
- Scooter's Coffee
- Scores Rotisserie
- SCR (restaurant)
- Sears Appliance Dealer
- Seasons 52
- Second Cup
- Secret Recipe Cakes and Café Sdn Bhd
- Serta (company)
- ServiceMaster
- ServiceMaster Clean
- Servpro
- Seven-Eleven Japan
- Sfera (retailer)
- Shake's Frozen Custard, fast food
- Shane's Rib Shack
- Sheraton Hotels and Resorts
- Shipley Do-Nuts
- Shoeless Joe's
- Shoney's, restaurant
- Signarama
- Sirloin Stockade
- Sir Speedy
- Sizzler
- Skyline Chili
- Sky Zone
- Slim Chickens
- Slumberland Furniture
- Smashburger
- Smithfield's Chicken 'N Bar-B-Q
- Smoke's Poutinerie
- Smokey Bones
- Smoothie King, fast food
- Snap Fitness
- Snap-on, tools and equipment
- Snappy Snaps
- Sneaky Pete's
- Sonesta International Hotels
- Sonic Drive-In, fast food
- Sega
- Sonny's BBQ
- Souper Salad, restaurant
- Sour Sally
- Southern Fried Chicken
- Southern Maid Donuts
- Spar (retailer)
- Speedway (store)
- Spherion, temp agency
- Spoleto (restaurant)
- SpringHill Suites
- St-Hubert
- Stanley Steemer, carpet cleaning
- Staples Inc., office supplies
- Starbucks
- Staybridge Suites
- Steak and Ale
- Steak Escape
- Steak 'n Shake, fast food
- Steers (restaurant)
- Stewart's Restaurants
- Stockade Companies
- St. Regis Hotels & Resorts
- Stuckey's
- Submarina
- Subway
- SugarBun
- Sunrider
- Super 8 by Wyndham, hotels
- Supercuts, hair
- Supermac's
- Surf City Squeeze
- Sweet Frog, frozen yogurt
- Sweet Paris, creperie chain
- Swensen's
- Swig (soft drink shop)
- Swiss Chalet
- Sylvan Learning

== T ==
- Taco Bell, fast food
- Taco Bill
- Taco Bueno
- Taco Cabana
- Taco Del Mar, fast food
- Taco John's, fast food
- Taco Maker
- Taco Mayo
- TacoTime
- Taco Time Northwest
- Tantalizers
- Tapioca Express
- Tastee-Freez
- Tasti D-Lite
- Taziki's Mediterranean Café
- TCBY, fast food
- Teremok
- TGI Fridays, restaurant
- Thai Express
- Thaï Express
- Tijuana Flats
- Tim Hortons, fast food
- Timothy's World Coffee
- TKK Fried Chicken, fast food
- TOGO'S
- Tokyo Tokyo
- Toni & Guy
- Tony Roma's
- Topgolf
- Top Pot Doughnuts
- Total Wine & More
- Toujours Mikes
- TownePlace Suites
- Toys "R" Us, toys
- TP Tea
- Trailways Transportation System
- TravelCenters of America
- Travelodge, hotels
- Tropical Smoothie Cafe, fast food
- Tru by Hilton
- Truly Nolen, pest control
- TRYP by Wyndham
- Tubby's
- Tudor's Biscuit World, restaurant
- Twin Peaks (restaurant chain)
- Two Maids & A Mop, cleaning services
- Two Men and a Truck

== U ==
- U-Haul, truck rentals
- uBreakiFix
- Ultra Tune, car repair and servicing
- United Petroleum
- Uncle Tetsu's Cheesecake
- Upper Crust (restaurant chain)
- The UPS Store

== V ==
- Valvoline
- Valvoline Instant Oil Change, automotive
- Van Houtte
- Vapiano
- VeganBurg
- Village Inn
- Vips (Mexican restaurant)
- The Vitamin Shoppe
- Voco

== W ==
- WaBa Grill
- Waffle House, restaurant
- Wagamama
- Wahlburgers
- Wahoo's Fish Taco
- Wayback Burgers
- Wendy's, fast food
- Wendy's Milk Bar
- WesterN SizzliN
- Western Union
- Westin Hotels & Resorts
- Wetherspoons
- Wetzel's Pretzels, pretzel store
- Whataburger, fast food
- Which Wich?
- White Spot
- W Hotels
- Wienerschnitzel, fast food
- Wienerwald GmbH
- Wild Bird Centers of America
- Wild Birds Unlimited
- Wild Wing Restaurants
- Wimpy (restaurant)
- Wimpy's Diner
- Wingate by Wyndham
- Wingstop, restaurant
- Wing Zone, fast food
- Winmark
- WoodSpring Suites
- Woody's Chicago Style
- World Gym
- Wow! Momo
- Wyndham Hotels & Resorts

== Y ==
- Yard House
- YaYa's Flame Broiled Chicken
- Yogen Früz, frozen yogurt
- Yogoberry
- Yogurtland
- Yogurt Mountain
- Yonghe King
- Yoshinoya
- YO! Sushi

== Z ==
- Zaatar w Zeit
- Zambrero
- Zaxby's, fast food
- Ziebart, automotive
- Zumba

== See also ==
- List of pizza franchises
