= NightOwl Convenience Stores =

Australian convenience store chain

- Company type: Private
- Industry: Retail
- Founded: Brisbane, Australia
- Number of locations: 85 stores (2025)
- Area served: Eastern Australia
- Products: Convenience store
- Owner: Think Convenience
- Website: www.nightowl.com.au

NightOwl Convenience Stores is a franchised system of convenience stores operating in Australia - predominantly in the state of Queensland.

== History ==
The NightOwl, established by Don Halliwell and Rod Craig, opened in 1975 in the Brisbane suburb of Auchenflower. The store pre-dated 7-Eleven opening in Australia by 12 months. The store traded 24 hours a day, 7 days a week, offering an extensive range of traditional supermarket grocery items-together with fresh fruit, vegetables and hot bbq chickens. The store was popular with the growing student and yuppy community in the district. The business concept was franchised in 1987.

In 1995, NightOwl was floated on the stock exchange and was bought out by Retail Services Limited in 1996. RSL is a diversified holdings group mainly based in the retail sector, this helped take NightOwl nationwide

The NightOwl business was purchased by David Hodge in September 2001. The companies Senior Management was changed and the business was re-aligned with a new focus being placed upon growth. Store livery was modernised, multiple-site franchisees were encouraged within the business and investment in training was increased. Taking up the Chair of the 'Australasian Association of Convenience Stores' (AACS) for 2003 and 2004, NightOwl increased its profile within the industry and played host to regular AACS functions within Queensland.

In 2007, the Franchise business was sold to Adam Adams and his company Think Convenience. Adam and his wife Katrina are also the owners of six NightOwl stores in Cairns and North Queensland. As part of a strategy to increase growth dynamically, Think Convenience has re-introduced the company store method of expansion used extensively by Retail Services and discontinued by David Hodge. In order to facilitate the development of new regions and states, company-owned and operated stores were established. In regions like Townsville in Queensland, this has ensured new growth where initially franchisees were not available. Once established in this new area, NightOwl can then encourage franchising using company stores as examples of the business system.

== See also ==
- List of franchises
