= National Property Inspections =

National Property Inspections is a franchise of home and commercial inspection businesses based out of Omaha, Nebraska. The company provides training in primary building inspection methods for its franchisees, such as electrical, heating and cooling, plumbing, and structural systems. Inspection services are provided for home buyers, home sellers, commercial property investors/owners/tenants, real estate agents, attorneys, employee relocation companies, banks, and field service companies.

== History ==
National Property Inspections was founded in 1987 by Roland Bates in Omaha, Nebraska. Franchise opportunities were expanded to Canada in 1987 under the name Global Property Inspections. In total, there are 220 franchises in North America between National Property Inspections and Global Property Inspections. National Property Inspections has been ranked as a Franchise 500 company for 2011 at #292.

== See also ==
- List of Franchises
- Home Inspection
