= Burger 21 =

American fast-casual restaurant chain

- Industry: Restaurant Franchising
- Founded: November 2009
- Founder: Mark and Arlene Johnston
- Headquarters: Tampa, Florida, United States
- Number of locations: Over a dozen (as of 2024)
- Area served: United States
- Products: Burgers
- Services: fast casual dining
- Website: www.burger21.com

Burger 21 is an American fast-casual restaurant chain known for its gourmet burgers. Founded in November 2009 by Mark and Arlene Johnston, the creators of The Melting Pot fondue chain, Burger 21 operates over a dozen locations across several states in the United States. The chain offers a menu featuring 21 burger varieties, fries, salads, and shakes.

== History ==
Burger 21 was founded in Tampa, Florida in November 2009. The concept aimed to fill a niche in the burger market by providing premium, chef-inspired burgers at an accessible price point. The brand quickly grew under Front Burner Brands, its management company based in Westchase, Tampa, Florida. Burger 21 opened its first location in Tampa in 2010, followed by a second location in Carrollwood, Florida in 2011. In 2012, Burger 21 signed its first franchise deals for three units in Orlando, Florida, followed by deals for locations in Atlanta, Georgia and Voorhees, New Jersey. By 2024, Burger 21 had expanded its presence to several states, including Georgia, Illinois, Michigan, New Mexico, North Carolina, and Virginia.

== Menu and Concept ==
The menu features 21 burger varieties, including beef, chicken, turkey, seafood, and veggie options. The restaurant also offers fries with a sauce bar, salads, hot dogs, and shakes.

== Design and Customer Experience ==
Burger 21 is a casual dining fast-food chain. They are expanding into airports, food courts, and college campuses.

== Community engagement ==
Burger 21 integrates community involvement through its local donation program, donating 10% of sales to participating organizations on designated nights.

== Franchising ==
Burger 21 actively pursues franchise expansion, targeting experienced multi-unit franchisees.
