= Metal Supermarkets =

Canadian small-quantity metal supplier

- Type: Private
- Industry: Metalworking
- Genre: Retail
- Founded: 1985 in Mississauga, Ontario, Canada
- Founder: William H. Mair
- Headquarters: Toronto, Ontario, Canada
- Number of locations: 130 stores (2025)
- Products: Metals
- Website: metalsupermarkets.com metalsupermarkets.co.uk

Metal Supermarkets is a franchisor of small-quantity metal stores, cut to the customer's desired size, with no minimum order quantities. For 40 years, Metal Supermarkets has operated a franchising network with over 130 locations across Canada, the United Kingdom, and the United States, as well as an e-commerce website, making it the largest, one of the most experienced supplier in the small quantity metals industry and the only one with international reach.

Founded in Mississauga, Ontario, Metal Supermarkets is headquartered in Toronto, with support offices in Leicester, England and Sydney, Nova Scotia. The current President and CEO is Ryan Prznyk and the Chief Operating and Development Officer is Andrew Arminen.

== History ==
Metal Supermarkets was established in 1985 as a single location in Mississauga by William H. Mair, who saw an untapped market in offering small quantities of metal, which many large metal suppliers could not satisfy. Therefore, Metal Supermarkets adopted a business model based on cut-to-size metals and no minimum order size.

Metal Supermarkets began franchising in 1987, eventually expanding into the United Kingdom in 1994 and the United States in 1996. In 2007, Metal Supermarkets acquired and integrated Metal Express, a similar American metal supplier. Metal Supermarkets opened its 100th location in 2020.

In 2024, Metal Supermarkets achieved significant growth reaching 130 total stores, expanding to new markets across Canada & the United States in varied locations such as Memphis, Colorado Springs, Hartford and across the country. In December 2024 it was announced that Riverarch Equity Partners acquired a majority interest in the company for further fuel growth and success.

Metal Supermarkets celebrated its 40 years of successful operations in early 2025, opening its 100th US-based store in Monroeville, PA. They also welcomed a change in leadership with the appointment of Ryan Prznyk as the new president and CEO.

== Products and services ==
Metal Supermarkets supplies various metals, including various alloys, rolled metals, aluminium, brass, copper, steel, and tool steel, among others, in various shapes and grades such as bars, beams, sheets, and pipes, which can be cut to a size desired by the customer. Franchises can supply more uncommon metals for customers on request. Metal Supermarkets also offers metal cutting, shearing, notching, and fabrication services.

== Locations ==
=== Canada ===
The first Metal Supermarkets store was established in Mississauga, Ontario by William Mair in 1985 and still operates today. In 1987, Metal Supermarkets began franchising and opened its second location in Scarborough, Ontario, before expanding to additional provinces. Presently, Metal Supermarkets operates 25 locations across Canada in Ontario, British Columbia, Alberta, Manitoba, and Nova Scotia.

=== United Kingdom ===
Metal Supermarkets opened their first British store in 1994 in Birmingham, West Midlands. Metal Supermarkets presently operates 8 stores across the UK.

=== United States ===
Metal Supermarkets opened their first American store in 1996 in Atlanta, Georgia, followed in 1997 by additional stores in Buffalo, New York; Cincinnati, Ohio; and Dallas, Texas. The company's 100th store was in San Diego, California, opened in 2020. Metal Supermarkets presently operates across 33 states in the US and opened its 100th store on May 5, 2025, in Monroeville, Pennsylvania.

== Awards ==
- In 2018, Metal Supermarkets President and CEO Stephen Schober was elected a Director of the Canadian Franchise Association.
- In 2021, Metal Supermarkets was in the Franchise Dictionary Magazine's Top 100 Game Changers for 2021.
- In 2021, Metal Supermarkets was ranked the 381st best franchise in Entrepreneur's annual Franchise 500 list.
- Metal Supermarkets was ranked 203rd among top retail franchises according to the 2024 Entrepreneur's Franchise 500 Rankings.

== Community involvement ==
Metal Supermarkets supports skilled trades and vocational education, and advocates for greater awareness of industry shortages and better industry experience among youth. Franchises also allow high school students to gain industry experience through cooperative education, donate metal to local schools, and advocate for trades as viable and in-demand career paths.

In 2019, Metal Supermarkets conducted a survey on students' perception of trade careers. The survey revealed a negative perception of vocational education and a lack of awareness of careers in trades.

Since 2022, Metal Supermarkets has also provided scholarships to trade school students.
