= Kiddie Academy Educational Child Care =

American early learning center chain

- Industry: Early Childhood Education
- Founded: Baltimore County, MD, U.S. (1981)
- Founder: Pauline Miller
- Headquarters: Abingdon, Maryland, U.S.
- Number of locations: 300+ academies (2022)
- Key people: Joshua Frick (President); Michael J. Miller (Executive Chairman); Susan Wise (Executive Vice President and Chief Financial Officer); Casey Miller (Executive Vice President)
- Number of employees: 106 (2022)
- Parent: Essential Brands
- Website: http://kiddieacademy.com/

Kiddie Academy Educational Child Care is an American franchise system of early learning centers with over 300 franchised academies in 33 states and the District of Columbia. Kiddie Academy is headquartered in Abingdon, Maryland.

== History ==
The first Kiddie Academy was opened in 1981 in Baltimore County, Maryland and founded by Pauline and George Miller.

== Curriculum ==
Several Academies are nationally accredited by the National Association for the Education of Young Children (NAEYC), measuring programs and services against more than 400 related accreditation criteria and the 10 NAEYC Early Childhood Program standards.

== Franchising and growth ==
Kiddie Academy locations are independently owned and operated by qualified professionals. The company sold its first franchise agreement in 1993, and expanded outside Maryland in 1996. The company's 200th franchise opened in Vancouver, Washington in December 2017. By the end of 2018, the company had opened more than 210 locations in 29 states and the District of Columbia. The company projects 40 new Academies to open in 2019, which would grow the network to more than 250 open and operating locations.

Currently, there are 16 open Kiddie Academy locations in Kiddie Academy's home state of Maryland: Locust Point, Abingdon, Elkridge, Elkton, Kent Island, Laurel, Oxon Hill, Arnold, Ellicott City, Lanham, Odenton, Gaithersburg, Millersville, Columbia, Urbana and New Market.

In recent years, Kiddie Academy has been recognized by several publications for franchise system growth. The company has been listed in the Franchise 500, Entrepreneur's annual franchise recognition program in 2017, 2018 and 2019. In 2018, Franchise Times included Kiddie Academy on its Top 200+ list, and its Fast & Serious list, the magazine's ranking of smartest-growing franchises.

== Awards & Recognitions ==
- Best Franchises to Buy, Forbes, 2019
- Top Growth Franchise, Entrepreneur Magazine, September 2020
- Franchise Times Top 200+, Franchise Times, October 2020
- Top Private Company, Baltimore Business Journal, August 2020
- Franchise 500, Entrepreneur Magazine, January 2021
- Fastest-Growing Franchise, Entrepreneur Magazine, February 2020
- Top 100 Franchises of 2020, Franchise Gator, February 2020
- The Hottest Industries Today, Entrepreneur Magazine, August 2020
- Top Franchises for Veterans, Entrepreneur Magazine, 2020
- Fastest Growing Franchises, Franchise Gator, 2020
- Top 100 Global Franchises, Franchise Direct, January 2021
- Fast & Serious, Franchise Times, January 2021
