= Cookies by Design =

American bakery chain

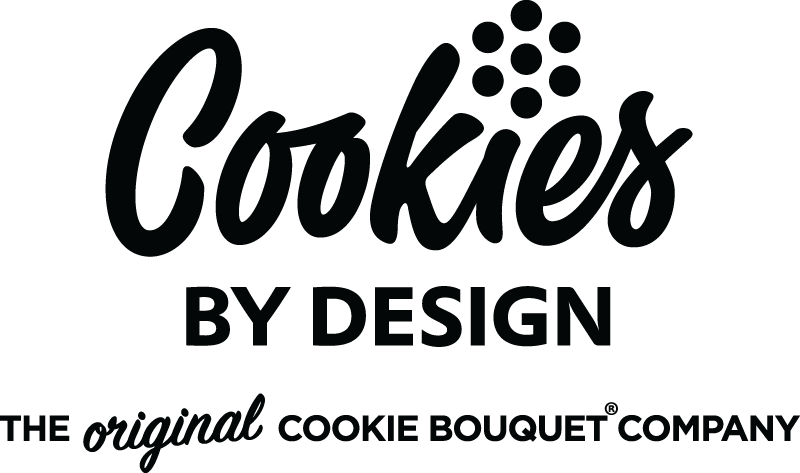
- Founded: 1983
- Founder: Gwen Willhite
- Headquarters: Springfield, New Jersey
- Website: https://www.cookiesbydesign.com/

Cookies by Design, also known as Crumb Corps, LLC, formerly Cookie Bouquet, is a producer of baked goods. The company currently has about 70 corporate and franchised locations across the United States and had $54 million in sales in 2006.

== History ==
Cookies by Design was founded in 1983 in Plano, Texas by Gwen Willhite after she lost her previous job. The company's signature product was the "cookie bouquet": arrangements of cookies or other baked goods on sticks in a decorative container, similar to a flower bouquet, intended to be given as gifts or used for decor. The first franchised Cookie Bouquet location opened in 1987. The company changed their name to Cookies By Design after the trademark was challenged during the company's expansion into California by a San Jose company called Cookie Florist that also sold similar bouquets.

The company was sold to Crumb Corps in 2007, and Jon Rice took over as president and CEO. The company was sued by Eat'n Park in 2010, Eat'n Park alleging that Crumb Corps infringed on their smiley-face cookie.

The company began selling cupcakes in 2015 under the brand name Cupcakes By Design. It began offering cupcake delivery nationwide in 2021.
