= Juice It Up! =

Juice and smoothie chain based in the United States

- Industry: Drinks
- Founded: 1995
- Number of locations: 90 chain stores
- Key people: Frank Easterbrook

Juice It Up! is a franchised raw juice, bowl and smoothie bar company. It has 130 locations open or under development across California, Arizona, New Mexico, Oregon, Texas, and Nevada. Juice It Up! delivers real fruit handcrafted fruit and veggie smoothies, fresh squeezed raw juices, acai and pitaya fruit and smoothie bowls, and cold-pressed bottled juices and shots, as well as healthy snacks. Chris Britt and Ed St. Geme are the company's principal owners. The company is based in Newport Beach, California, and originated in 1995.

== History ==
Frank Easterbrook was the principal owner, president, and CEO of Juice It Up! from 2001 to 2018. It was founded in 1995 when its first location in Brea, California opened. He was also the chief executive for Juice It Up!’s management service company, Balboa Brands, Inc.

The company was acquired by Chris Britt and Ed St. Geme in 2018. Chris Britt and Ed St. Geme, co-CEOs and owners of Mountain Mike’s Pizza, and co-chairmen and owners of the Juice It Up! franchises, share a love of Newport Beach and the franchise concepts they’ve acquired and built up. The pair met while attending Stanford University and, after acquiring Mountain Mike’s Pizza in 2017 and Juice It Up! in 2018, they moved the concepts’ headquarters to Newport Beach.

The company initially began as a juice and smoothie company and has since shifted gears to also offer an expanded line of raw juices to capitalize on the growing interest in juicing.

Beginning in August 2011, Juice It Up! began retrofitting its locations with Raw Juice Bars. This allowed the company to offer additional beverage blends beyond its smoothies that were also healthy and functional, and the first Raw Juice Bar opened in January 2012. It has now been recognized as the company with the most Raw Juice Bars in Orange County, California.

In 2017, Juice It Up! launched its cold-pressed bottled juice and shot line, which features six unique juices and three shots with natural ingredients.
