= Hand & Stone Massage and Facial Spa =

Chain of massage spas in the United States

- Industry: Spa
- Founded: 2004
- Founder: John Marco
- Headquarters: United States of America
- Key people: John Teza(CEO and President)
- Owner: Franchise Operation
- Website: handandstone.com

Hand & Stone Massage and Facial Spa is a chain of franchised massage and facial spas in the United States founded in 2004 by John Marco. The spa offers various massages including Swedish massage, hot stone massage, couples massage, foot massage and facials.

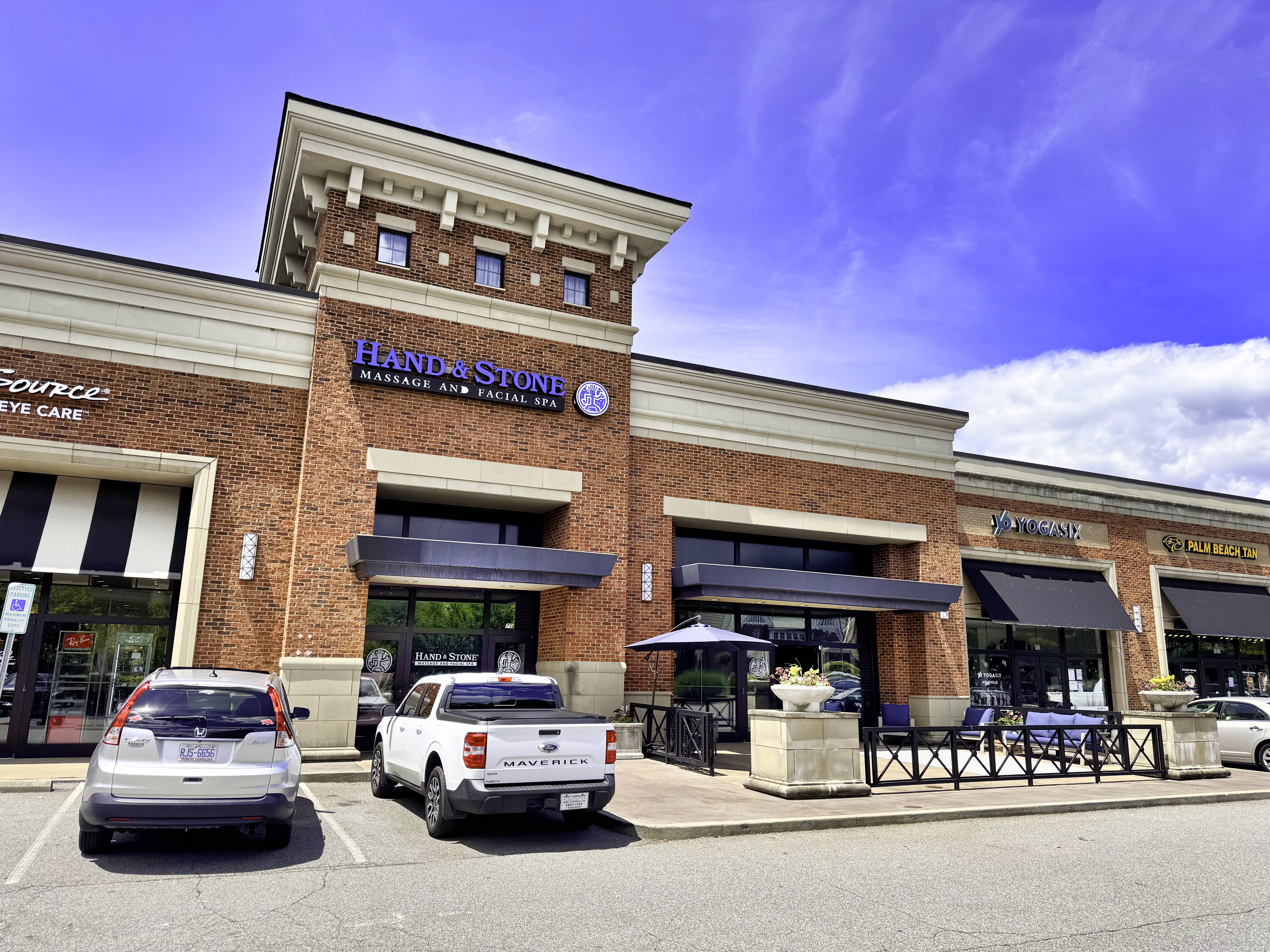
Hand & Stone in Asheville, North Carolina

== History ==
Hand & Stone began franchising in 2006 and has since expanded to over 550 locations in the United States and Canada.
