= Pressto =

- Countries with Pressto shops
- Founded: 1994, Madrid, Spain
- Services: Cleaning and ironing
- Website: www.pressto.com

Pressto is a franchising network specialized in laundry and dry cleaning from Spain. Today, Pressto has more than 500 outlets in 25 countries.

== History ==
Pressto was established in 1994 in Chamberí, Madrid. Afterward, they successfully opened their first international branch in Mexico in 1997.

In the 2000s, the company made major acquisitions of franchisees and master franchisees, particularly in the countries of Asia, Middle East and South America. Some expansion included in Malaysia (2008), Singapore (2009), India. In America, the expansion continued in other Latin-American countries such as Peru, Venezuela, Costa Rica, Colombia, Dominican Republic and Panama.

Since 2016, Pressto has awarded as Top 100 Global Franchise Direct, making Pressto as the best global franchise based from its size of the network, revenues, stability, growth of the chain and the years in operation. In Mexico, Pressto has gained awards for three consecutive years in a row from Superbrands organization from 2014 to 2017.
