= Burger Urge =

Australian restaurant chain

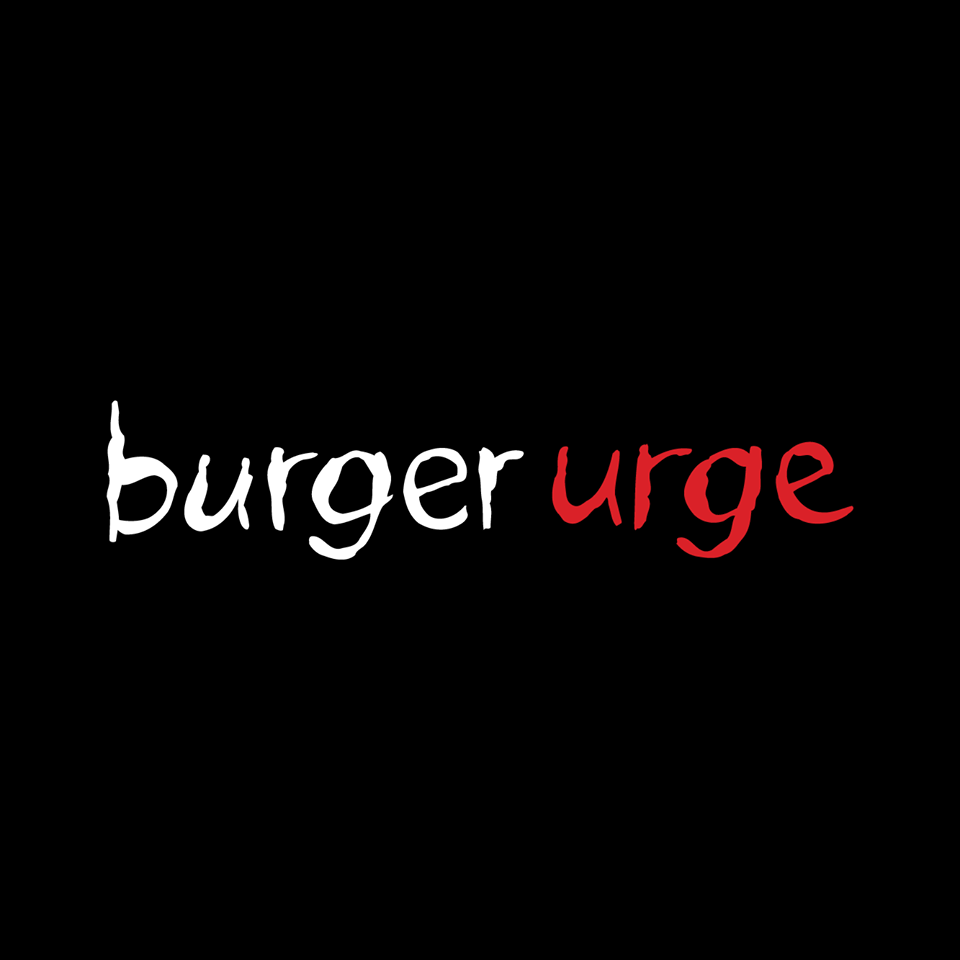
- Type: Private
- Industry: Restaurant
- Founded: 2007; 19 years ago Fortitude Valley, Queensland, Australia
- Founder: Sean Carthew; Colby Carthew
- Headquarters: New Farm, Brisbane
- Area served: Australia
- Products: Hamburgers; wings; salads; chips; alcoholic beverages; milkshakes; soft drinks
- Website: burgerurge.com.au

Burger Urge is a Brisbane, Australia-based gourmet burger chain. It was founded by brothers Sean and Colby Carthew in 2007 as a small local restaurant on Brunswick Street, Fortitude Valley. As of October 2025, there were 31 Burger Urge restaurants in Australia.

== Products ==
Burger Urge's menu includes burgers, wings, fries, salads, and various sides. Vegan and gluten free options for people with restricted diets are also provided. Beverages include craft beers and cider, tap beer, milkshakes and soft drinks.
