= OzSpy =

Australian electronic security chain

- Type: Franchise
- Industry: Electronic security
- Founded: 1998; 28 years ago in Brisbane, Australia
- Website: www.ozspy.com.au

OzSpy is an Australian franchise chain specialising in electronic security. OzSpy has 10 stores throughout Australia, particularly in capital cities.

== History ==
John Vlamis and Craig Mitchell founded the company in 1998, and began offering franchises in 2003.In 2007 OzSpy expanded to New Zealand, but withdrew soon after primarily due to lack of sales and distribution issues. The group now has 10 stores. The franchise administration office and warehouse is located on Queensland's Gold Coast.

It was the first store in Australia to make available to the general public surveillance devices of the type previously used only by private investigators.

In 2018 OzSpy introduced the mobile franchise offer allowing more flexibility and giving people the opportunity to work from home.

In 2018 OzSpy split the online stores into two separate entities to properly cater for both sides of the business and the new mobile division.

== Concept ==
OzSpy founder Craig Mitchell initially based the concept on Spy Shops commonly found in the United States, and adapted it to suit the Australian market. By adding a full range of commercial security products and services that caters to the needs of business and industry they positioned stores and business model to meet the security needs of a nation experiencing an increase in crime.

== Stores ==
OzSpy stores can be found in Queensland, Victoria, Tasmania and South Australia. The stores have a strong capital city emphasis with most outlets located in metropolitan areas. There are also mobile franchises that provide a low cost entry into the market.
