= Junk King =

Junk removal service

- Company type: Private Company
- Industry: Junk Removal
- Founded: 2005, San Carlos, California
- Headquarters: Burlingame, California
- Key people: Michael Andreacchi, CEO; Lisa Merry, Chief Operating Officer
- Products: Junk Removal Services, Dumpster Rental
- Brands: Junk King, Junk Works
- Owner: Neighborly, Inc.
- Website: www.junk-king.com

Junk King is a privately held junk removal and recycling company with over 100 franchise territories in the United States and Canada.

== History ==
Junk King was started in San Carlos, California in 2005 by childhood friends Mike Andreacchi and Brian Reardon. After Andreacchi had worked for 1-800-GOT-JUNK?, he observed first-hand how the branded junk removal business model increased the speed of growth of the franchises. He realized he could create his own junk removal business and service many different customers.

Junk King began franchising in 2010 and since then has expanded across the United States. The company has also expanded into Canada under the name "Junk Works". Junk King and Junk Works reuse, recycle, or donate high percentages of items collected. Neighborly announced their acquisition of Junk King, with their official purchasing date being November 2nd, 2022. Neighborly added Junk King to its home services company portfolio as a junk removal and hauling company, as one of the largest home services networks. Junk King is considered to have more than 100 operating locations including in different countries like Canada and the United States maintaining franchises in North America.

== Area served ==
As of April 2017, Junk King and Junk Works combined have over 100 franchises doing business in the United States and Canada, including in Atlanta, Boston, Cleveland, Dallas, Kansas City, Los Angeles, Pittsburgh, Sacramento, San Antonio, Reno, Dallas, Birmingham, Boise, Indianapolis, and San Diego.

Junk King recycles up to 50% of all the debris they haul. Junk King was named one of INC. magazine's ten most promising franchises of 2011.
