= Broccoli Pizza & Pasta =

Restaurant chain

Broccoli Pizza and Pasta LLC
- Type: Private
- Industry: Restaurants Chain
- Founded: 2011
- Headquarters: Dubai, UAE
- Number of locations: 129 (January 2019)
- Areas served: UAE, UK, KSA, EGY, OMA
- Products: Pizza, Pasta, Salad, Soup
- Website: www.broccoli.ae

Broccoli Pizza and Pasta LLC (also known as Broccoli) started as a self-operating Italian restaurant headquartered in Dubai, United Arab Emirates. It primarily serves pizza, pasta, lasagna, soup and salad.

The company also provides franchises, and has, franchise opportunities globally.

== History ==
In 2011, the first Broccoli Pizza & Pasta opened its door in Tecom, Dubai. After a year, the 2nd branch was opened in Jumeirah, Dubai.

In early 2013, the chain becomes available in other emirates of UAE. It also became known outside Dubai for the face painting activity for children.

The first Broccoli Pizza and Pasta location outside UAE opened in Riyadh, Saudi Arabia in 2015.

Later in June 2016, this chain opened a branch in Covent Garden, London, United Kingdom. As of December 2016, it operates at 40+ store, 30 of which are in the UAE, its originated country origin, and 15+ are located in foreign markets.

In January 2018, the chain expanded to the Al Saadah neighborhood in Salalah in Oman. In February, the restaurant opened in Qurum.

The company aspires to expand to 300 locations by 2018 across Middle East and North Africa, Asia and Europe.

== Concept ==
Broccoli Pizza and Pasta is an Italian-style fast food restaurant specializing in pizza, pasta, salad, soup and lasagne. This restaurant gives customers an option to customize their own meal. In UAE, Broccoli serves Coca-Cola products for its beverage.

Broccoli Pizza and Pasta's signature product is Original Italian Pizza. In 2015, Broccoli Pizza and Pasta introduced the Pesto Pasta which had annual sales of over $200,000.

The company began selling their homemade juice at some UAE stores in 2015.

== Franchising ==
The company had put years into researching the markets around the world with the aid of PICO International since it being on a concept stage in 2009. The company made available the opportunity to Franchise with a startup fee of $12,500 and with a total capital expenditure of $250,000. This totaled up to an average revenue per site of $15,000 per week.
