= Fresh Healthy Vending =

American vending machine company

- Company type: Vending machines; Franchising
- Industry: Vending
- Founder: Nick Yates
- Headquarters: 9605 Scranton Rd. #350; San Diego, California 92121; United States
- Area served: US Nationwide Excluding CA
- Products: Vending Machine
- Number of employees: 15-20
- Website: Company Website

Fresh Healthy Vending is a vending machine company located in San Diego, California specializing in healthy alternatives to traditional vending machine snack foods and beverages. It was founded in June 2010. The company's refrigerated machines offer carrots, yogurt, smoothies, granola bars and beverages such as milk, juice and teas.

The company states that it sells only organic, natural and healthy foods and drinks, and the branded vending machines appear largely in schools, hospitals, health clubs and community organizations. As of 2011, the company had more than 2,000 vending machines in place around the country; about three-quarters of them are in schools. The company operates under a franchise model.

Fresh Healthy Vending has been active in providing healthy vending products to schools, as encouraged by the Healthy, Hunger-Free Kids Act of 2010, which placed a prohibition on high-calorie junk food in school vending machines.

In 2010, Fresh Healthy Vending became a publicly traded company trading under the stock symbol VEND. Fresh Healthy Vending was nominated by both Entrepreneur and Inc magazine.

In 2015, Fresh Healthy Vending changed its name to Generation Next Franchise Brands and in the same year launched Reis and Irvy's Frozen Yogurt Robot Vending Franchise.

In 2019, launched a corporate owned fund to operate the frozen yogurt vending robots in 2019.

== Legal and regulatory complaints ==
In 2013, the California Corporations Commission filed action against Fresh Healthy Vending, Inc. found Fresh Healthy Vending to have "committed multiple violations of the California Franchise Investment Law." The company is currently not permitted to market or sell franchises in California, and is limited to operating locations under its direct control and ownership.

In March 2016, the company was reported to the Securities Exchange commission for allegedly hiring spammers to distribute material promoting the company to large numbers of individuals in an effort to increase stock prices.

Fresh Healthy Vending declared bankruptcy on September 27, 2018.
