= Truly Nolen =

American pest control company

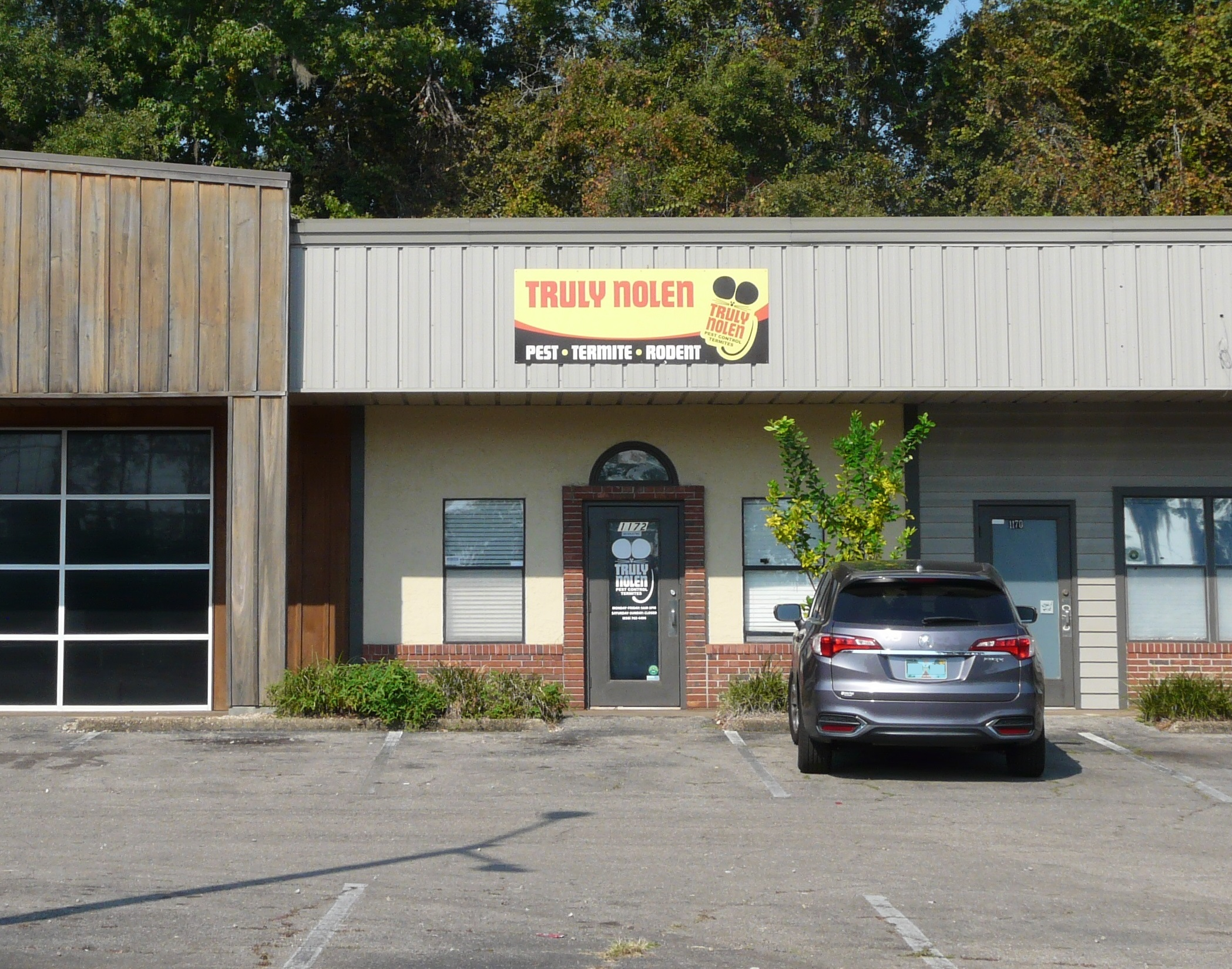
Truly Nolen location in Tallahassee, Florida

Truly Nolen is one of the world's largest family-owned pest control companies in the United States, and the brand is most commonly associated with the yellow mouse car. It has over 70 corporate locations in the United States and over 40 domestic franchises in the U.S., Puerto Rico, and Canada. A separate arm of the company, Truly Nolen International, has over 200 international franchises in over 65 countries.

== History ==
The company's founder, Truly David Nolen went to work for his father Truly Wheatfield Nolen in Miami, Florida in 1938 for a pest control company called Economy Exterminators. Truly David Nolen eventually moved to Tucson, Arizona where he opened his own company called Truly Nolen in 1955. After he purchased his father's company in 1966, the lineage for his own company now stretched back to 1938 and allowed him to begin growing one of the nation's largest family-owned businesses to other states besides Arizona and Florida.

Truly David Nolen, died Tuesday, April 18, 2017, at his Florida home at the age of 89.

== Structure ==
The company integrated the business originally owned by the current executive officer, Truly David Nolen, in Tucson, Arizona and the business of his father, Truly Wheatfield Nolen, owned prior to his death in 1966 in South Miami Beach, Florida. There are about 70 branches in seven states. The company operates in a decentralized manner with administrative units in separate cities.

The company offers franchises.

=== Training Centers ===
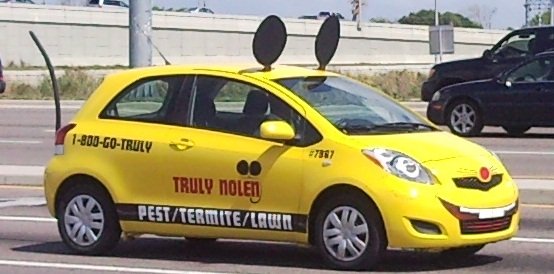
Truly Nolen Pest Control Toyota Yaris fleet vehicle.

The company maintains two training centers run by full-time staff in Florida and Arizona.

Training is conducted both in the classroom and in the field to ensure the employees are trained to the legal standard in the state they are employed. Initial training for all employees is targeted at passing the state's licensing or certification examination along with basic customer service and treatment techniques.

=== Branch types ===
==== Commercial pest control ====
Specialized Commercial branches focus on industrial and commercial properties and offer advisement services in addition to treatment options.

==== Termite ====
Termite branches employ specialized training in termite and wood destroying organism control techniques and may include fumigators in some areas. Termite pretreatment is also performed through these branches. Truly Nolen can employ additional techniques to mitigate damage or appearance degradation from conventional treatment techniques.

==== Franchise ====
Franchise branches have become increasingly important to Truly Nolen's growth strategy and differ from corporate branches in that they're independently owned and operated by local partners. As of 2018, there are approximately 30 franchise branches throughout North America. Services vary from one franchise branch to the next depending on the local needs and pest pressure of the respective geography.
