= Pickl =

Burger restaurant

Pickl Catering Services LLC
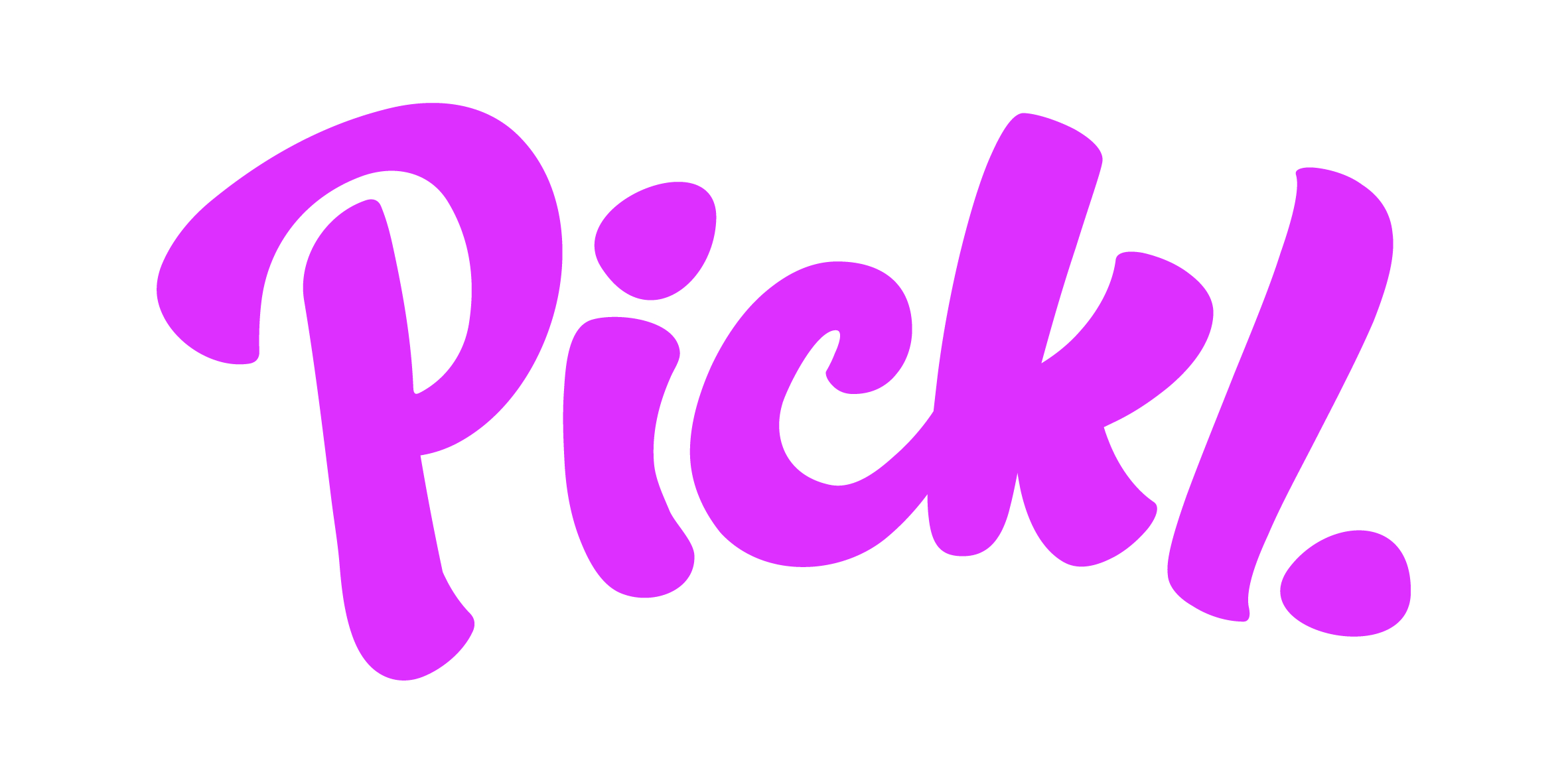

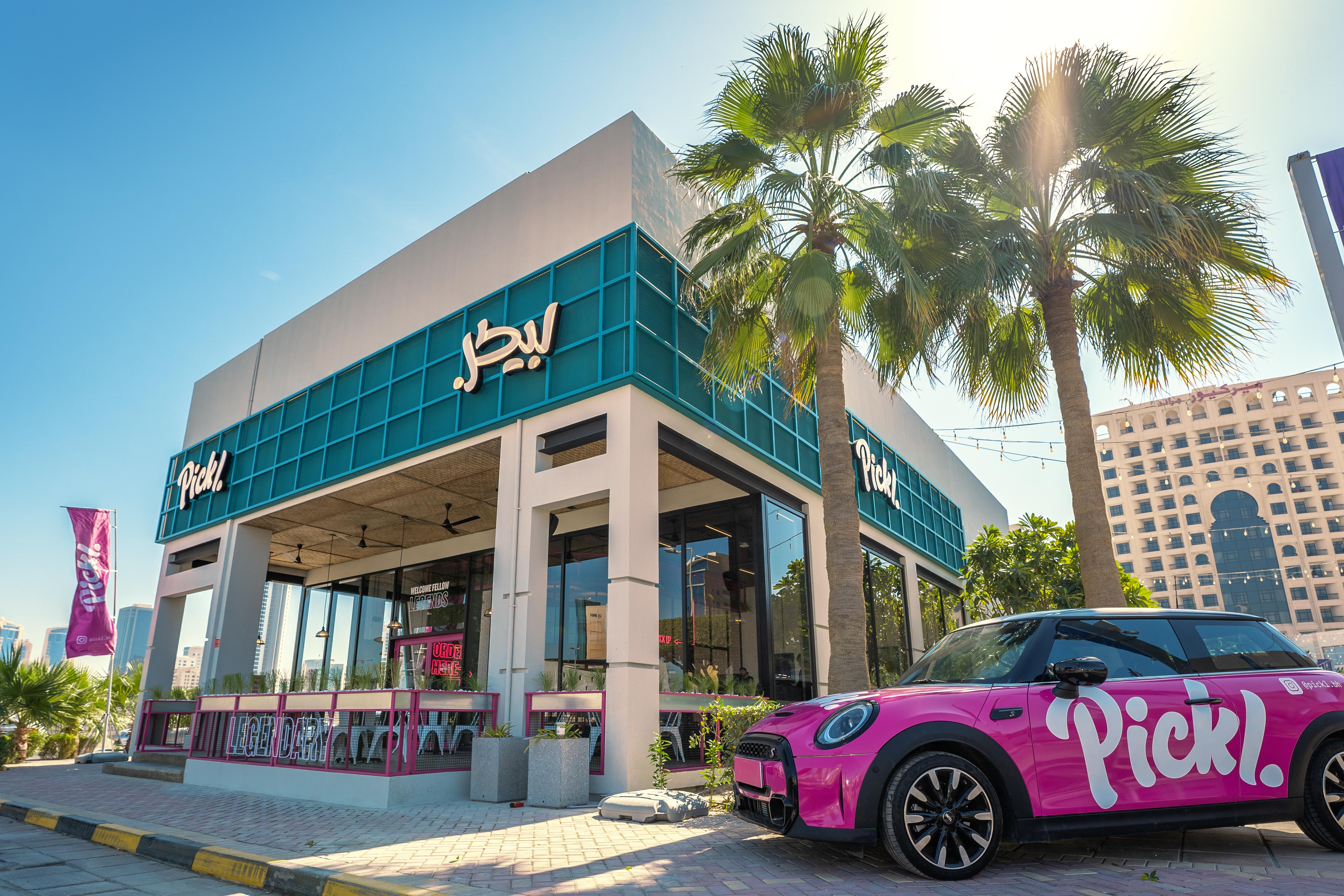
- The first franchised international Pickl restaurant in Bahrain.
- Industry: Restaurants
- Founded: April 2019; 7 years ago in Dubai, UAE
- Founder: Steve Flawith; Nabil Al Rantisi
- Number of locations: 15 (September 2023)
- Area served: United Arab Emirates, Bahrain, Qatar, Egypt, Jordan
- Products: Cheeseburgers, chicken sandos, milkshakes, fries
- Parent: Yolk Brands
- Website: eatpickl.com

Pickl is a chain of American-style fast food burger joints founded in the UAE in 2019. As of September 2023, Pickl has 18 locations in the UAE plus 2 franchised international restaurants in Bahrain, three in Egypt, and one in Qatar and one in Jordan. According to their website, the chain 'focuses on "fresh fast food" using premium ingredients that are free from hormones, preservatives, or antibiotics.'

== History ==
=== Early history ===
The first Pickl opened in Dubai's Jumeirah Lakes Towers community in April 2019 at the One JLT building. The menu consists of cheeseburgers, chicken sandos, and plant-based Impossible-branded burger options.

Pickl was immediately popular, with Esquire Middle East calling it "one of the city's top burger joints". It expanded quickly, with new stores opening in Motor City, Al Safa, and Madinat Badr.

==== Time Out Market ====
In April 2021, the brand was selected as one of Dubai's best homegrown brands and inducted into Time Out Market, alongside brands including Reif Kushiyaki, Mattar, Masti, and BB Social Dining.

==== An/Other Pop-up ====
PIckl opened a concept pop-up store in July 2021. Open for just one year, it was built around the concept of 100 Years of Burgers, with the menu changing every three months to introduce the next generation of historic burgers including ones based upon the Big Mac and In-N-Out's classic Double Double.

=== Domestic and international expansion ===
By the end of 2021, Pickl has expanded to Abu Dhabi, opening its first store at Soul Beach, Mamsha, and following it up with a second in early 2022 at World Trade Centre. Following the end of the An/Other pop-up, a full-scale Pickl restaurant was opened in City Walk, and by the end of 2022, the brand was in four Emirates with outlets opening in Sharjah and RAK in December. In early 2023, Pickl made its first foray into the international market with the opening of a franchised outlet in Bahrain in partnership with Zayani Foods. A second store followed later in the year in Juffair Square.

Pickl launched in its third country in 2024 when it opened in Doha, Qatar. This was another franchise partnership, this time with Golondrina Hospitality. A fourth international launch quickly followed with three restaurants opening simultaneously on the North Coast of Egypt in a franchise partnership with Sky Restaurants.

Per Caterer Middle East, Pickl plans to open 30 restaurants across Saudi Arabia, Egypt, and Kuwait with Sky Restaurants in the coming years. The brand also revealed ambitious plans to open 200 stores globally by 2027, including 50 in the GCC.

== Locations ==
Country/Territory	Date of first store	No. of operating outlets
United Arab Emirates	2019	14
Bahrain	2023	2
Qatar	2024	2
Egypt	2024	4
Saudi Arabia	2025	3
Jordan	2026	1
Oman	2026	1
