= Cold Rock Ice Creamery =

Australian-owned ice cream parlour chain

- Industry: Ice cream parlor
- Founded: 1996 in Aspley, Queensland
- Headquarters: Melbourne, Victoria, Australia
- Number of locations: 90 stores
- Parent: Franchised Food Company
- Website: coldrock.com.au

Cold Rock Ice Creamery is an Australian-owned ice cream parlour chain. The company's main product is centred around customers choosing combinations of ice cream and various other confectioneries, which are mixed in front of the customer within their store. Cold Rock sells their ice cream as individual ice cream combinations in a cup, cone, take-home pack, loaded shake, or ice cream cakes.

== History ==
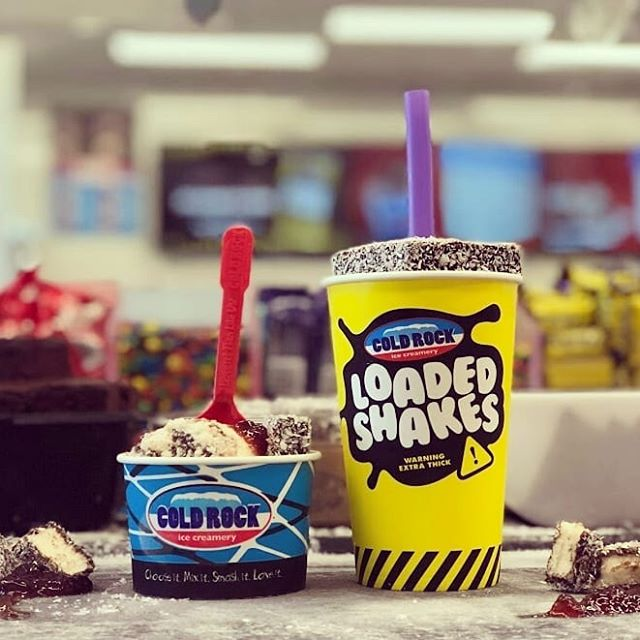
Sundae and loaded shake

The previous management team purchased the Australian Franchise System of Cold Rock in August 2002 and is attempting to present Cold Rock as the "premier ice cream franchise in Australia".

In 2008, Cold Rock opened its eightieth store in Melbourne, Victoria.

In September 2009, the Franchised Food Company, owned by businessman Stan Gordon, acquired all 87 Cold Rock ice-cream stores.

In May 2017 Cold Rock launched "Super Kosher" ice creams and mix-ins. It was the first time an Australian franchising targeted its products for the Jewish/kosher market.

In 2019, the chain was forced to close several stores due to rising costs, including stores in Indooroopilly and Springwood in Queensland, putting pressure on the franchise.
