= Pomme de pain =

French fast food chain

Pomme de Pain
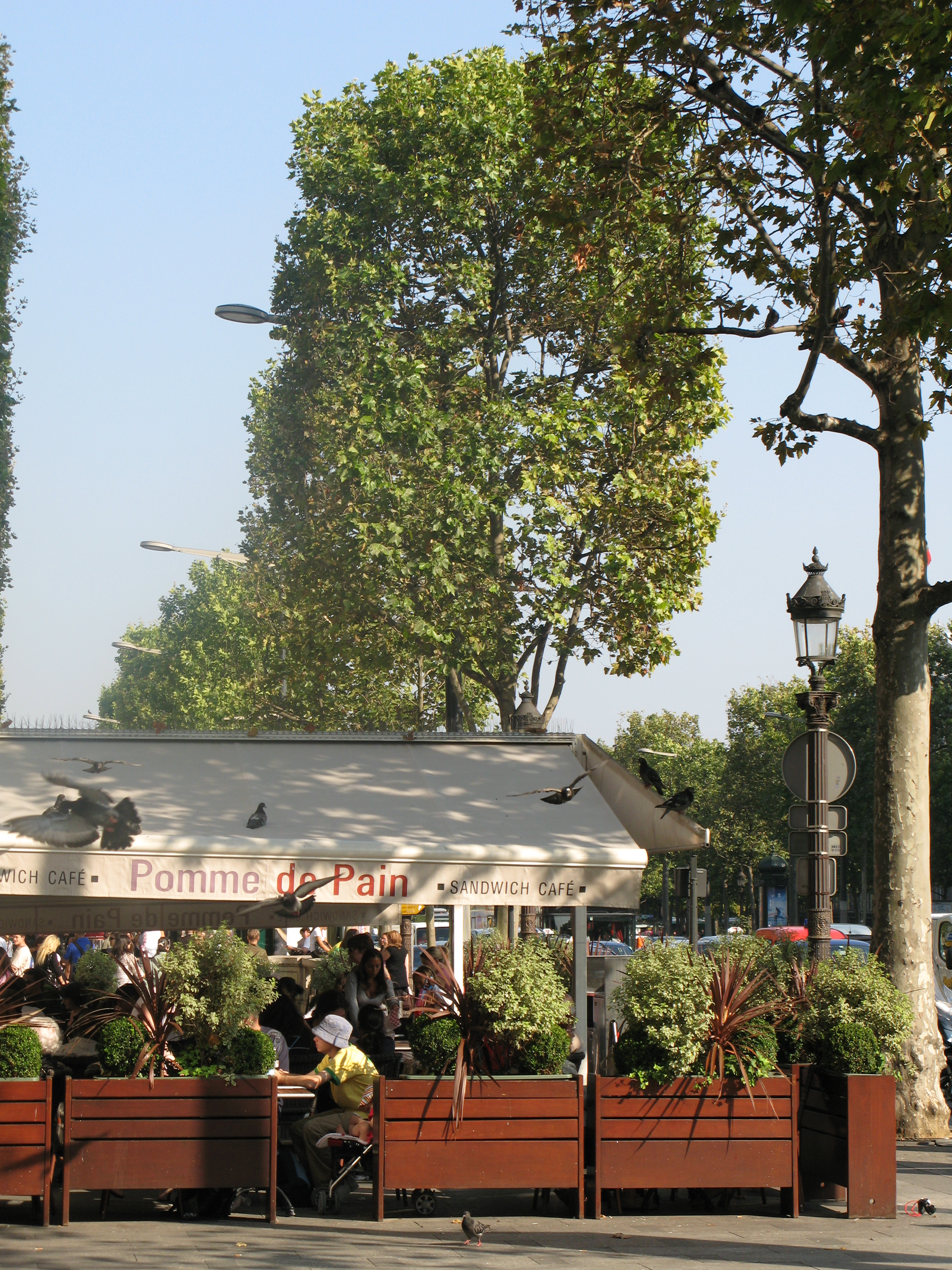
- Company type: Private
- Industry: Restaurant
- Genre: Fast Food
- Founded: 1980
- Headquarters: Paris, France, France
- Number of locations: 110+
- Products: Sandwiches and Pastries
- Website: pommedepain.fr

Pomme de Pain is a French fast-food chain serving traditional French sandwiches and pastries. It was founded in 1980 and today serves more than 12 million customers each year. In 2008, the company opened its first restaurant outside France in Casablanca, Morocco, and in December 2012, Pomme de Pain opened an outlet in Tunis, the capital of Tunisia. In 2011, the chain was put up for sale by Groupama. Hoping for a return to France, Burger King considered buying the chain, but ultimately, the company was purchased by the holding company of Alfred Neuhauser.
