= Office 1 Superstore =

Bulgarian retail company

Office 1 International, Inc.
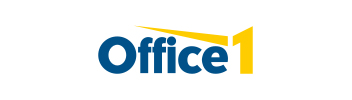

- Office 1 store in Sofia, Bulgaria
- Company type: Private
- Industry: Retail, Wholesale, Franchise
- Founded: 1989; 37 years ago
- Headquarters: Sofia, Bulgaria
- Products: Office supplies, Furniture, Electronics, Stationery
- Website: www.office1.bg

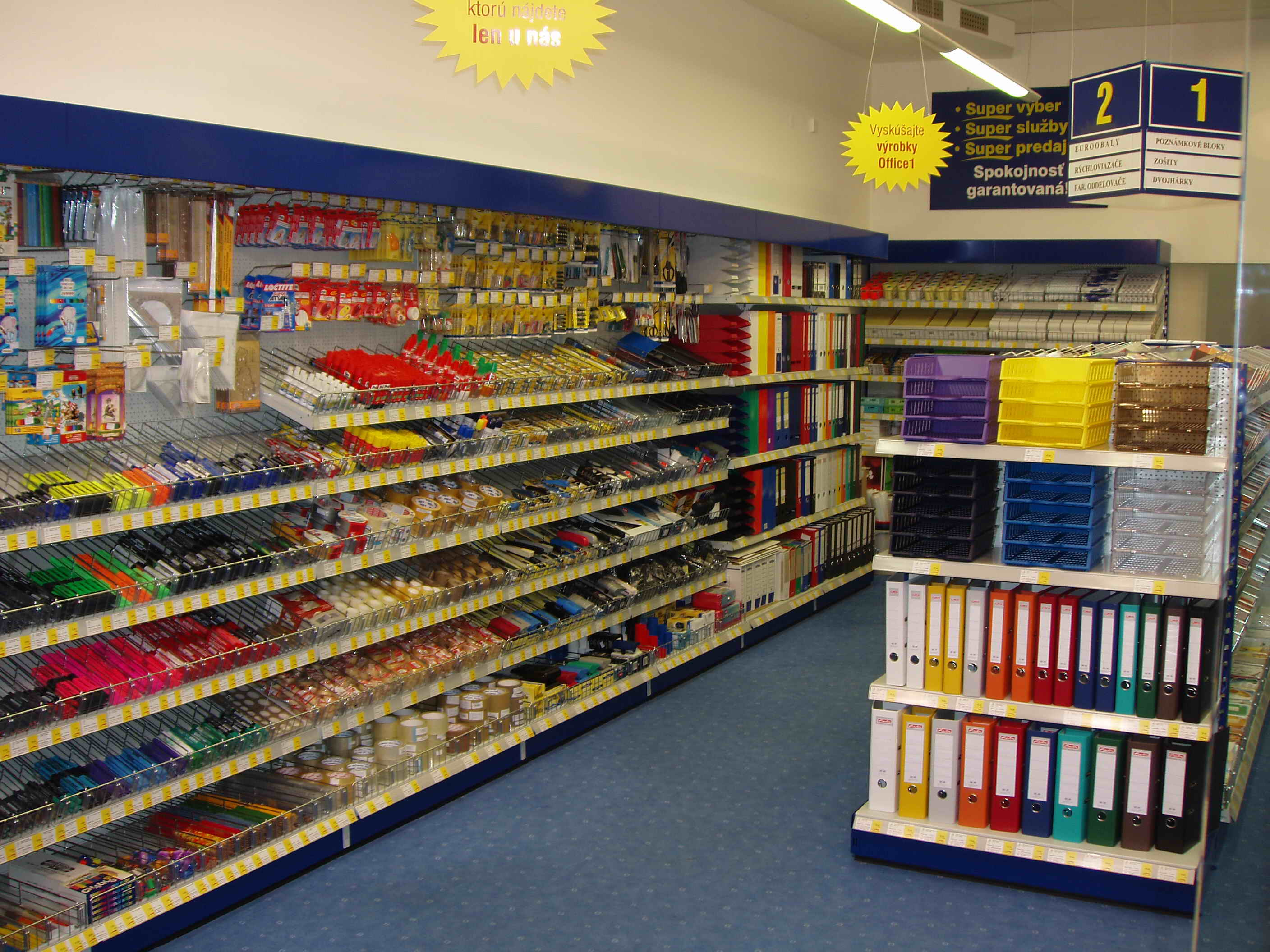
Typical Office 1 store interior

Office 1 International, Inc. (Office 1) is an international franchise company established in Florida, USA and currently present in 27 countries including Bulgaria, France, and Greece. It has over 600 locations. Office 1 was founded in 1989 by Mark Baccash. In 2018, Panda Cooperation, which had been the master franchisee for Bulgaria since 1998, acquired all the trademark rights of the Office 1 Superstore portfolio, establishing the group's operational headquarters in Sofia, Bulgaria.

The former American chain was based in Elk Grove, Illinois, and operated primarily in the Midwestern United States. The chain filed for bankruptcy in late 1996 and began liquidating locations by year's end.

== Office 1 Bulgaria ==
In 1998, the chain entered the Bulgarian market when Panda Cooperation received a master franchise for the territory of Bulgaria. The first Bulgarian Office 1 Superstore opened in 1998 in Sofia. Office 1 Superstore is the largest chain of stores for office supplies in Bulgaria with an extensive network of sub-franchisees and own stores.
