= Franchise 500 =

Listing of American franchising companies

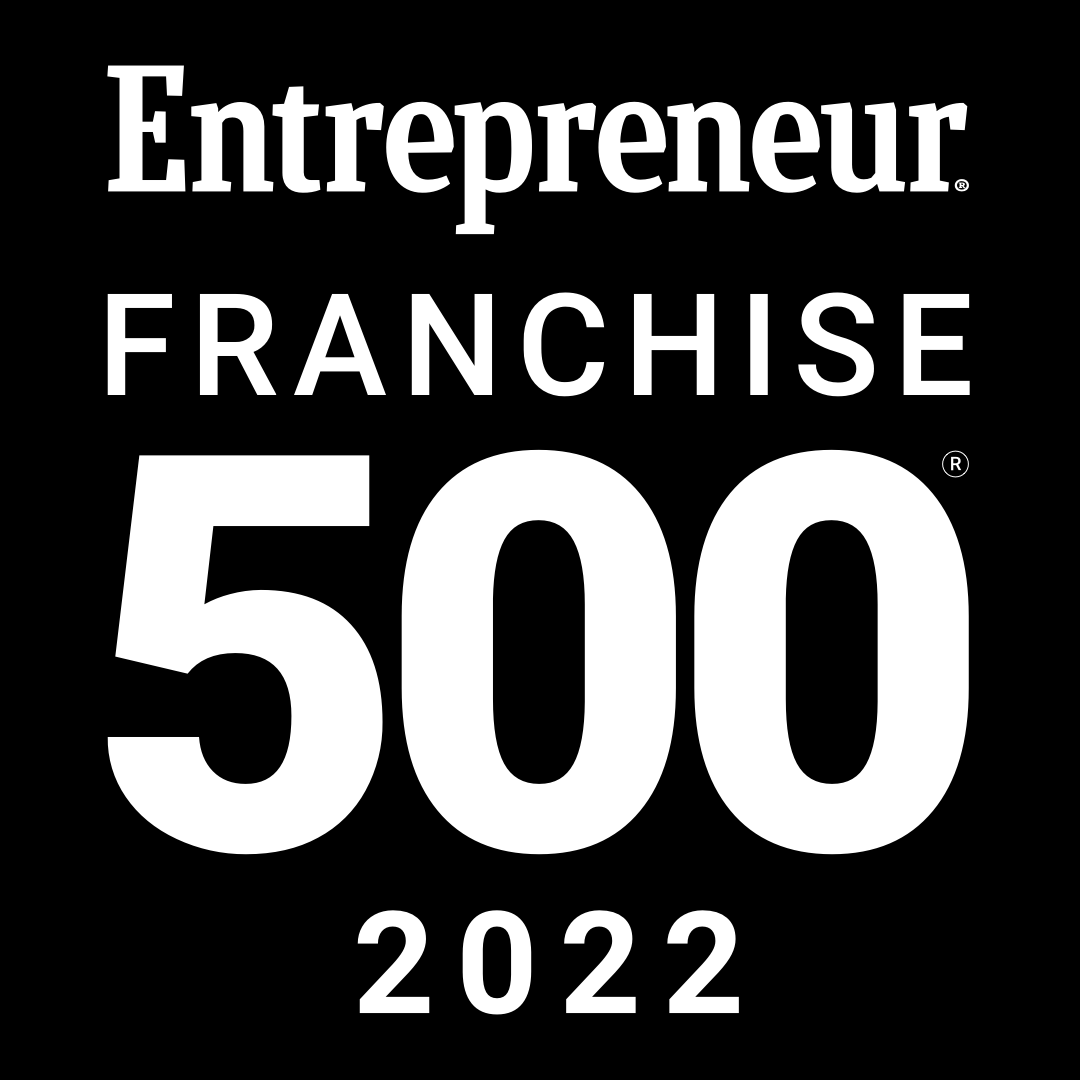
The 2022 logo for the Franchise 500

The Franchise 500 is an annual ranking of the top 500 franchising companies in the U.S. and Canada, compiled by Entrepreneur magazine through a submission and review process. The ranking is based on an evaluation of each company's costs and fees, size and growth, franchisee support, brand strength, and financial strength and stability. The list includes both public and privately held companies, and has been published annually since 1980.

== Qualifications ==
To be listed in the Franchise 500 issue, franchise companies must complete an online questionnaire, provide their franchise disclosure document, submit a list of all open and operating units, and include their most recent audited financials. To be ranked, a company must have a minimum of 10 units, with at least one located in the United States, and must be actively seeking new franchisees in the U.S. Additionally, the company cannot be in Chapter 11 bankruptcy. It is free to participate in the Franchise 500, and Entrepreneur receives over 1000 applications annually.

All qualifying applicants are evaluated and scored based on a formula that incorporates more than 150 data points. These areas include cost and fees, size and growth, franchisee support, brand strength, and financial strength and stability. Applicants with the highest cumulative scores will become the Franchise 500.

Besides the broad Franchise 500 ranking, Entrepreneur uses the submitted data to create lists for specialized categories, including "Fastest-Growing Franchises," "Best of the Best," and "Top New & Emerging Franchises." In previous editions, industry-specific lists were also available. For example, under "Automotive," there were several subcategories, including "Appearance Services," "Oil Change Services," and "Rentals and Sales."

== Rankings ==
- Franchise 500 – overall ranking of the most successful franchise companies of the year.

=== Additional Rankings ===
- Top Franchises for Veterans – franchises offering startup incentives for veterans
- Fastest-Growing Franchises – franchises with the greatest unit growth in the U.S. and Canada
- Fastest-Growing International Franchises – franchises with the greatest unit growth outside the U.S. and Canada
- Top New & Emerging Franchises – franchises that have been franchising for five years or less
- Top Global Franchises – franchises seeking to expand outside the U.S.
- Top Franchises for Less Than $50k – franchises that can be started for less than US$50,000
- Top Franchises for Less Than $100k – franchises that can be started for less than US$100,000
- Top Franchises for Less Than $150k – franchises that can be started for less than US$150,000
- Best of the Best – franchises that ranked in this year's Franchise 500 and also ranked #1 in their respective industries
- Top Food Franchises – franchises that ranked in this year's Franchise 500 and are also ranked #1 in their respective category
- Top Part-Time Franchises – franchises that can be run part-time or without full-time commitment
- Top Home-Based & Mobile – franchises that can be run from home or vehicle (with no need for office, retail or warehouse space)
- Top Franchises for Diversity, Equity, & Inclusion – franchises promoting diversity, equity and inclusion
- Top Brands for Multi-Unit Owners – franchises offering incentives for underrepresented groups

== 2025 list ==
In 2025, the ten companies that ranked at the top of the 500 were:

Rank	Company	Headquarters	Industry	Franchises (U.S.)	Total units (Global)	Investment (US$)
1	Taco Bell	(United States) Irvine, California	Food and Beverage	6,418	7,567	$611K – $4M
2	Jersey Mike's Subs	(United States) Manasquan, New Jersey	Food and Beverage	2,823	2,861	$204K – $1.3M
3	Dunkin' Donuts	(United States) Canton, Massachusetts	Food and Beverage	9,548	13,790	$436K – $1.8M
4	Popeyes Louisiana Kitchen	(United States) Miami, Florida	Food and Beverage	3,087	4,796	$471K – $3.9M
5	Ace Hardware	(United States) Oak Brook, Illinois	Hardware stores	4,830	5,965	$602K – $2M
6	The UPS Store	(United States) San Diego, California	Shipping	5,286	5,693	$216K – $609K
7	Culver's	(United States) Prairie du Sac, Wisconsin	Food and Beverage	1,020	1,020	$2.6M – $8.6M
8	Wendy's	(United States) Dublin, Ohio	Food and Beverage	5,622	7,282	$310K – $2.8M
9	Hampton By Hilton	(United States) McLean, Virginia	Hotel chain	2,364	3,040	$15.2M – $25.9M
10	Kumon	(United States) Rutherford, New Jersey	Education	1,701	25,563	$73,123 – $165K

== See also ==
- List of franchises
