= Cruise Planners =

American travel agency

- Type: Privately held company
- Founded: 1994
- Headquarters: Downtown Coral Springs, FL
- Key people: Michelle Fee (CEO); Theresa Scalzitti (COO); Brian Shultz (CIO); Scott Koepf (Chief Strategy Officer)
- Services: Travel agency services & travel franchises
- Owner: Michelle Fee
- Website: cruiseplanners.com cruiseplannersfranchise.com

Cruise Planners is a home-based travel agent franchise network. The company is headquartered in downtown Coral Springs, Florida. The company's travel agency franchisees specialize in booking luxury vacations, cruises, tours and travel to destinations around the world. The company has more than 2,500 franchise owners in all 50 states.

The company is a licensed travel agency, and a member of CLIA (Cruise Lines International Association), IFA (International Franchise Association), and ASTA (American Society of Travel Advisors).

== History ==
The company was co-founded by Marvin Davis, Michelle Fee, Lynn Korn in 1994 in Coral Springs, Florida. Prior to the retirement of Davis and Korn in 2007, their shares in the company were purchased by Palm Beach Capital.

In 2013, CEO Michelle Fee, the late COO Vicky Garcia and CFO Tom Kruszewski together purchased the company from Palm Beach Capital. In May 2022, Fee became the sole owner of Cruise Planners. The company has approximately 115 employees at their headquarters in Coral Springs, Florida.

In September 2022, Cruise Planners announced it would join Signature Travel Network, one of the travel industry's largest travel agency networks.

== Awards and recognition ==
Cruise Planners is the most awarded travel franchise company in the industry. Franchise Business Review awarded Cruise Planners "Best in Category" in 2021, 2022 and 2023 and Cruise Planners has been listed on Entrepreneur’s Annual Franchise 500 List since 2004. Cruise Planners was named #20 on Travel Weekly's 2023 Power List.

In 2019, the Broward County Commission proclaimed January 29th as "Cruise Planners Day" in recognition of the company's economic and positive impact on tourism and the community.
