= Signarama =

- Company type: Private, Subsidiary of United Franchise Group
- Industry: Advertising
- Genre: Signage
- Founded: 1986
- Founder: Ray Titus
- Headquarters: West Palm Beach, FL, US
- Number of locations: 661
- Area served: USA, Canada, UK, Mexico, Australia, New Zealand, South Africa, Singapore, Guatemala, India, Albania, France
- Key people: Ray Titus, CEO; Alex James Titus, President; Brady Lee, COO; Todd Newton, CFO; Max Taha, CTO
- Products: Signs, graphics, decals, displays, other visual communications
- Number of employees: 200
- Website: Official website

Signarama is an international sign and advertising franchise working under the United Franchise Group. Founded in the US in 1986, it now has franchises in 13 countries, including France, French Guiana, and Australia. It has been named 249th in the 2018 top 500 Franchises in the US by Entrepreneur magazine. It also ranked third in the top franchise for veterans category for 2014-15 by Franchising USA. It possesses 387 US locations and 274 across the globe.

== History ==
Signarama was founded in 1986 by Ray and Roy Titus. Its first store opened in Farmingdale, New York, with a second location opening in North Palm Beach, Florida less than a year later. It counts with over 200 employees working from offices in five countries to support 695 locations around the world. Some of their franchises have recently upgraded their equipment to produce accessible signage, including braille and 3D printing capabilities.
