= Sour Sally =

Indonesian frozen yogurt franchise

- Type: Franchise
- Industry: Restaurant
- Founded: 15 May 2008
- Founder: Donny Pramono
- Headquarters: Jakarta, Indonesia
- Key people: Donny Pramono (CEO)
- Products: Frozen yogurt Smoothies
- Website: https://soursally.co.id

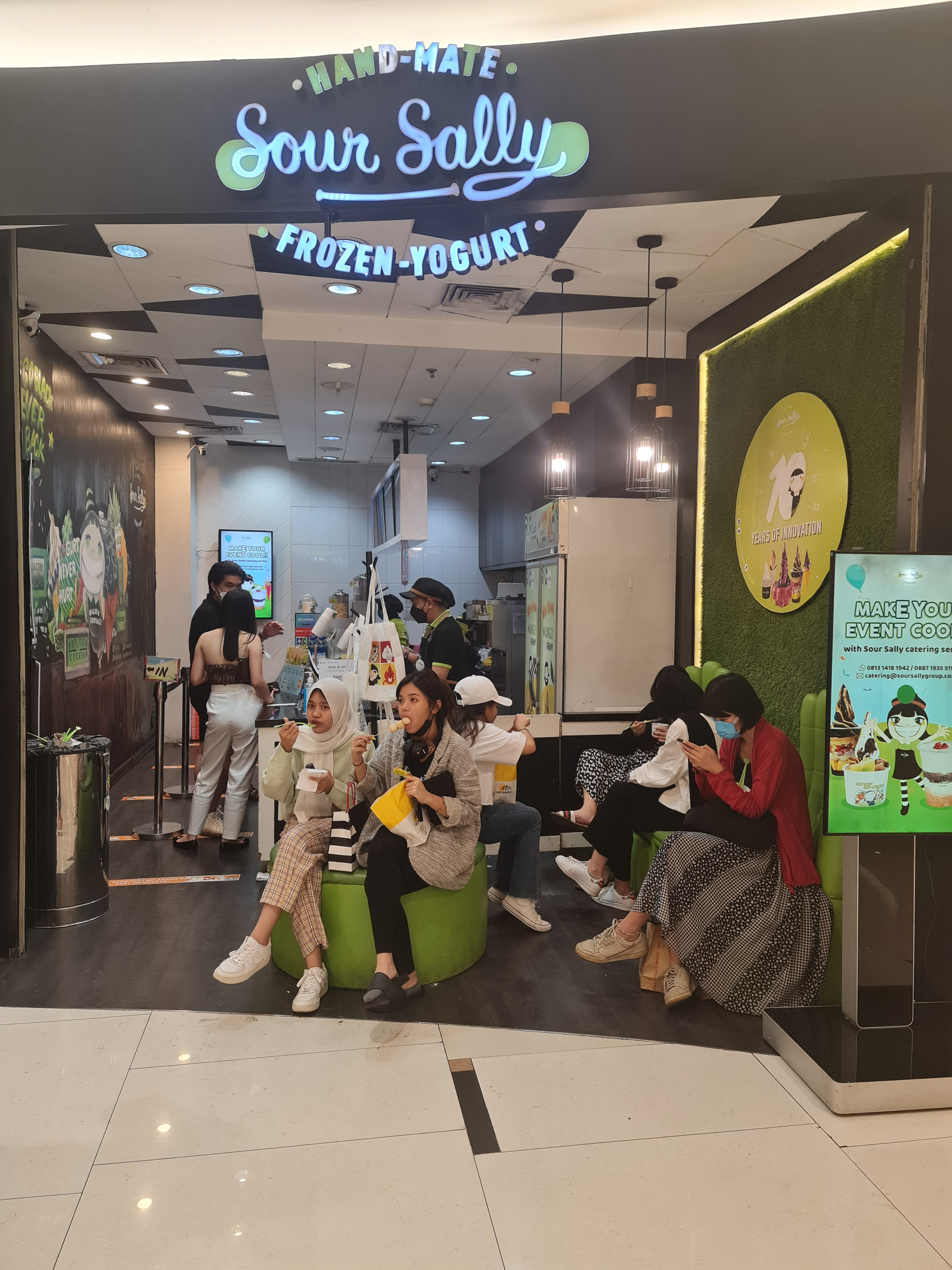
A Sour Sally outlet in Senayan City, Central Jakarta

Sour Sally is a frozen yogurt franchise in Indonesia.

It was founded by Donny Pramono, who is also as the CEO.

In 2012, Sour Sally carried out business development by launching the Sour Sally Mini franchise.

Sour Sally Mini comes with a 3x3 meter outlet concept located in non-premium places with high traffic and affordable products for the middle segment.

This new franchise is in contrast to Sour Sally, which is present in premium locations with a boutique outlet concept.

As of 2023, Sour Sally operates its boutique outlets in Medan, Palembang, Pekanbaru, Cilegon, Jakarta, Bandung, Semarang, Yogyakarta, Surakarta, Surabaya, Denpasar, Kupang, Banjarmasin, and Makassar.
