= Fully Promoted =

U.S based franchise specializing in custom embroidery and screen painting

- Formerly: EmbroidMe
- Company type: Franchise
- Industry: Embroidery, Promotional merchandise
- Founded: 2000
- Founder: Ray Titus, CEO of United Franchise Group
- Headquarters: West Palm Beach, Florida, U.S.
- Key people: Andrew Titus, President
- Products: Embroidery, Garment printing, Promotional merchandise
- Parent: United Franchise Group
- Website: Official website

Fully Promoted (formerly EmbroidMe) is a U.S.-based franchise that specializes in custom embroidery and screen printing. Founded in 2000, it is part of the United Franchise Group. It offers promotional products and services such as monogramming. As of 2025, it has 270 locations worldwide.

== History ==
Fully Promoted was founded as EmbroidMe in 2000 by Ray Titus in West Palm Beach, Florida. He had previously founded the company Sign-A-Rama in the 1980s.

In 2002, the company launched its first foreign store, and by 2003 had 100 franchise locations. By 2014 it was the largest promotional product franchise with over 300 locations in 12 countries.

In 2017 EmbroidMe rebranded as Fully Promoted. As of 2025, it has 270 locations worldwide.
