= Electrodry =

Electrodry is a carpet cleaning franchise organisation based in Newcastle, New South Wales. Electrodry was founded in 1983 by Paul Burchell. In 1984, Electrodry started franchising its operations with the sale of the first franchise in Gosford. Electrodry expanded operations to have 100 franchise members in 2009. Electrodry also has operations in New Zealand and for the period from 1987 to 1989 had operations in the United States.

Electrodry uses a system of carpet cleaning called bonnet cleaning, generically referred to as carpet dry cleaning. Electrodry manufactures the main chemicals used in the Electrodry carpet cleaning system.

Electrodry services include upholstery cleaning, mattress cleaning and tile cleaning. Electrodry is a certified firm of The Clean Trust, which is the unofficial governing body of the carpet cleaning industry. From 2009 to 2015 Electrodry was endorsed by the National Asthma Council's Sensitive Choice program for a range of services including carpet cleaning.

In 2015, the Federal Court fined Electrodry for fake reviews following action by the Australian Competition & Consumer Commission.
