= Mister Transmission =

Canadian franchise company

Mister Transmission (International) Ltd.
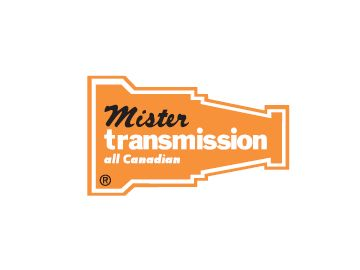

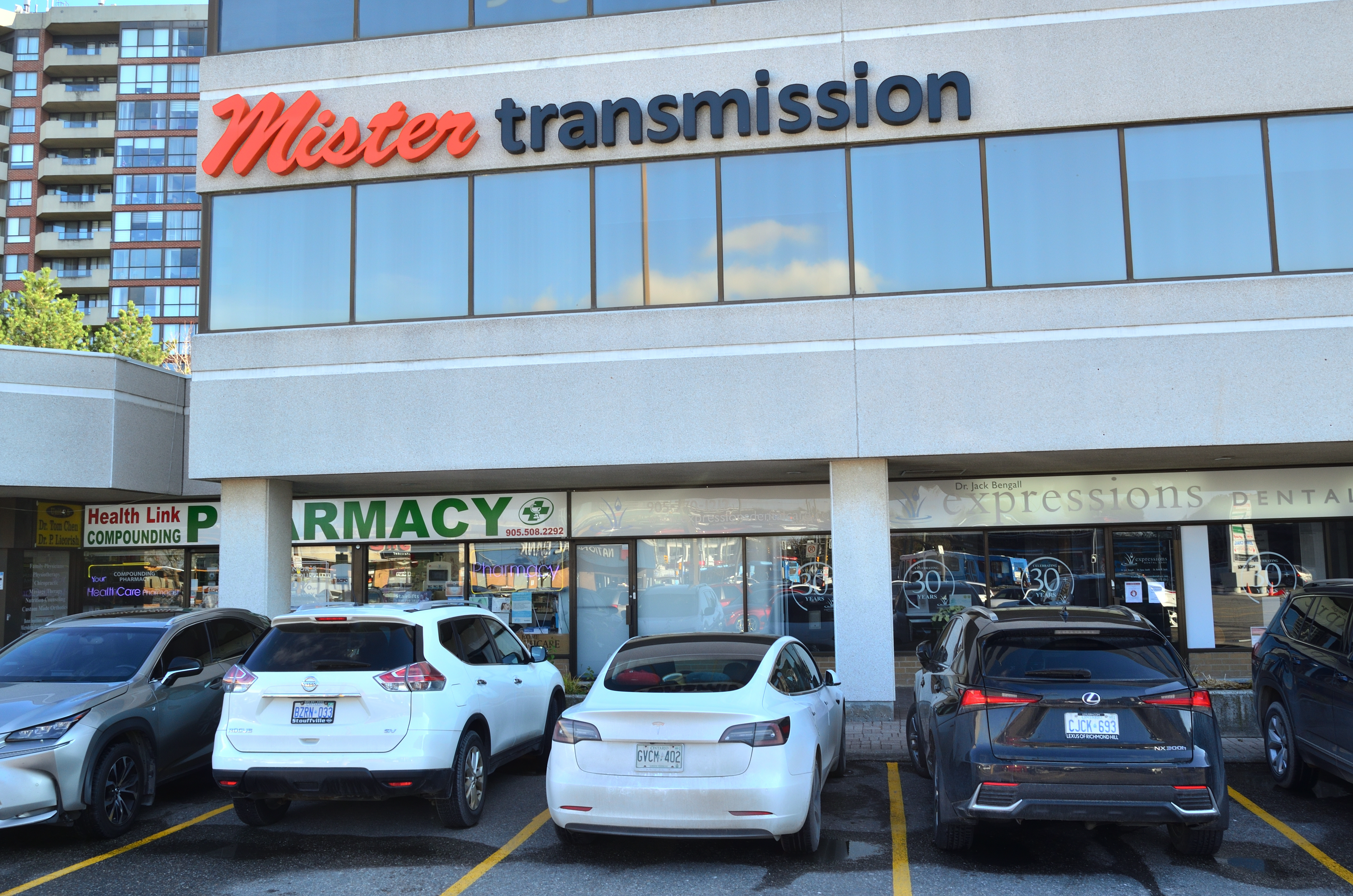
- Mister Transmission headquarters in Richmond Hill, Ontario
- Founded: 1963
- Founder: Bruce Brillinger, Jerry Etkin
- Headquarters: Richmond Hill, Ontario, Canada
- Number of locations: 65
- Services: Maintenance, Repair, and Operations
- Owner: Responsive Brands Inc.
- Website: www.mistertransmission.com

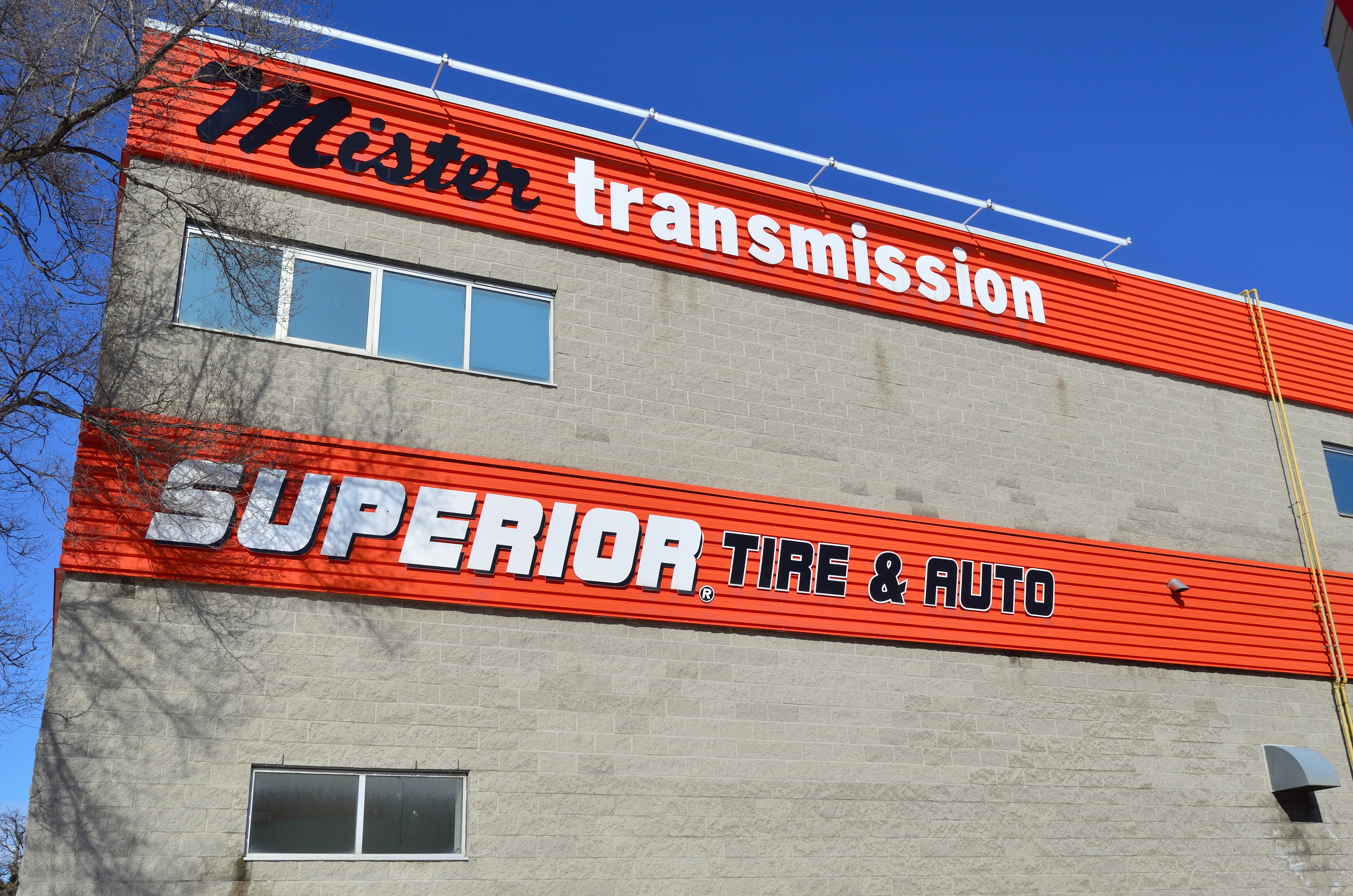
Mister Transmission in Richmond Hill, Ontario

Mister Transmission (International) Ltd is a Canadian franchise company specializing in repairing transmissions. Founded in 1963 by Jerry Etkin and Bruce Brillinger, Mister Transmission first opened in Richmond Hill, Ontario. Ownership of Mister Transmission changed in 2013 and is now owned by Responsive Brands, a private investment company.

== Overview ==
The founders saw an opening for a niche market requiring specialized service and decided to invest in it. People now had the option to get their transmissions fixed by a specialist rather than a general mechanic. The company currently has 65 franchises across Canada and is still expanding. The headquarters are located in Richmond Hill, Ontario and their franchisees employ over 300 people across Canada.

== History ==
Brillinger was a mechanic at a gas station who saw the need in 1963 for a market fixing transmissions. That is when the partnership began between the two founders; Etkin was an entrepreneur who funded the business while Brillinger worked the mechanics. When starting the business, the pair was looking to name the company and looked down the street to where a "Mister Donut" was operating. Etkin joking, said to name it "Mister Transmission". Mister Transmission started franchising in 1969 after the pair had opened and managed stores in four additional locations: Barrie, North Bay, Brampton, and Burlington.

== Services ==
=== Transmission maintenance ===
Mister Transmission performs multi-check inspections. These inspections include: checking the transmission fluid, a road test, a lift inspection checking: neutral switch, engine rpm, throttle linkage, modulators, transmission mounts, u-joints, fluid retention, and electronic controls, while also doing a pan inspection which checks the inside of the transmission.

=== Transmission Repair ===
This includes adjustments, replacing, and re-building. They also offer roadside assistance and vehicle pick-up when needed.

== Franchises ==
Edmonton, Alberta; Red Deer, Alberta; Calgary, Alberta; Winnipeg, Manitoba (2); Halifax, Nova Scotia; Gatineau, Québec; Hull, Québec; Kamloops, British Columbia; Abbotsford, British Columbia; Langley, British Columbia; Coquitlam, British Columbia; Surrey, British Columbia; Burnaby, British Columbia; North Vancouver, British Columbia; Moncton, New Brunswick; Regina, Saskatchewan; Ottawa, Ontario; Kanata, Ontario; Kingston, Ontario; Belleville, Ontario; Peterborough, Ontario; Lindsay, Ontario; Oshawa, Ontario; Niagara Falls, Ontario; Whitby, Ontario; Pickering, Ontario; St. Catharines, Ontario	Toronto, Ontario (5); Markham, Ontario; Richmond Hill, Ontario; North York, Ontario; Newmarket, Ontario; Mississauga, Ontario (4); Woodbridge, Ontario; Orillia, Ontario; Hamilton, Ontario (2); Burlington, Ontario; Brampton, Ontario; Barrie, Ontario; Milton, Ontario; North Bay, Ontario; Orangeville, Ontario; Brantford, Ontario; Cambridge, Ontario; Guelph, Ontario; Kitchener, Ontario (2); Waterloo, Ontario; Woodstock, Ontario; St. Thomas, Ontario; Owen Sound, Ontario; London, Ontario; Sudbury, Ontario; Timmins, Ontario; Sault Ste. Marie, Ontario; Thunder Bay, Ontario

== Charity ==
In May 2014, Mister Transmission became a national supporter of the Canadian Breast Cancer Foundation. They have committed to a $50,000 donation each year. In 2014 they raised a total of $80,000. In 2015 they raised $62,000. In 2016 they raised over $60,000.

== Awards ==
- Canadian Franchise Association- Franchisee Choice Award (2015), (2016)
- Richmond Hill Business Chamber of Commerce - Mayors Award(2010) & Business Excellence Award (2012)
