= Nirala Sweets =

Defunct confectionery chain in Pakistan

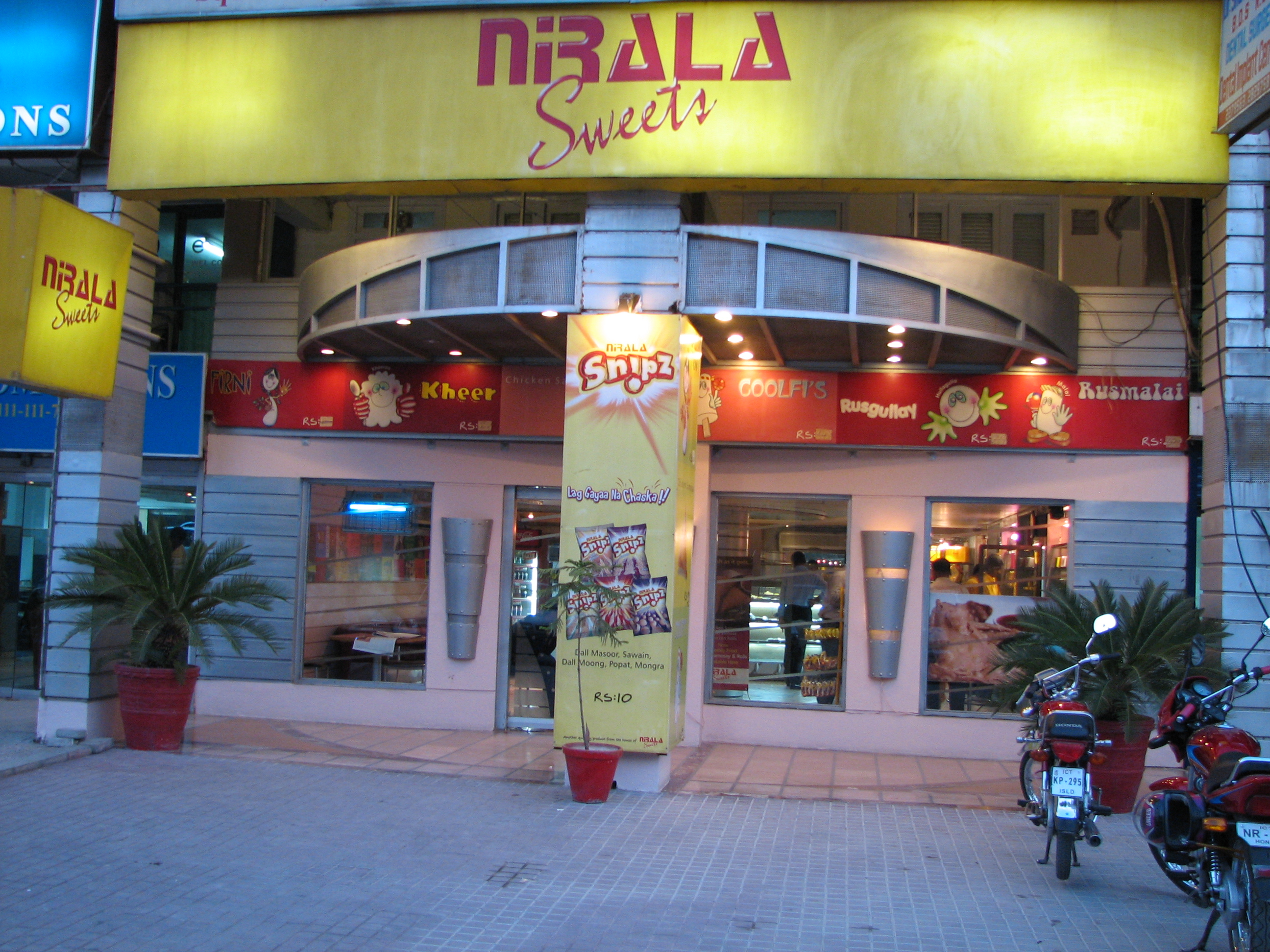
- Type: Private
- Industry: Bakers
- Founded: 1948; 78 years ago
- Founder: Taj Din
- Defunct: 2016
- Fate: Bankruptcy
- Headquarters: Lahore, Pakistan
- Number of locations: 22 outlets in Pakistan, 2 in the UAE
- Key people: Taj Din (founder owner of family business); Farooq Ahmed (son); Faisal Farooq and Ahmer Farooq (grandchildren and managing directors of business)
- Products: Sweets, snacks, dairy, beverages

Nirala Sweets was a confectionery chain store based in Lahore, Pakistan. It had 22 stores across various Pakistani cities, with 15 in the city of Lahore, and two stores in the UAE (one in Dubai and one in Sharjah).

== History ==
Taj Din, the company founder. originally was a seller of woollen shawls in Kashmir. Taj Din also used to bind copies of the Guru Granth Sahib, the holy book of the Sikhs, at a publishing house in Amritsar, Punjab, British India before migrating to Lahore, Pakistan after the independence of Pakistan in 1947. Then he worked as a binder at Taj Book Publisher and saved up some money to open up his own small shop selling halwa poori and mithai (breakfast and sweets) called Nirala Sweets at Fleming Road, Lahore in 1948. Soon Taj Din earned a reputation for high quality and delicious food and many people were travelling great distances to eat at his small shop in Lahore.

It was traditional, in the early 1950s, for shops to sell breakfast (halwa poori and cholay with tea) in the mornings and mithai (sweets) in the evenings.

== Business expansion ==
When Taj Din's eldest son Farooq Ahmed joined the business later, he took inspiration from European business models in the similar fields and the business started expanding on a grand scale.

The company sold traditional mithai and its own branded snacks, dairy products and beverages. At selected outlets (Jail Road/Lahore, Dubai, Sharjah) they also served traditional breakfast, including puris, suji halva, chaney, lassi and Masala chai.

In the late 1980s, Farooq Ahmed was diagnosed with parkinson's disease and his eldest son, Faisal Farooq, took over the active control of the business at a young age of 20. The company still continued to make progress and thrive.

== Business shut-down ==
This company was defunct in 2016. The downfall of the company started when it took a huge loan from the bank to set up a dairy factory. The company was not able to pay back this loan. Financial troubles and personal emotional stresses kept piling up that eventually resulted in the shut-down of this business in 2016.

== Products ==
- Halwa poori and Cholay (breakfast foods)
- Ras malai (milk dumplings)
- Barfi (milk fudge)
- Gulab jamun
- Chum Chum
- Patisa
- Rubri
- Jalebi
- Laddu
