= 5àsec =

Franchising network for cleaning and ironing clothes

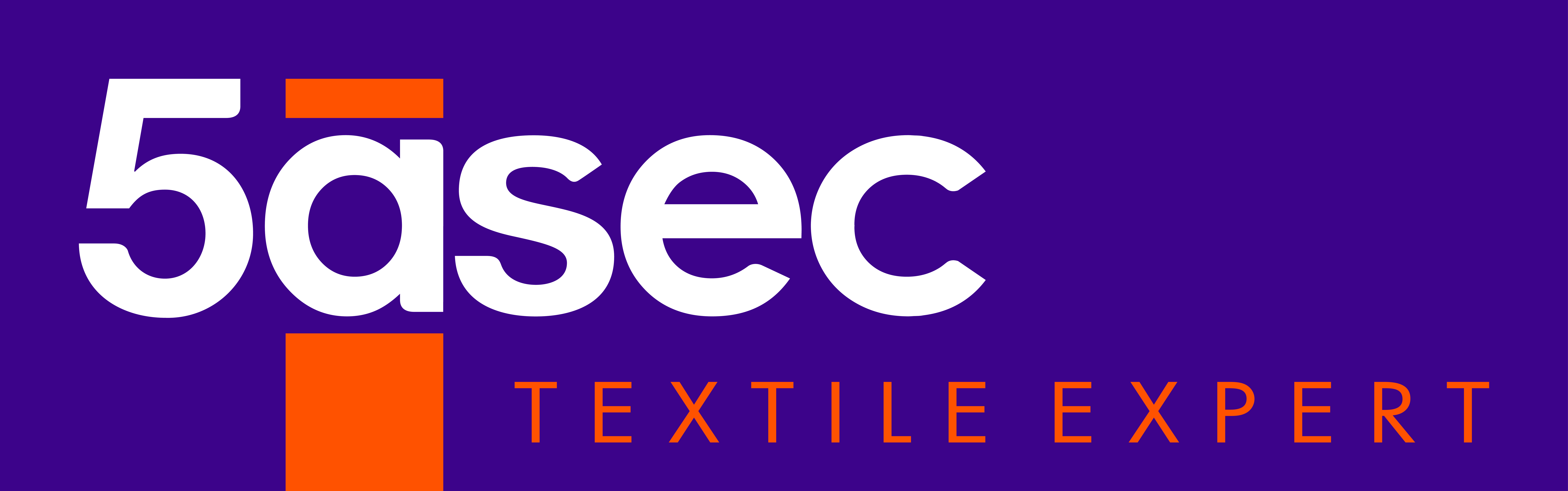

- Countries with 5àSec shops
- Formerly: 5 à Sec
- Founded: 1968, France
- Services: Cleaning and ironing
- Parent: 5àsec Group SAS
- Website: 5asec.com

5àsec (French: Cinq à sec [sɛ̃k a sɛk]) is a franchising network specialized in cleaning and ironing clothes.

== History ==
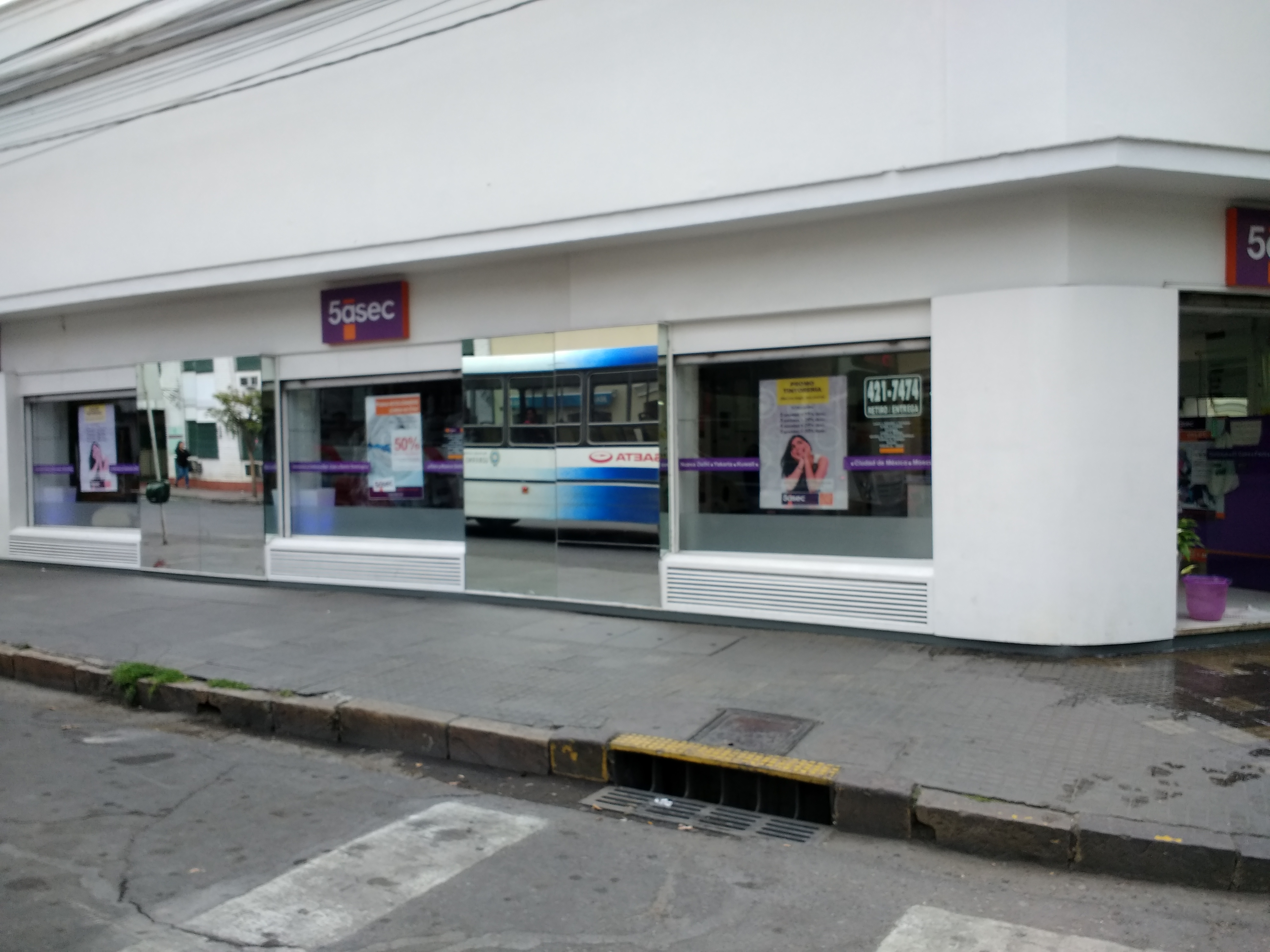
A 5àsec shop at Salta, Argentina.

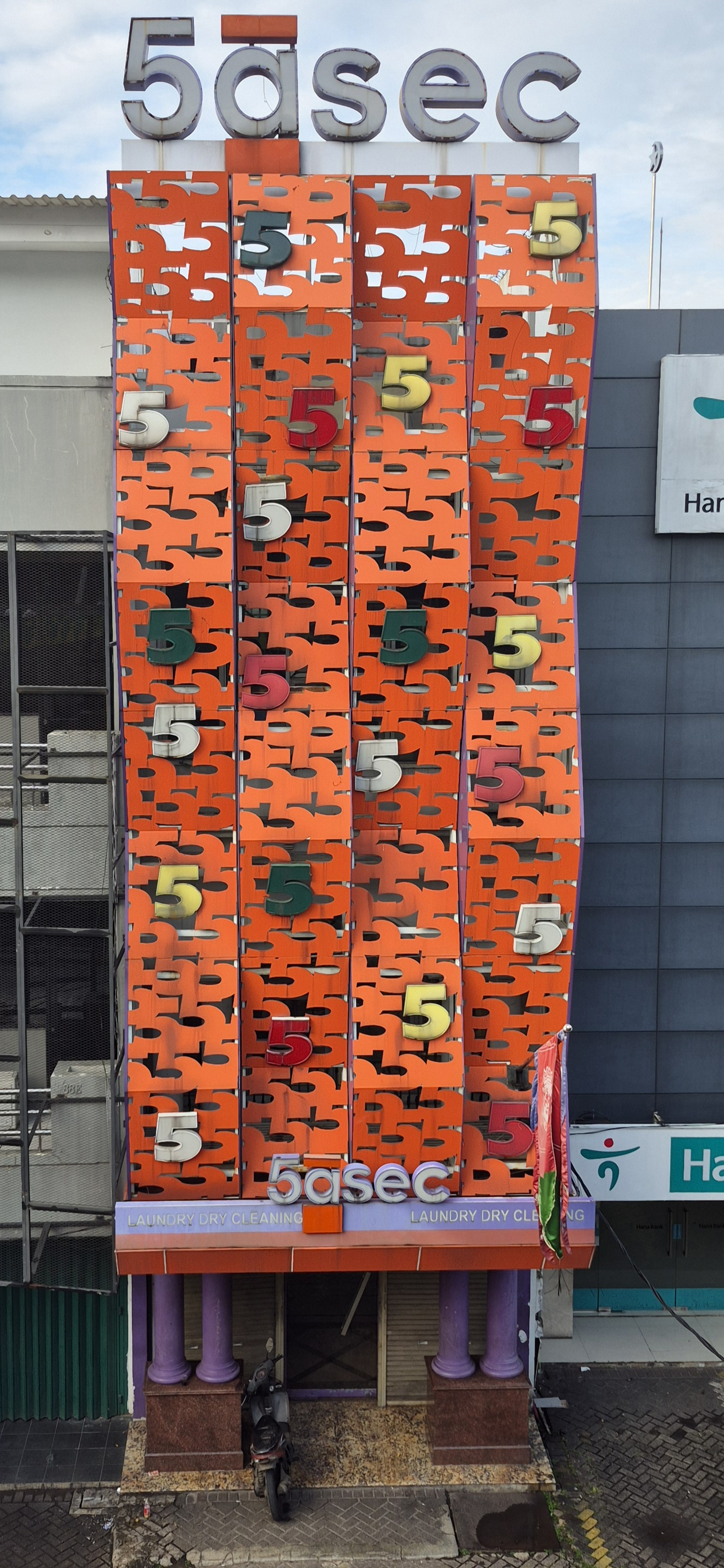
A 5àsec shop in Jakarta.

Founded in Marseille in 1968, the name "5 à sec" (literally "5 to dry") comes from the five pricing levels in use back then. The 5àsec network grew rapidly through franchising, and within the first 15 years reached the number of 580 shops, making it one of the largest franchise networks in its field of operation.

In the 1970s, 5àsec began its international expansion, through master-franchisees in neighboring French-speaking countries: Belgium, Luxembourg and Switzerland. In the 1990s, 5àsec expanded to the Iberian Peninsula (Portugal, Spain), and then South America, specifically, Argentina and Brazil.

In the 2000s, the company made major acquisitions of franchisees and master-franchisees, particularly within multiple countries in Central and Eastern Europe. The number of 5àsec locations doubled, at a rate of 100 new outlets per year. In 2009, David Sztabholz became CEO, and promoted the development of the company in growing markets, with acquisitions of master-franchises in Brazil (2010), and expanding to India (2010), Egypt (2011), and Colombia (2011).

As of 2012, 5àsec had nearly two thousand locations, and close to 7,000 employees, serving more than 120,000 customers per day worldwide.
