= Çiğköftem =

Turkish fast food chain selling vegan çiğ köfte

- Introduced: 1993
- Website: cigkoftem.com

Çiğköftem is a Turkish fast food chain and franchise that mainly sells vegan çiğ köfte. The chain also sells products with cow's milk dairy and is overall certified with the vegetarian V-Label. In 2020, the brand encompassed around 130 restaurants.

The company that operates Çiğköftem, EM Group, was founded in 1993 in Istanbul by brothers Erdoğan, Ahmet and Yavuz Güner. It started as a supplier of çiğ köfte for supermarkets, and opened the first Çiğköftem restaurant in 2005. The chain opened its first branch outside Turkey in 2009 in Belgium and, as of 2021, has branches in Germany, England, France, the Netherlands, Austria and Azerbaijan. The company is registered in Turkey and Germany.
