= Stockade Companies =

American multi-concept restaurant company

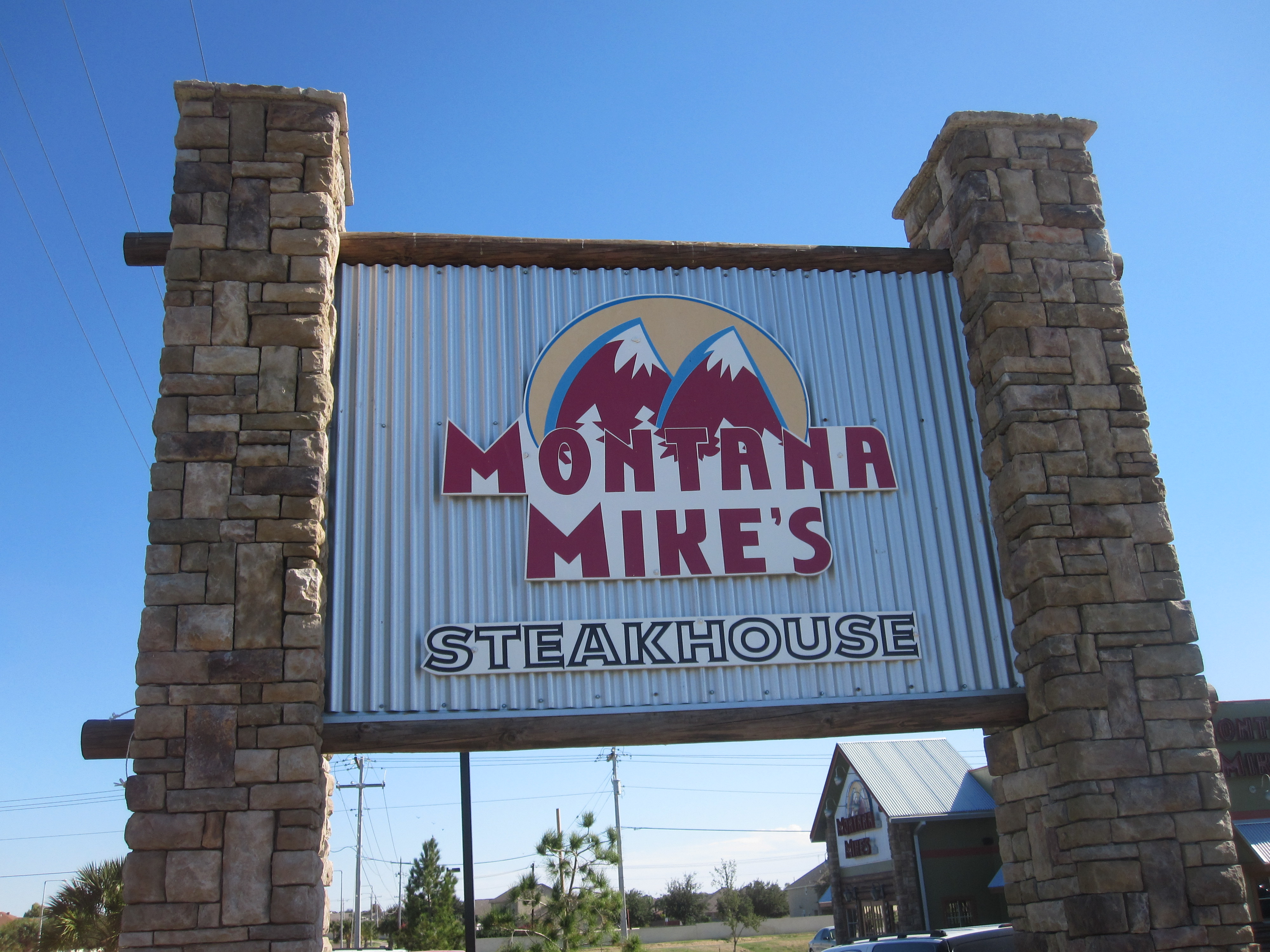
Montana Mike's Steakhouse sign

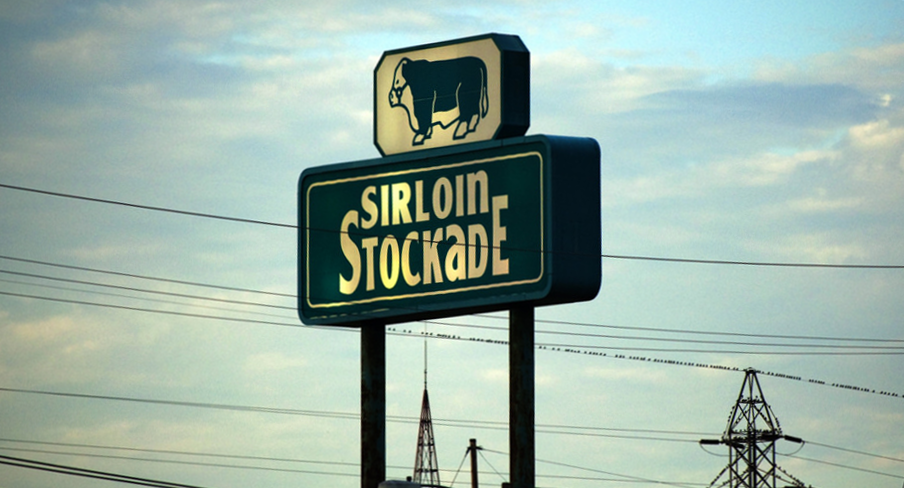
Sirloin Stockade sign

Stockade Companies, LLC is a privately held multi-concept restaurant company based in Round Rock, Texas.

The company operates under three brands:

- Sirloin Stockade, which operates as a steakhouse and buffet restaurant, and is notable for the large cows outside many of its locations,
- Montana Mike's, which operates as a more upscale steakhouse, notably for its restaurants resembling Rocky Mountain cabins, and
- WingMe.

As of May 2026, the company operates eight Sirloin Stockade locations (four in Texas, two in Missouri, and one each in Oklahoma and Kentucky) and seven Montana Mike's locations (three in Indiana, two in Oklahoma, and one each in Iowa and Texas).

== History ==
The company was established in 1984 by a group of Sirloin Stockade franchisees. The Sirloin Stockade brand dates back to 1966 in Oklahoma City, Oklahoma.

In 2008, Tom Ford became the CEO of Stockade Companies. Ford began working for the company on its first day in 1966 as a dishwasher at the debut Sirloin Stockade restaurant in Oklahoma City. Ford worked in additional positions while attending college and later purchased a Sirloin Stockade restaurant in 1979 in the Austin, Texas area.

The company also operated under the Coyote Canyon name, but the last such restaurant, located in Bradley, Illinois, closed on June 2, 2020, due to the COVID-19 pandemic.
