= Kailash Parbat =

Casual restaurant chain

- Company type: Private Limited
- Industry: Food
- Founded: 1940
- Founder: Mulchandani Brothers
- Headquarters: Mumbai, Maharashtra, India
- Area served: India, Canada, Qatar, Hong Kong, Singapore, United States, Germany, Kenya, Thailand, Portugal Netherlands, Malaysia, Saudi Arabia and Switzerland
- Key people: Kamlesh Mulchandani (MD), Amit Mulchandani (MD), Jai Mulchandani (MD), Manoj Mulchandani (MD)
- Website: www.kailashparbatgroup.com

Kailash Parbat is an Indian multi cuisine and casual restaurant chain, founded in 1940 by the Mulchandani Brothers, headquartered in Mumbai, India. Kailash Parbat operates its own retail chain stores and a variety of eateries throughout India, Singapore, Hong Kong, Qatar, Kenya, Portugal, Canada, the United States, Germany, the Netherlands, Malaysia, Saudi Arabia and Switzerland.

== History ==
In 1940, the Mulchandani Brothers began by specializing in Panipuri, Chaats, and Ragda pattice in Karachi, British India.

After great struggle they migrated to Mumbai, India, after partition, and opened their first outlet in Colaba, Bombay in 1952.

The Mulchandani Brothers' sons took over the family business and developed the original Sindhi cuisine in 1975. In 1985 they introduced outdoor catering. In 1991, the menu expanded with Bombay Pav bhaji and Northern Chole bhature. In 2005, Mulchandani's third generation continued the family business and renamed it "Kailash Parbat," with a redesigned interior and the introduction of innovative cuisine and plating.

In 2010, the franchisee model was implemented by the company in Chennai. Simultaneously, the first international outlet opened in Singapore.

In 2014 Kailash Parbat outlets opened in New York and London, as well as Gujarat, Telangana, and Karnataka.

By 2023 the company had expanded into other countries, including Canada, Qatar, Hong Kong, Kenya, Thailand, Portugal and the Netherlands.

== Awards ==
- ET HospitalityWorld Restaurant and Nightlife Awards 2022
- Iconic Brands Of Maharashtra Awards 2022
