= Pinot's Palette =

- Industry: Paint and Sip
- Founded: May 8, 2009
- Headquarters: Houston, Texas
- Number of locations: 140+ (as of January 2018)
- Key people: Craig Ceccanti, CEO and co-founder
- Website: www.pinotspalette.com

Pinot's Palette is an American national paint and sip franchise headquartered in Houston, Texas. Founded in 2009, Pinot's Palette offers step-by-step group art lessons accompanied by wine or cocktails.

As of January 2018, Pinot's Palette has over 140 stores in 31 states, plus one location in Toronto.

== History ==
Pinot's Palette was founded in 2009 by business partners Craig Ceccanti, Charles Willis, and Beth Willis. Ceccanti says he got the idea for starting the business after he attended a painting class in Louisiana with his family.

The first Pinot's Palette studio opened in Houston's Montrose neighborhood in 2009. The studio was originally named “Pinot and Picasso.” The name was changed to “Pinot’s Palette” in 2010.

After opening two additional locations in the Houston area, the company began franchising. The first franchised Pinot's Palette studio opened in Katy, Texas in 2010. Since then, the company has expanded nationwide.

In June 2016, Pinot's Palette launched a rebranding effort. This rebranding effort introduced a new logo, and updated studio décor.

In February 2023, Pinot's Palette was purchased by FranchiCzar, LLC; this made the company the fourth brand under their 4E Brands umbrella.

== Operations and Financials ==
Pinot's Palette offers two- or three-hour group painting classes accompanied by wine or cocktails. Depending on state liquor laws, customers can either bring their own wine or alcoholic beverages or purchase them on-site. The company also offers corporate events and private parties.

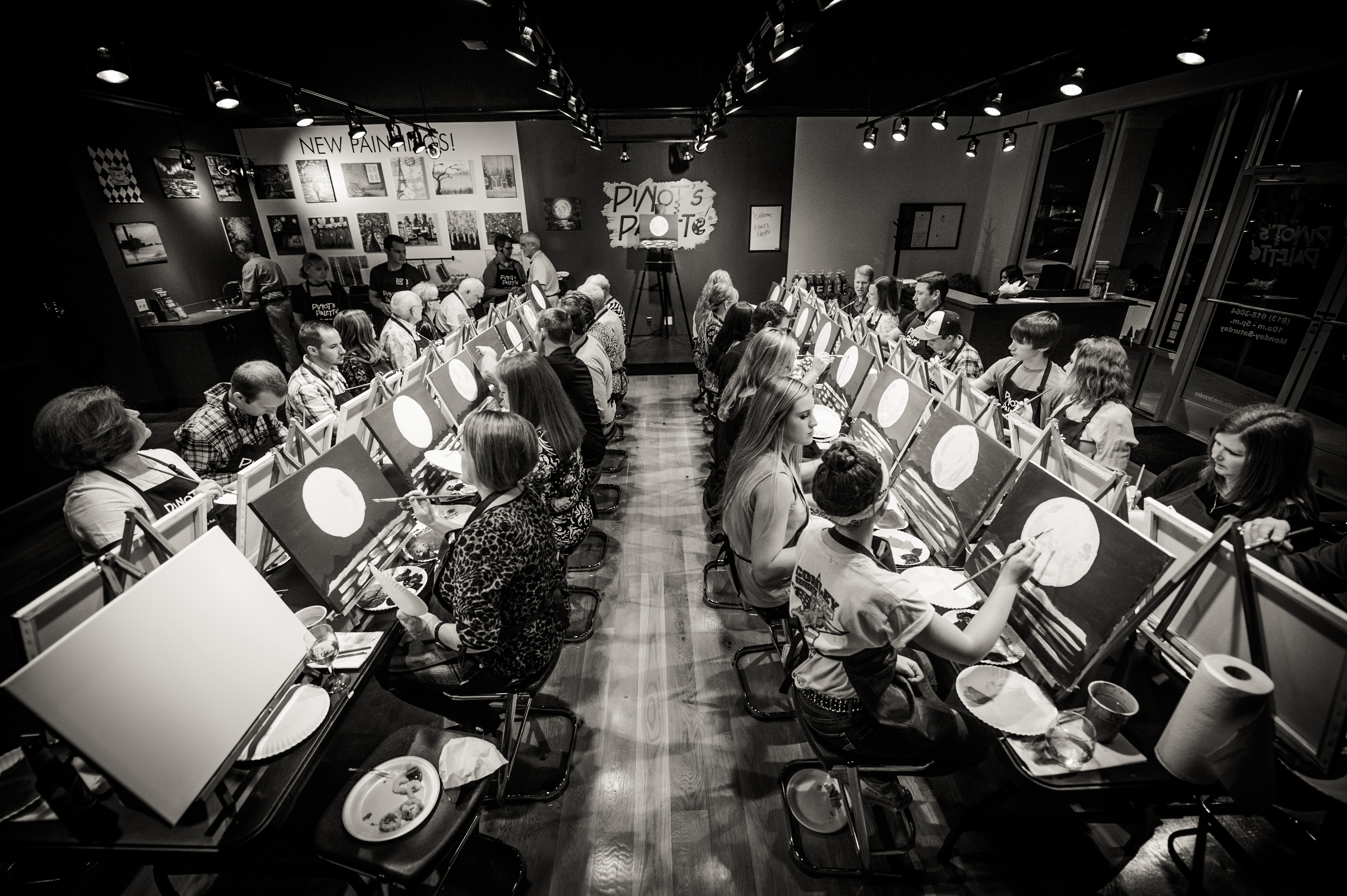
A painting class at Pinot's Palette

The company does not require franchisees to have backgrounds in wine or art.
