= The Melting Pot (restaurant) =

North American fondue chain

- Industry: Restaurant
- Founded: April 1975
- Founder: Mark Johnson; Mike Johnson
- Headquarters: Tampa, Florida, United States
- Number of locations: 95 franchises (as of 2026)
- Area served: United States, Canada
- Key people: John Crawford (CEO); Bob Johnson (chairman)
- Services: Casual dining, specializing in fondue
- Website: www.meltingpot.com

The Melting Pot is a chain of franchised fondue restaurants in the United States and Canada. The Tampa, Florida based company has 95 locations as of May 2026. The Melting Pot menu contains various cheese fondues, wines, salads, entrees of meat and seafood served with dipping sauces and oil or broth to be cooked in, and chocolate fondues. It is part of Front Burner Brands.

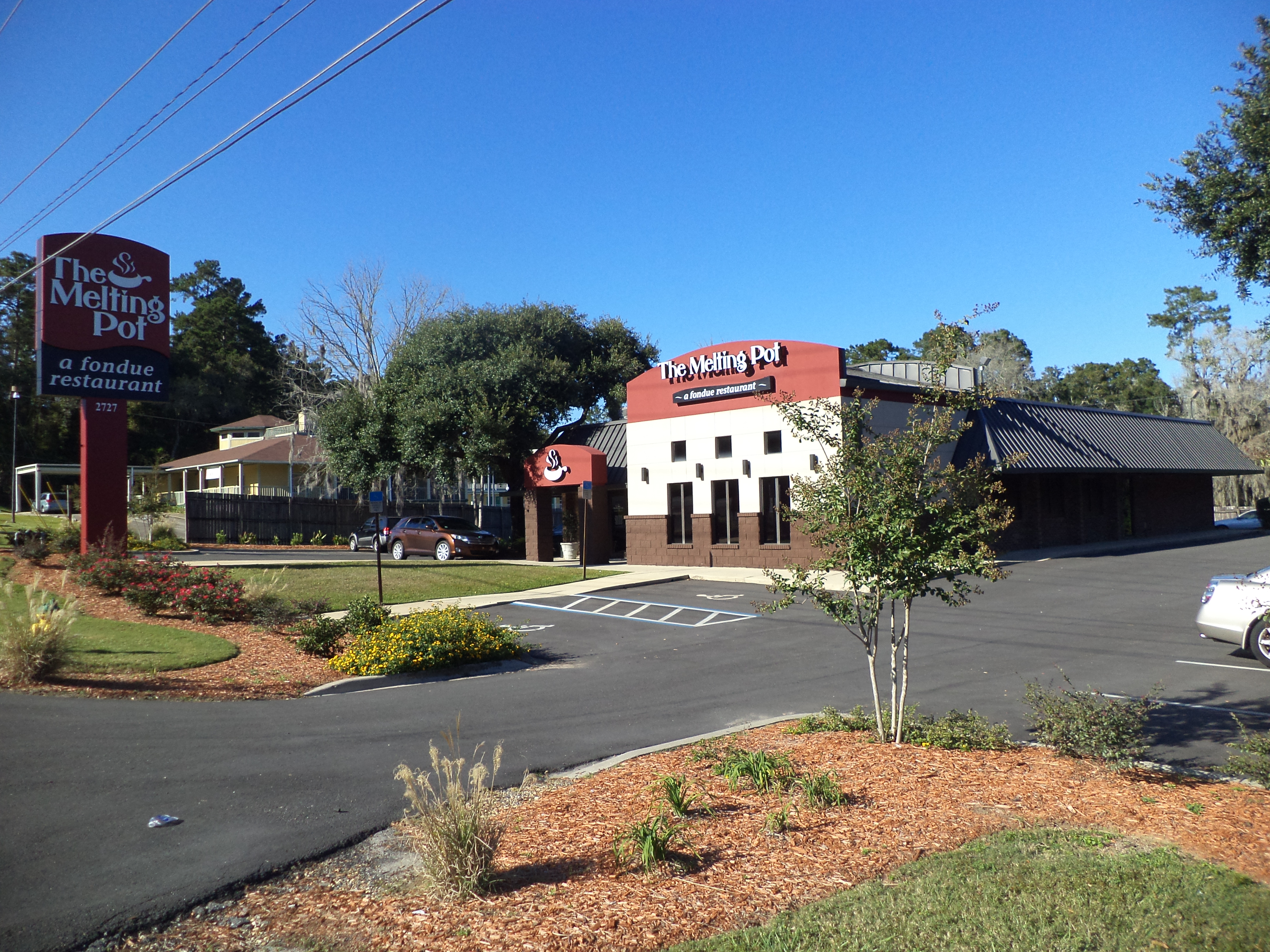
The Melting Pot restaurant in Tallahassee, Florida

== History ==
The first Melting Pot opened in April 1975 in Maitland, Florida – a suburban city of the Orlando Metropolitan Area – and it had only three items on its menu. With permission from the original owners, Mark and Mike Johnston opened The Melting Pot of Tallahassee, Florida in 1979. In 1984, the Johnston brothers purchased all rights to the Melting Pot brand and expanded the business into a franchise. As of May 2026, the chain currently has 95 locations in the United States, 15 of which are in Florida. As of May 2026, there is also one location in Canada, located in Edmonton.

In 2023, the company began selling food products online, in partnership with Omaha Steaks, and in some major grocery chains.

== Design ==
In April 2023, Melting Pot Restaurants had plans to remodel a store per week, to offer a more open dining room layout. This initiative was being called "Melting Pot Evolution" and was aimed at standardizing the restaurant's look, as the decor of some locations had not changed since the 1980's.

== Headquarters ==
The headquarters are located in Tampa, Florida.

== Management ==
The first CEO of The Melting Pot was Bob Johnston, the youngest brother of founders Mike and Mark. Bob had once worked as a dishwasher as early as age fourteen at his brothers' first location in Tallahassee. He served as the company's CEO until July 2025, when John “JC” Crawford, previously the EVP of Operations, was named the new CEO.
