= List of submarine sandwich restaurants =

The following is an incomplete list of notable submarine sandwich restaurants.

A submarine sandwich, also known as a sub, wedge, hoagie, hero, grinder, or one of many regional naming variations, is a sandwich that consists of a long roll of Italian or French bread, split widthwise either into two pieces, called "unhinged", or opened in a "V" on one side, called "hinged", and filled with a variety of meats, cheeses, vegetables, seasonings, and sauces. The sandwich has no standardized name, and many U.S. regions have their own names for it.

== Submarine sandwich restaurants ==
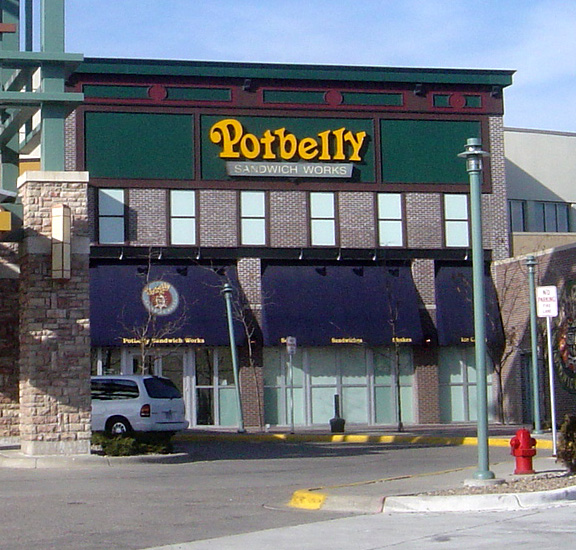
A Potbelly Sandwich Works location in Eden Prairie, Minnesota

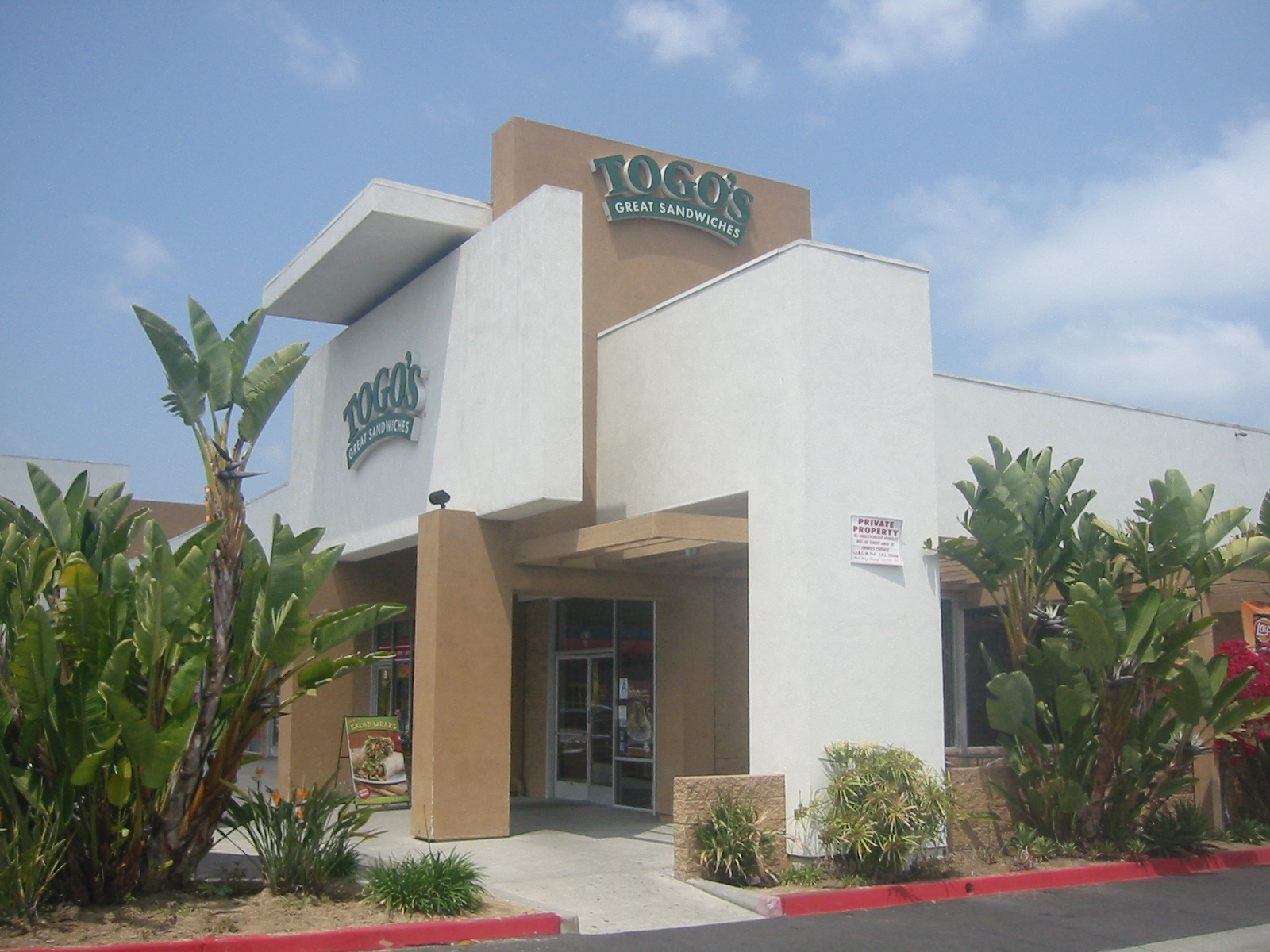
A Togo's restaurant in Los Angeles, California

- Amato's
- Big Bite Submarines
- Big John Steak & Onion
- Blimpie
- Campo's
- Capriotti's
- Charleys Philly Steaks
- Cheba Hut
- Cousins Subs
- Dalessandro's Steaks
- D'Angelo Sandwich Shops
- DiBella's
- Donkey's Place
- Earl of Sandwich (restaurant)
- Eegee's
- Erbert and Gerbert's
- Firehouse Subs
- Groucho's Deli
- Ike's Love & Sandwiches (restaurant)
- Jerry's Subs & Pizza
- Jimmy John's
- Jersey Mike's
- Larry's Giant Subs
- Lenny's Sub Shop
- Max's Steaks
- Milio's Sandwiches
- Moe's Italian Sandwiches
- Mr. Sub
- Penn Station
- Planet Sub
- Port of Subs
- Potbelly Sandwich Works
- Primo Hoagies
- Quiznos
- Schlotzsky's
- Submarina
- Subway
- Togo's
- Tubby's
- Wawa
- Which Wich?
- White House Sub Shop

== See also ==
- List of delicatessens
- List of restaurant chains
- Lists of restaurants
- List of sandwiches
  - List of American sandwiches
