= Max's =

Max's may refer to:

- Max's Restaurant, restaurant chain in the Philippines
- Max's Famous Hotdogs, restaurant in Long Branch, New Jersey
- Max's Kansas City, a former music venue in New York, New York
- Max's Steaks, a cheesesteak and hoagie restaurant in North Philadelphia, Pennsylvania
