= Primo Hoagies =

American sandwich franchise company

Primo Hoagies Franchising, Inc.
- Trade name: Primo Hoagies
- Type: Private
- Industry: Restaurants
- Genre: Fast Casual
- Founded: 1992; 34 years ago in South Philadelphia, Philadelphia, Pennsylvania, United States
- Founder: Richard Neigre
- Headquarters: Westville, New Jersey, United States
- Number of locations: 115
- Area served: United States
- Key people: Nicholas Papanier Jr (Owner, President, & CEO)
- Products: Hoagies
- Revenue: ▲US$3.6 million (2019)
- Number of employees: 300 (2020)
- Website: primohoagies.com

PrimoHoagies Franchising, Inc., doing business as PrimoHoagies, is a United States East Coast-based, fast casual restaurant chain founded in 1992 in South Philadelphia. Primo Hoagies has over 115 locations in ten states.

== History ==
Primo Hoagies was founded on Ritner Street in South Philadelphia in July 1992 by Richard and Colleen Neigre. In 2002, the restaurant was franchised with its corporate headquarters located in Westville, New Jersey.

The most popular sandwiches are the "Italian with prosciutto [and] provolone cheese, Hot Capicola and natural casing Genoa salami".

The franchise is known for its Philadelphia styled hoagies. Lindsey Nolen of South Philly Review stated "Primos is Primo when it comes to an Italian Hoagie".

== See also ==
- List of submarine sandwich restaurants
