= Port of Subs =

American sandwich chain

Port of Subs, Inc.

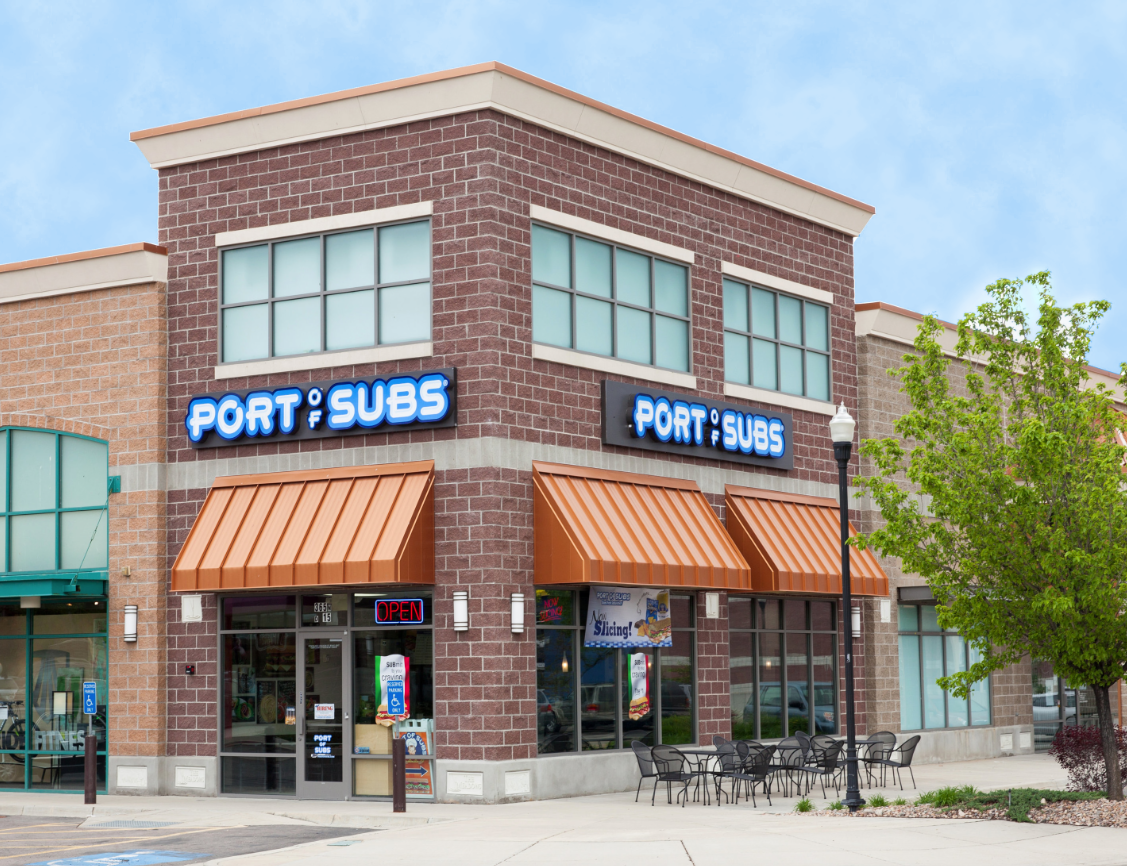
- A former Port of Subs restaurant in American Fork, Utah.
- Type: Private
- Industry: Restaurants
- Genre: Fast Casual
- Founded: 1972; 54 years ago in Reno, Nevada
- Founder: John Larsen
- Headquarters: Reno, Nevada, U.S.
- Number of locations: ▲145 (2020)
- Area served: Western United States
- Products: Subs; Wraps; Salads; Beverages
- Revenue: ▲$129 million (2018)
- Owner: Area 15 Ventures, LLC
- Website: portofsubs.com

Port of Subs, Inc., is an American regional submarine sandwich shop chain headquartered in Reno, Nevada; its franchise has about 145 locations open. The chain operates only in the western United States; its name came from a sponsored contest for a new name which received more than 10,000 entries.

== History ==
The Larsen family founded the chain under the name "Sub Shop" in 1972 in Sparks, Nevada. John Larsen purchased the company in 1975 and renamed it Port of Subs after holding a community-wide contest for its new name.

Between 1975 and 1985, ten more shops were established before Port of Subs became a regional franchise. The shop currently has more than 140 locations throughout the western United States. It can be found in Nevada, California, Colorado, Utah, Arizona, Idaho, Oregon, Washington, and Naval Station Guantanamo Bay.

Port of Subs was acquired by Area 15 Ventures, LLC in 2023, whose chairman is Dave Liniger, Co-Founder of RE/MAX.

== See also ==
- List of submarine sandwich restaurants
