= Erbert & Gerbert's =

Restaurant franchise in the United States

Erbert & Gerbert's Sandwich Shop
- Company type: Private
- Industry: Restaurants Franchising
- Founded: Eau Claire, Wisconsin (1987; 39 years ago)
- Headquarters: Eau Claire, Wisconsin, U.S.
- Key people: Eric Wolfe (CEO)
- Products: Sandwiches; Soups; Other food products
- Revenue: $22 million (2007)
- Website: erbertandgerberts.com

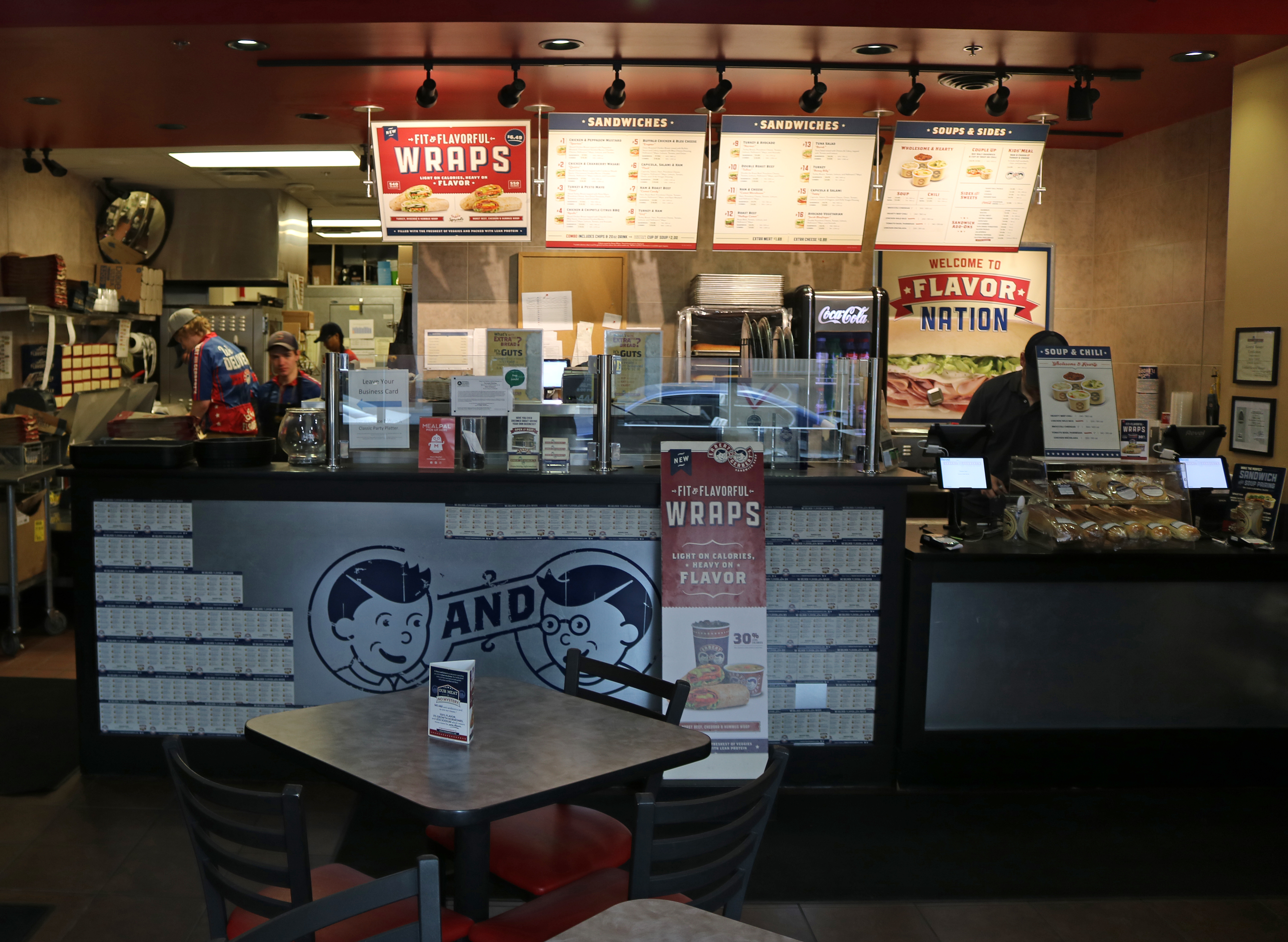
Interior of one of the shops.

Erbert & Gerbert's Sandwich Shop is a restaurant franchise specializing in submarine sandwiches. The chain was founded in Eau Claire, Wisconsin in 1987, with the first store opening in 1988. The company has more than 50 locations throughout Arizona, Colorado, Indiana, Iowa, Michigan, Minnesota, Montana, Nebraska, North Dakota, South Dakota, Ohio, Texas and Wisconsin, as well a single location in both North Carolina and Georgia. Its headquarters are in Eau Claire, Wisconsin. Their shops are often located near college areas.

== Overview ==
Erbert & Gerbert's Logo used until March 2010.

Kevin and Beth Schippers opened the first restaurant on Water Street in Eau Claire, Wisconsin in 1988. The store and sandwiches are named after characters in stories Schippers's father used to tell him In 2003, Schippers was awarded Wisconsin's 2003 Emerging Small Business Person from the Small Business Administration. Because of Kevin's desire to pursue a career in ministry, in 2003 Schippers sold the franchising company to investors led by primary owner Eric Wolfe. Kevin Schippers continues to own the original Eau Claire location.

Erbert & Gerbert's prepare their sandwiches by cutting the bread and taking out the soft white dough part and leaving the fillings on top of the sandwich.

In 2009, Erbert & Gerbert's was awarded a Gold Effie Award for their advertising campaign, designed by Colle+McVoy.

To celebrate the 20 year anniversary of Erbert & Gerbert's, a commercial was created allegedly using the world's largest Air Vortex Cannon.

== Products ==
Erbert and Gerbert's main menu items are submarine sandwiches, and there are 16 sandwiches on the menu. Sandwiches take names such as Halley's Comet and Comet Morehouse, as well as made up names such as Girf and Narmer. The Erbert and Gerbert's franchise also has gluten-free products.

== See also ==
- List of submarine sandwich restaurants
