= Moe's Italian Sandwiches =

American restaurant chain

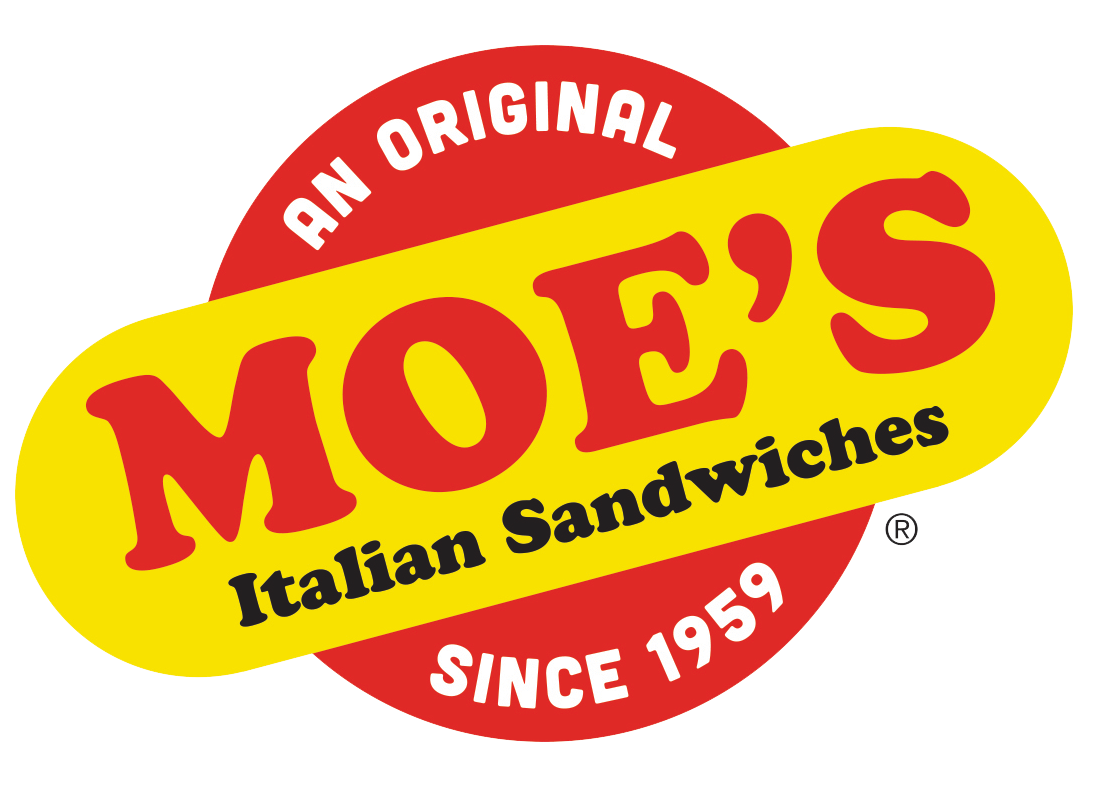
- Type: Private company
- Industry: Restaurants
- Founded: Portsmouth, New Hampshire (1959; 67 years ago)
- Headquarters: Portsmouth, New Hampshire
- Key people: Phil "Moe" Pagano, Founder
- Products: Sandwiches; Salads; Soups; Other food products
- Website: http://www.moesitaliansandwiches.com/

Moe's Italian Sandwiches is the name of an Italian submarine sandwich shop located in Portsmouth, New Hampshire. The owners, the Paganos, also own the Moe's franchising business, MadMoe Corporation, which has begun placing Moe's Italian Sandwiches restaurants throughout New England.

Phil "Moe" Pagano quit his job as a cheese salesman and opened his first shop on State St then in May 1959 when he bought a sandwich shop on Daniel Street in Portsmouth from Moe Winer. He surprised many by selling only one type of sandwich, the recipe having been handed down by his mother. It featured mild salami, provolone, thinly sliced onions and peppers, tomatoes, olives, with a small amount of olive oil on a submarine sandwich roll.

In 1993, Phil Pagano started selling franchises, offering others a chance to open their own Moe's. Today these franchises can be found throughout New England, though most locations are in southern New Hampshire.

The Portsmouth shop, on Daniel Street, is still run by the Pagano family and is located a few doors down from the original shop's location. They have since expanded their menu to include turkey, ham, tuna and several other choices.

Phil "Moe" Pagano died on May 16, 2006, at the age of 90.

== See also ==
- Italian sandwich
- List of submarine sandwich restaurants
