= Larry's Giant Subs =

American fast food chain

- Company type: Private company
- Industry: Restaurants
- Founded: Jacksonville, Florida (1982; 44 years ago)
- Headquarters: Jacksonville, Florida
- Products: Sandwiches; Salads; Other food products
- Website: Larryssubs.com

Larry's Giant Subs is a fast-food submarine sandwich chain headquartered in Jacksonville, Florida. Their first store opened in Jacksonville, Florida in 1982.

== History ==
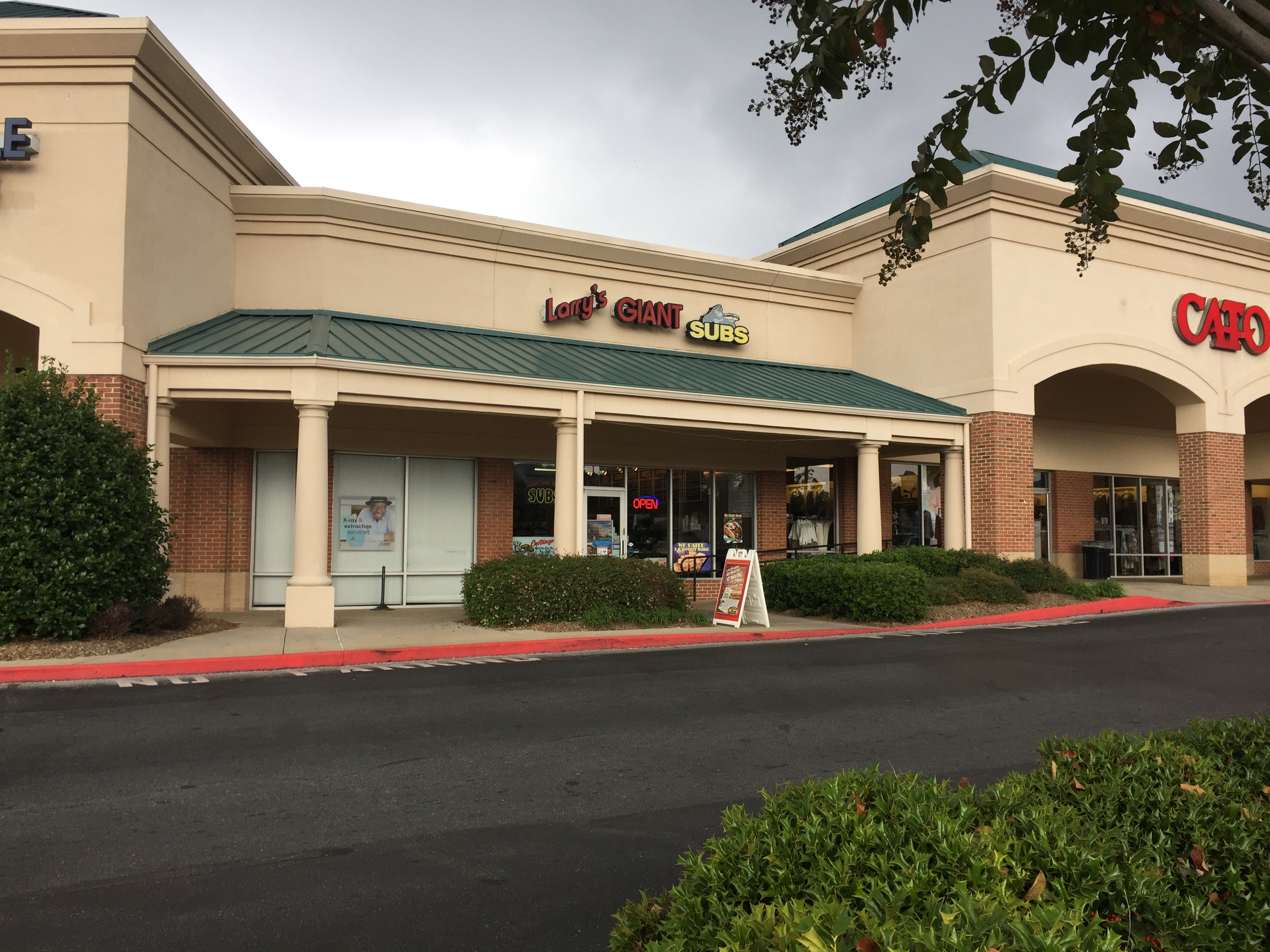
A Larry's Giant Subs in Cartersville, Georgia

Larry and Mitch Raikes built the first Larry's Giant Subs in Jacksonville, Florida in 1982. After seeing the response the first store received, the two brothers were inspired to branch out and take their concept nationwide.

== See also ==
- List of submarine sandwich restaurants
