= Tubby's =

American restaurant chain and franchise

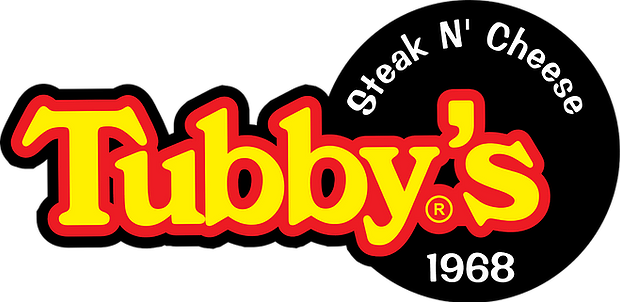
- Type: Private
- Industry: Fast food
- Founded: St. Clair Shores, Michigan (1968; 58 years ago)
- Founder: Richard Paganes
- Headquarters: Clinton Township, Michigan, United States
- Number of locations: 52 (2026)
- Area served: Michigan (primarily metropolitan Detroit)
- Key people: Robert Paganes (President & CEO), Bill Kiryakoza (Executive VP)
- Products: Submarine sandwiches, soup, salad, baked goods
- Website: tubbys.com

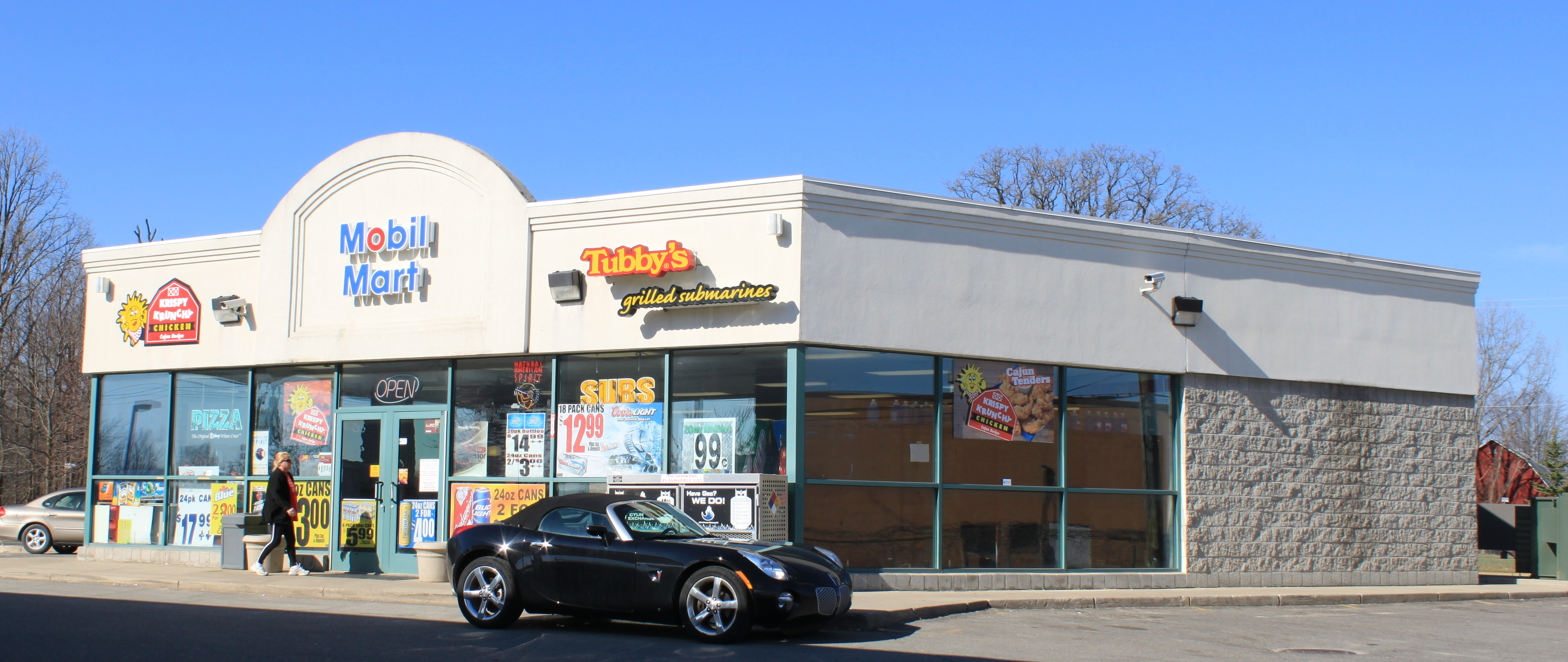
Tubby's store (now closed), South Lyon, Michigan

Tubby's is an American restaurant chain and franchise based in Clinton Township, Michigan, a suburb of Detroit, Michigan. Founded in 1968 in nearby St. Clair Shores, the chain operates 52 stores throughout Michigan, primarily in the Detroit metropolitan area. The chain primarily serves submarine sandwiches and salads, proprietary chips, soft drinks, french fries and soup, and is known for its grilled subs. In 2015, it acquired local cupcake brand Just Baked.

== History ==
Tubby's was founded in 1968 in St. Clair Shores, Michigan. Founder Richard Paganes, who was 21 at the time, had previously worked at another local sub shop called Super Sub Shop, and decided to open his own sub shop. The site of the first Tubby's was chosen after Paganes found himself stopped with a flat tire in front of a building that was for rent. By early 1968, the first Tubby's was opened. It sold twenty-five different varieties of sandwich, most grilled. He soon opened three more locations nearby, and eventually enlisted the help of his brother Robert. By 1977, the chain had grown to ten locations, and was incorporated as Tubby's Sub Shops, Inc. The first franchised location opened in Madison Heights, and several other locations began offering dine-in as well as carry-out; the Westland location was the first to feature a drive-through window.

By 1986, with fifty locations at the time, the company had gone public. Shortly afterward, the chain acquired a local restaurant called Ricky's Dairy Bar and Luxury Grill. This concept was franchised as well. Tubby's merged with New Jersey–based Stuff Yer Face, Inc., and was renamed as Tubby's, Inc. Paganes then became chairman and CEO of Tubby's, Inc., although he was replaced one year later by Alexander Bardy as CEO.

=== 1990s and 2000s ===
In 1994, Tubby's also started a concept called Tubby's Café Express, which operated inside five local Sears department stores, including the ones at Fairlane Town Center in Dearborn and Oakland Mall in Troy. They also proposed another prototype, drive-through-only location, and opened locations on the campuses of Wayne State University in Detroit and Ohio State University in Columbus, Ohio, as well as one located inside a Detroit hospital.

Later in 1994, however, Bardy was ousted and replaced with Paganes as CEO, and the Café Express concept was abandoned. Locations were also opened in Florida and Ohio, and the chain began opening locations inside gas stations as well. Their first location outside the United States opened in Edmonton, Alberta, Canada, in 1997, followed by outlets in Indiana and Missouri a year later.

After a failed merger with Florida-based Interfoods of America, Tubby's returned to private ownership in 1999. That same year, the chain expanded into Arizona as well. All of the locations outside Michigan were eventually closed, however, as the chain chose to focus more on the Detroit area, to compete with national chains such as Quiznos and Subway, of which only Subway remains. A prototype store, the 100th in the chain, opened in Macomb Township in 2001. This was also the first location in the chain to serve pizza. In the 2010s, Tubby's purchased the cupcake shop, Just Baked. As of 2019 Tubby’s has around 55 locations in the Metropolitan Detroit area.

=== 2010s and 2020s ===
In the 2010s, Tubby's undertook significant modernization and strategic repositioning under the continued leadership of Robert Paganes and new partner Bill Kiryakoza, who joined as Executive Vice President in 2010. In 2014, Kiryakoza and Paganes became co-owners after acquiring the remaining shares from the Paganes family. That same year, they announced plans to remodel stores, modernize branding, and expand product offerings.

In 2015, Tubby’s purchased the Just Baked brand, a Michigan-based cupcake bakery. They began offering Just Baked gourmet cupcakes in their stores as a co-branded concept, without additional cost to franchisees. This move helped diversify Tubby’s menu and attract a broader customer base.

During the COVID-19 pandemic, Tubby’s leveraged its drive-thru and mobile ordering infrastructure to remain operational and serve customers safely. Sales reportedly grew by nearly 11% from 2020 to 2021.

In 2022, the company announced plans to expand beyond Metro Detroit into other key Michigan markets, including Ann Arbor, Lansing, Flint, Grand Rapids, and Kalamazoo. As of 2023, Tubby’s operated over 60 locations across the state, continuing to emphasize its unique pairing of grilled submarine sandwiches and gourmet cupcakes.

== See also ==
- List of submarine sandwich restaurants
