= Cousins Subs =

American restaurant chain

Cousins Submarines, Inc.
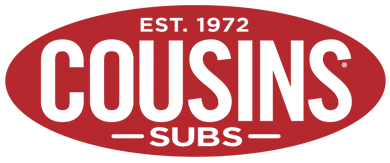
- Trade name: Cousins Subs
- Type: Private
- Industry: Sandwich shop Franchising
- Genre: Fast casual
- Founded: 1972; 54 years ago in Milwaukee, Wisconsin
- Founders: Bill Specht; James Sheppard
- Headquarters: Menomonee Falls, Wisconsin
- Number of locations: 100+ as of October 2019
- Area served: Wisconsin; Indiana
- Key people: Christine Specht-Palmert; CEO; Jason Westhoff; President
- Products: Sandwiches; Salads; Other food products
- Website: cousinssubs.com

Cousins Submarines, better known as Cousins Subs, is an American sub sandwich shop with nearly 100 locations as of December 2024. It was founded in 1972 by cousins Bill Specht and Jim Sheppard and is a regional chain with restaurants in Wisconsin and Indiana.

== History ==
Cousins Subs was founded in Milwaukee, Wisconsin in 1972 by cousins Bill Specht and James Sheppard, who could not find a suitable sub sandwich option in Milwaukee like they had when they lived in New Jersey.

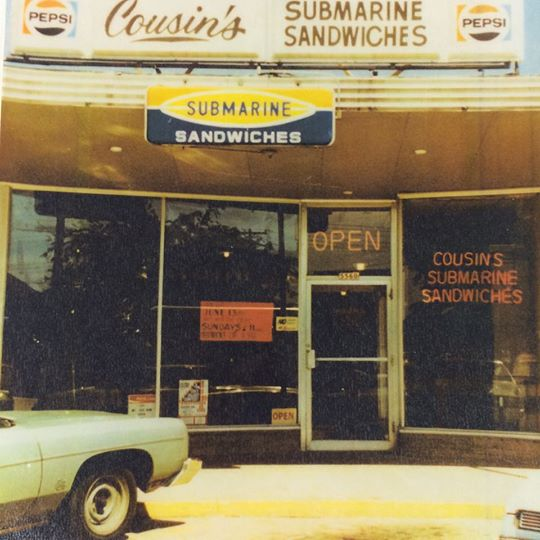
The first Cousins Subs location in Milwaukee, Wisconsin - 60th & Silver Spring Drive.

Specht and Sheppard opened their first restaurant in Milwaukee, which was located at 60th Street and Silver Spring Drive. After opening the shop, they partnered with a local baker to make their own bread, highlighted in the slogan "Better Bread, Better Subs". A large segment of customers during Cousins' early years were former East Coast residents.

In 2009, Cousins Subs announced it would put an increased focus on the local side of the business. During the Great Recession, Cousins Subs closed over 40 locations to better focus on quality.

In 2013, Cousins Subs established The Make It Better Foundation, which focuses in improving the welfare and quality of life in the communities, particularly in health and wellness, hunger, and youth education.

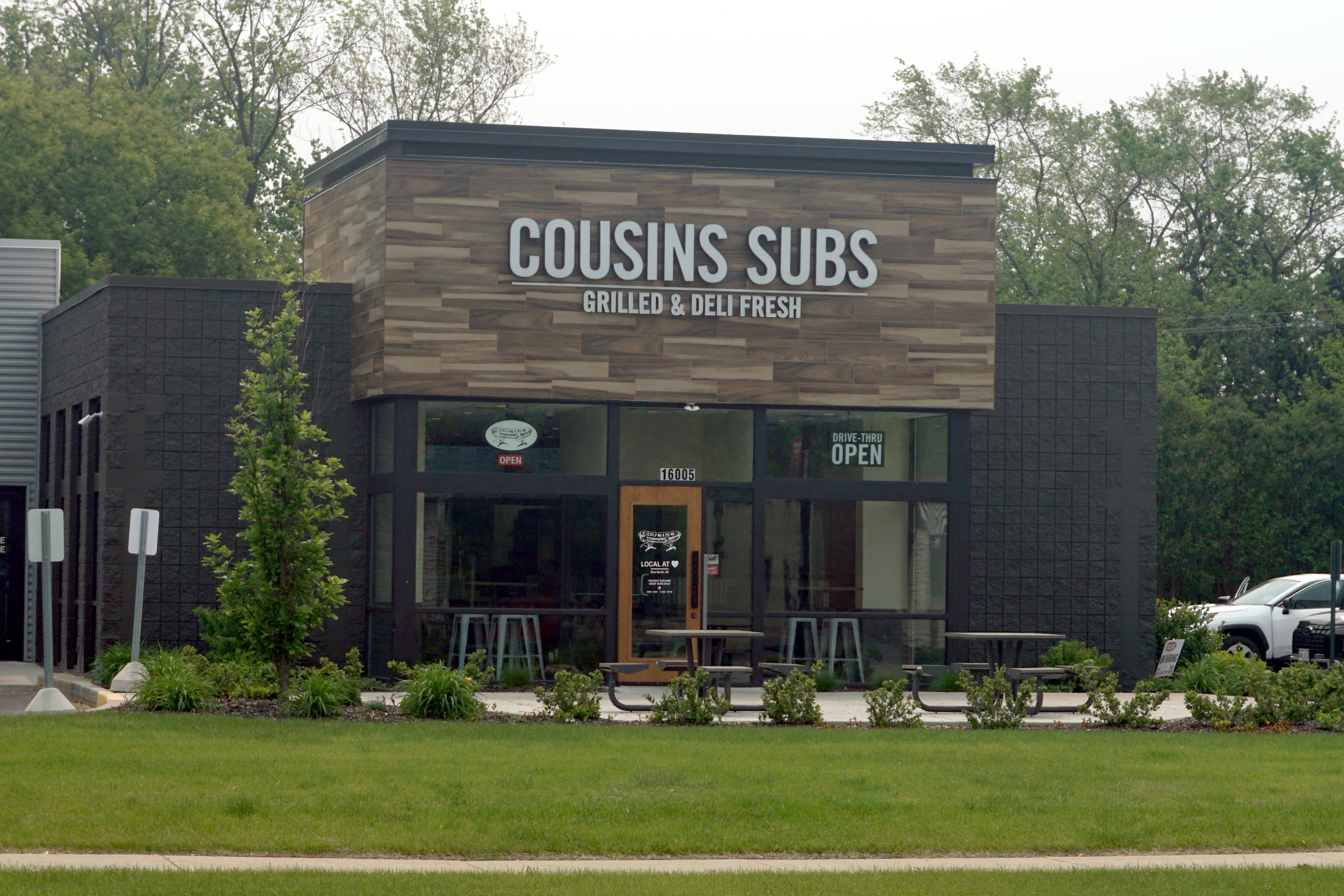
Cousins Subs in New Berlin, Wisconsin

Christine Specht-Palmert, daughter of co-founder Bill Specht, took over as CEO in 2015 when her father retired.

Cousins Subs announced another rebranding in 2016, which included expanding its footprint throughout the Midwest; remodeling all locations to its Milwaukee Sub Shop to unify the brand; in look and feel, updating its exterior design, logo, packaging and uniform designs; and digitally enhancing the in-store experience for its guests. Along with the remodel, Cousins Subs struck sponsorship agreements with the Milwaukee Bucks, Wisconsin Timber Rattlers, Green Bay Packers and Wisconsin Badgers.

As of October 2019, there were approximately 100+ Cousins Subs locations throughout Wisconsin, Illinois, and Indiana. Cousins Subs continues to develop new locations throughout the Midwest with franchise partners focused on multi-unit development.

In August 2018, Cousins announced their expansion into the Chicago market with 40 new locations opening by 2025. As of July 2021, there were six locations in the Chicago area. All locations in the Chicago area have since closed.

Also in 2018, Cousins announced it would re-enter the Twin Cities market of Minnesota, after shuttering stores in 2015. The initial plan is to open about six stores per year, but as of August 2021, none have come to fruition.

== See also ==
- List of submarine sandwich restaurants
