= Eegee's =

American restaurant chain

eegee's
- Type: Privately held company
- Industry: Restaurants
- Genre: Quick service restaurant
- Founded: Tucson, Arizona, U.S. (1971; 55 years ago)
- Founder: Ed Irving and Bob Greenberg
- Headquarters: Tucson, Arizona, U.S.
- Number of locations: 28 restaurants in Arizona
- Products: Subs; Salads; French Fries; Slush; Other food products
- Owner: 39 North Capital
- Website: eegees.com

Eegee's (stylized eegee's) is a chain of 28 restaurants in the Tucson and Phoenix, Arizona metro areas, as well as Casa Grande. Specializing in submarine sandwiches and its frozen fruit drink called the "eegee", the restaurant chain is also known for its signature ranch dressing, which comes in several flavor variations. Chicken tenders were added to the menu in 2022. It was founded in 1971 by Edmund Irving and Robert Greenberg, who combined their initials ("E" from Edmund and "G" from Greenberg) to create the name "eegee's". The company is known for its social and environmental involvement and financial contributions to initiatives, as well as the collection of donations for local charitable organizations; instituting the community recycling program "Green for Green!"; and its program for training and employing the mentally disabled.

== History ==
eegee's original logo used from the 1970s to 2011.

In 1971, Edmund Irving and Robert Greenberg pooled their resources and bought a used vending truck. In the beginning, Ed or Bob served their lemon eegee's frozen drink in front of high schools, at sporting events, and at concerts. Over the years, the vending trucks were retired as they turned their business into a growing restaurant chain in Southern Arizona. Currently, there are 21 locations in Tucson, four in Phoenix, as well as one location in Green Valley and Casa Grande, respectively.

On December 6, 2024, Eegee's filed for Chapter 11 bankruptcy protection, blaming the COVID-19 pandemic.

== Flavor of the Month ==
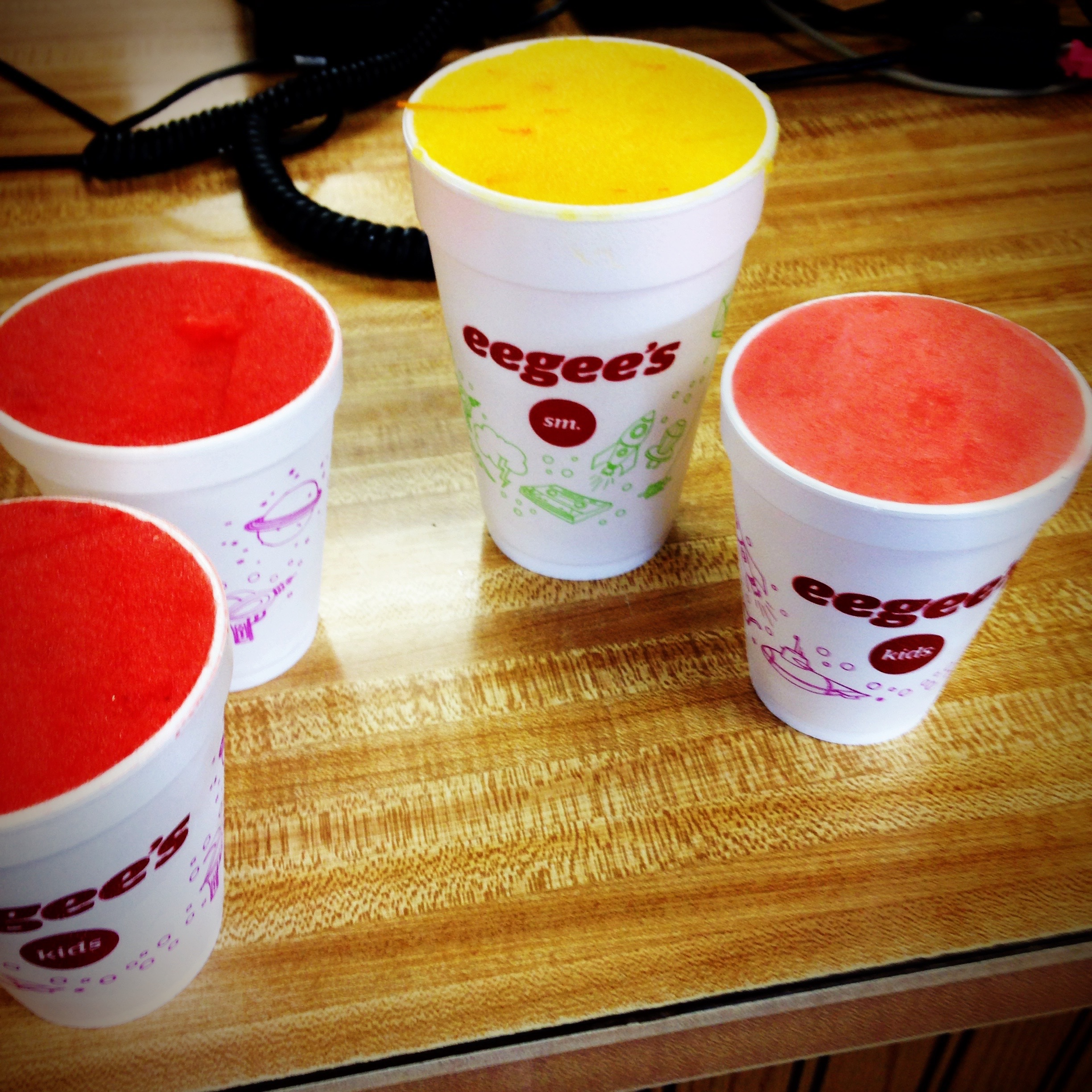
Eeege's flavors pictured in 2015

Lemon, Strawberry, Pina Colada, Mango, and Skinny Berry eegees are available all year but there is also a featured Flavor of the Month that changes each month of the year. There have also been special limited release flavors in addition to that month's flavor. These flavors include:

- Watermelon
- Peach 'n' Berry
- Cherry Limeade
- Orange Dream
- Raspberry Lemonade
- Pineapple Dream
- Lucky Lime
- Mango Tango
- Jungle Juice
- Cherry Cider
- Holly Berry
- Black Raspberry/Scary Berry
- Blueberry Lemon
- Red Licorice
- Kiwi
- Prickly Pear
- Rootin' Tootin' Root Beer/Rodeo Root Beer
- Pineapple Watermelon Splash
- Banana Blush
- Pomegranate Blast
- Cherry Pineapple
- Galactic Grape
- Paradise Punch
- Snake Bite
- Icicle
