= DiBella's =

American sandwich shop chain

DiBella's Subs
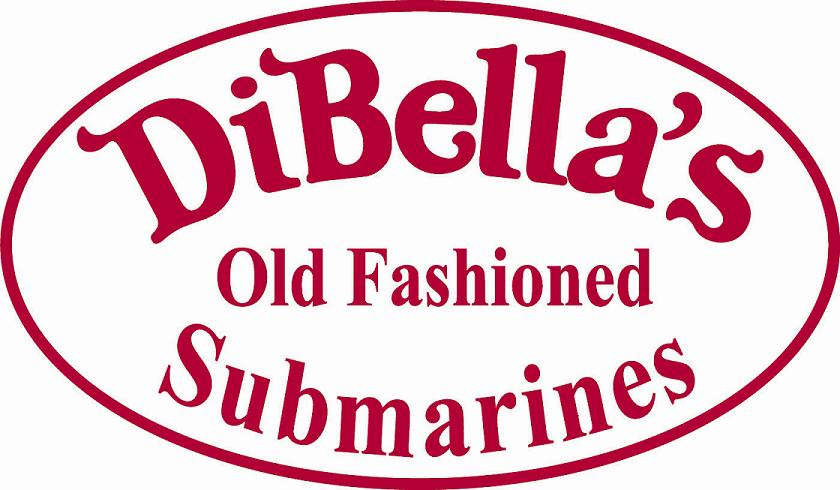
- Company type: Private
- Industry: Food service
- Founded: Rochester, New York, United States 1918; 108 years ago
- Headquarters: Rochester, New York, United States
- Number of locations: 44 locations
- Area served: New York, Pennsylvania, Ohio, Michigan, Connecticut
- Products: Sandwiches
- Website: dibellas.com

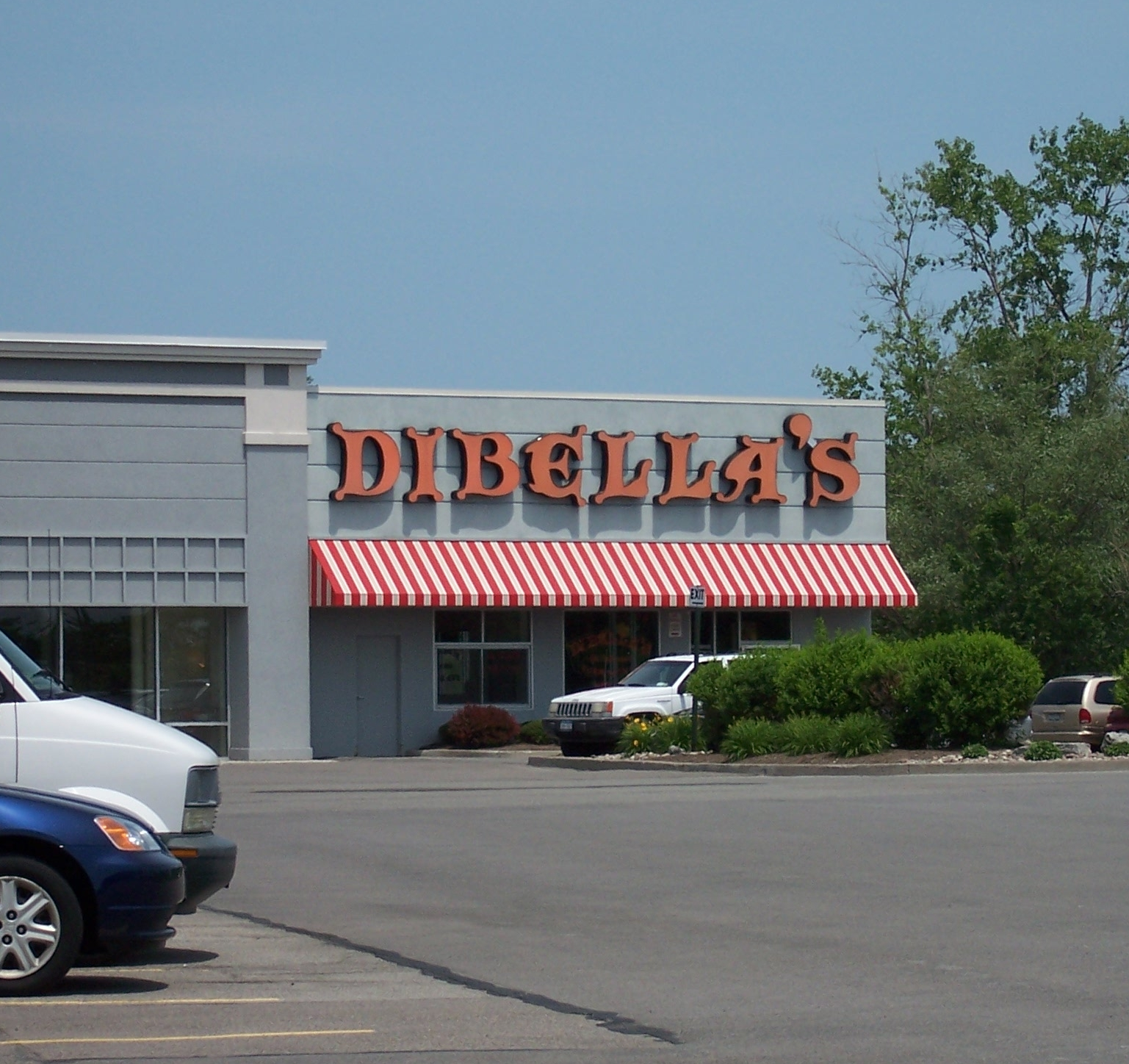
A typical DiBella's storefront, although this one has since moved to a new location.

Dibella's Old Fashioned Submarines is a sub sandwich restaurant chain based in Rochester, New York, United States. They have 44 locations across New York, Pennsylvania, Ohio, Connecticut, and Michigan as of 2021.

DiBella's was founded in 1918. It first began as a family-run Italian import store and delicatessen in the city of Rochester. Over the years, their prepared foods became more popular at the expense of their grocery items. Until 1998, the company's operations consisted of a single sub shop in the Rochester suburb of Henrietta (pictured); that same year, a second store was added in the nearby suburb of Greece.

From there, DiBella's opened additional locations around the Rochester area, then expanded into nearby Buffalo. In the late 2000s, they started expanding out-of-state, first to the Pittsburgh area, then to parts of Ohio and eastern Michigan. They have also opened locations more recently in Albany and Syracuse, and in 2012 the company moved into New England, specifically Connecticut and the Hartford / New Haven area. They attempted to operate stores in Indianapolis, but all three locations have since closed.

DiBella's stores' decor are based on a 1930s/1940s delicatessen theme. They bake bread at least twice daily. High-end grocery chain Wegmans consulted with Dibella's when establishing their own sandwich counter, and their sandwiches are noted for their similarity.
