= Ike's Love & Sandwiches (restaurant) =

Sandwich restaurant franchise

- Industry: Sandwiches
- Founded: 2007; 19 years ago in San Francisco, California
- Key people: Michael Goldberg (CEO)
- Owner: Ike Shehadeh
- Website: https://www.ikessandwich.com/

Ike's Love & Sandwiches also commonly referred to as Ike's is a U.S. based sandwich restaurant franchise that offers meat, vegan, vegetarian, and gluten free options.

== History ==
The restaurant was founded in 2007 in San Francisco in the Castro district by Ike Shehadeh. The store was originally called "Ike's Place." Ike Shehadeh is of Palestinian descent and stated that he learned how to make sandwiches from his mother. Ike stated that his inspiration for creating the company was "to share my love of bringing people together over amazing food.” By 2024, the restaurant had over 100 locations, primarily in California, but additionally in Nevada, Colorado, Arizona, Utah, Hawaii, Texas, Louisiana, and other states. Its current CEO is Michael Goldberg.

The restaurant offers a wide variety of options including meat, vegan, vegetarian, and gluten free options. It also frequently does celebrity collaboration sandwiches, having over 100 collaborations in 2025. The sandwiches are also known for having unconventional names such as the "Sometimes I am a vegetarian" or the "'Hella' Fat Bastard".

== See also ==
- List of restaurant chains
- List of submarine sandwich restaurants
