= Jerry's Subs & Pizza =

American fast casual restaurant chain

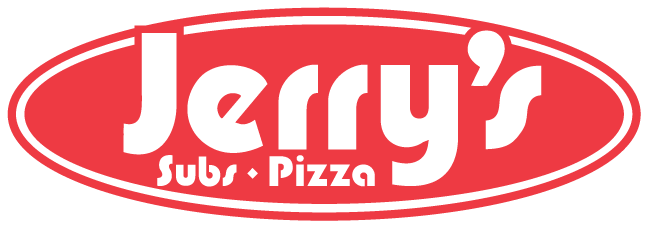
- Company type: Private
- Founded: March 18, 1954; 72 years ago Wheaton, Maryland, U.S.
- Headquarters: Gaithersburg, Maryland, U.S.
- Number of locations: 3
- Products: Pizza, cheesesteaks, cold subs, grilled subs, wings
- Website: jerrysusa.com/

Jerry's Subs & Pizza is an American fast casual sandwich and pizza restaurant chain based in Maryland; it has 3 open locations as of July 2024.

== History ==
Jerry's was founded in 1954 outside Washington, D.C., and was incorporated to its current position in Wheaton, Maryland, in 1954. Jerry's is headquartered in Gaithersburg, Maryland.

Jerry's opened its first sports bar concept in Hagerstown, Maryland, in April 2017, but the location closed on July 3, 2019.

== Recognition ==
Jerry's was listed as Maryland's most noteworthy restaurant chain by Thrillist in 2013. The chain was listed in the Top 100 Pizza Companies by Pizza Today Magazine from 2015 to 2018 and was awarded Largest Locally Owned Restaurant Chain and Top Restaurant Chain in 2013–2015 by the Washington Business Journal.

== See also ==
- List of pizza chains of the United States
