= Lennys Grill & Subs =

American fast food sandwich shop chain

Lennys Grill & Subs®
- Formerly: Lenny's Sub Shop®
- Company type: Private
- Industry: Restaurants
- Founded: Memphis, Tennessee (1998; 28 years ago)
- Headquarters: Memphis, Tennessee
- Products: Cheesesteaks, sub sandwiches, salads
- Owner: Lenny's Holdings, LLC
- Website: lennys.com

Lennys Sub Shop logo

Lennys Grill & Subs®, formerly Lenny's Sub Shop®, is a quick serve sandwich franchise of Philadelphia-style sub shops focused on cheesesteaks and sub sandwiches. Lennys is based in Memphis, Tennessee, and has about 100 locations, mainly throughout the southeastern United States.

Len and Shelia Moore opened the first Lenny's Sub Shop on September 16, 1998, in Bartlett, Tennessee. Within a year, they had expanded to five locations. Franchising began in 2001.
