= Campo's =

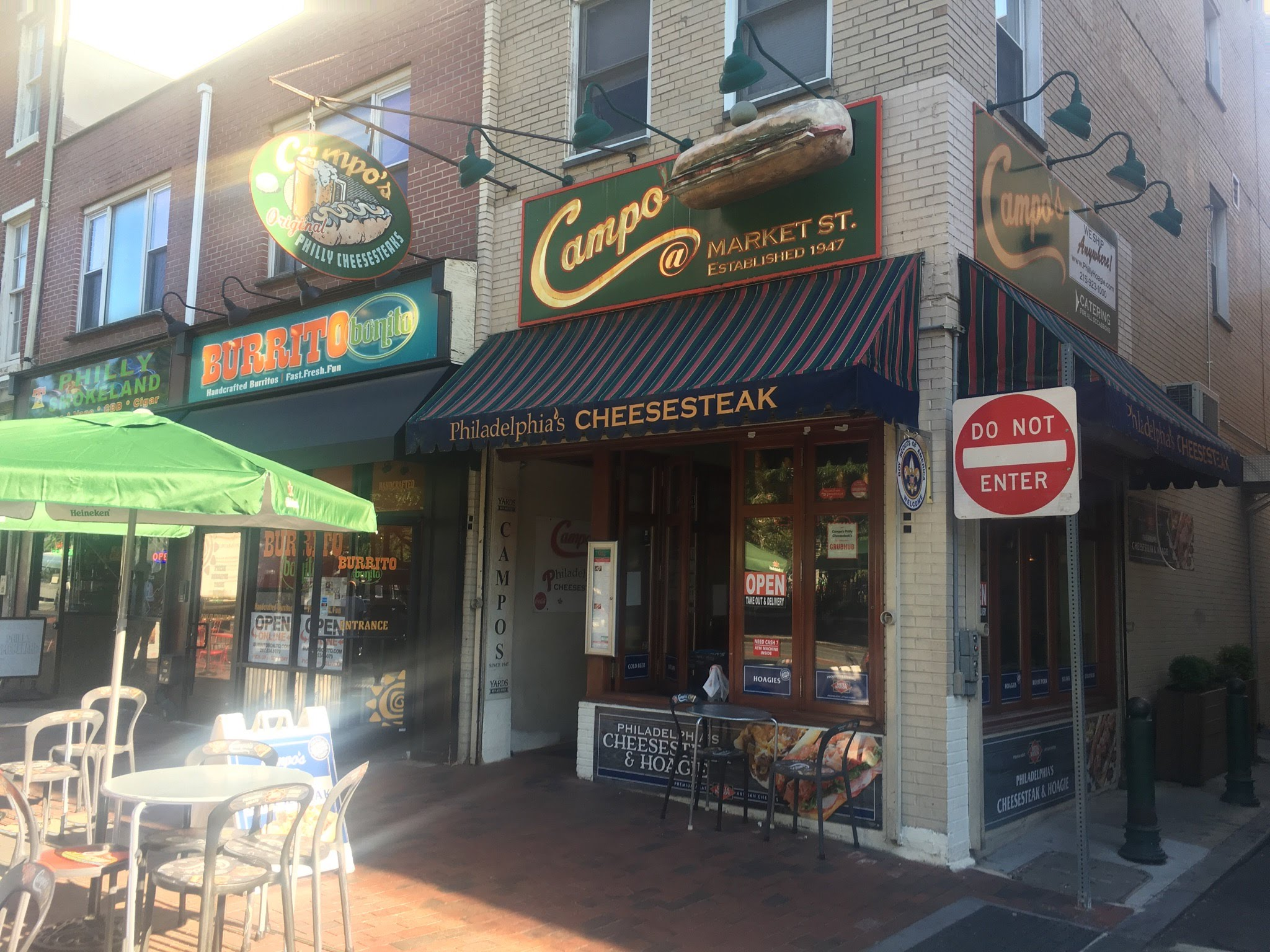
- Entrance to Campo's

Restaurant information
- Established: 1947; 79 years ago
- Owner: Michael Campo
- Food type: Cheesesteaks and other sandwiches
- Dress code: Casual
- Location: 214 Market Street, Philadelphia, Pennsylvania, U.S., Philadelphia, Pennsylvania, 19106, United States
- Other locations: Citizens Bank Park
- Website: camposdeli.com

Campo's Deli, also known as Campo's Philly Cheesesteaks, is a family-owned Italian deli in Philadelphia. Founded in 1947, the flagship location is situated on Market Street in the historic Old City neighborhood. The business has remained in the Campo family for three generations and is currently operated by Michael & Mia Campo.

Well known for its cheesesteaks, hoagies, and italian roast pork, Campo’s has expanded beyond its original storefront. Campo's operates food-service concessions in major Philadelphia sports venues, including Citizens Bank Park and formerly the Wells Fargo Center.

Campo’s has been recognized nationally as one of Philadelphia's top cheesesteak destinations.

== History ==
Campo's was established in 1947 by Ambrose and Rose Campo, as a neighborhood grocery store and butcher shop. Ambrose had previously served in the U.S. military during WWII. By the 1990s, Campo’s was among the early Philadelphia delis to ship cheesesteaks and other fresh products nationwide direct to consumers. In 2012, the business sought to trademark the phrase “Philadelphia’s Cheesesteak,” which it had used for more than a decade.

In 2014, GQ writer Alan Richman noted that Campo’s was sometimes called “the reigning cheesesteak champion.” The deli has also attracted celebrity visitors, including actor Danny DeVito during filming for It’s Always Sunny in Philadelphia and boxers Oscar De La Hoya and Bernard Hopkins. Campo’s also served as the official cheesesteak of the Philadelphia Flyers for a period of time.

Today, the shop is owned and operated by third-generation family members, siblings Michael & Mia Campo.

== Menu ==
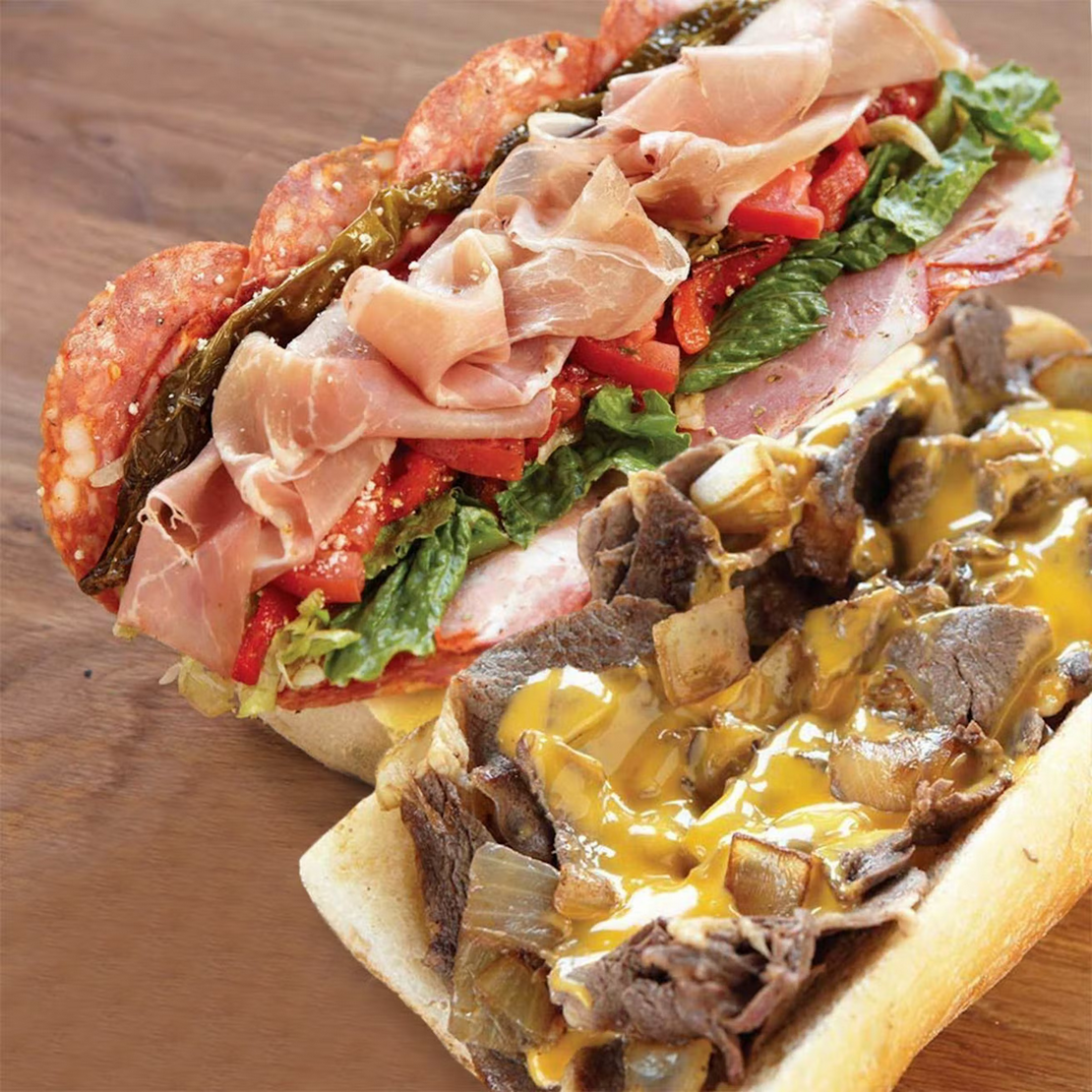
Campo's cheesesteak and Italian hoagie

Campo’s is best known for its cheesesteaks, but they make old school hoagies, roast Italian pork, homemade soups, salads, broccoli rabe, long hots, and meatballs prepared using the original 1947 family recipe.

The official cheesesteak of the Philadelphia Phillies and served at games at Citizens Bank Park, the “Heater” is a cheesesteak featuring hot peppers, hot sauce, and hot pepper cheese.

Campo’s is also known for its vegan, vegetarian, and gluten free versions of the classic cheesesteak.

== See also ==
- List of submarine sandwich restaurants
