= Big John Steak & Onion =

Company

Big John Steak & Onion, Inc.
- Company type: Private
- Industry: Fast Food Restaurants
- Founded: 1963/1973
- Founder: John E. Klobucar
- Headquarters: Mt. Morris Township, MI, USA
- Number of locations: 16
- Area served: Mid Michigan
- Key people: John D. Klobucar
- Products: submarine sandwiches
- Number of employees: 75
- Website: www.bigjohnsteakandonion.net

Big John Steak & Onion, aka BJs & Onion or Steak and Onion and formerly Slick-Chick, Inc., is a regional sub sandwich chain. The name came from a nickname that the founder, John E. Klobucar, had received from his friends. The chain is considered a restaurant icon of the Flint Area.

== History ==
John E. Klobucar opened Flint, Michigan's first Kentucky Fried Chicken in 1963, the first outside of the Detroit area. He incorporated his business on August 16, 1967, as Slick-Chick, Inc. A decade later in 1973, Klobucar started Big John Steak and Onion, the first restaurant to serve submarine sandwiches in the Flint Area. The first location was opened on Dort Highway, near Court Street, and is still operating there. The original menu was the Steak and Onion plus 2 other subs and a Koegel hot dog. His brother Joseph "Joe" Klobucher opened Big John Chicken & Sandwich Factory franchise where he lived in Caro in 1973. On September 16, 1975, Slick-Chick changed its name to Big John Steak & Onion, Inc. Klobucar later opened a KFC in Owosso, but sold the Flint location.

The restaurant grew into a chain of 15 stores across Mid-Michigan by May 2011, when Klobucar died. Then Joe Klobucar took over as Chairman/President/CEO.

== Menu ==
- Steak and Onion Sandwich, with banana peppers, for which it is best known.
- Red Sauce, a cocktail sauce with a sweet/hot taste, its recipe is credited to John Kish, owner of Uncle Bob's Diner, a well known former Downtown Flint restaurant.
