= TOGO'S =

American fast food chain

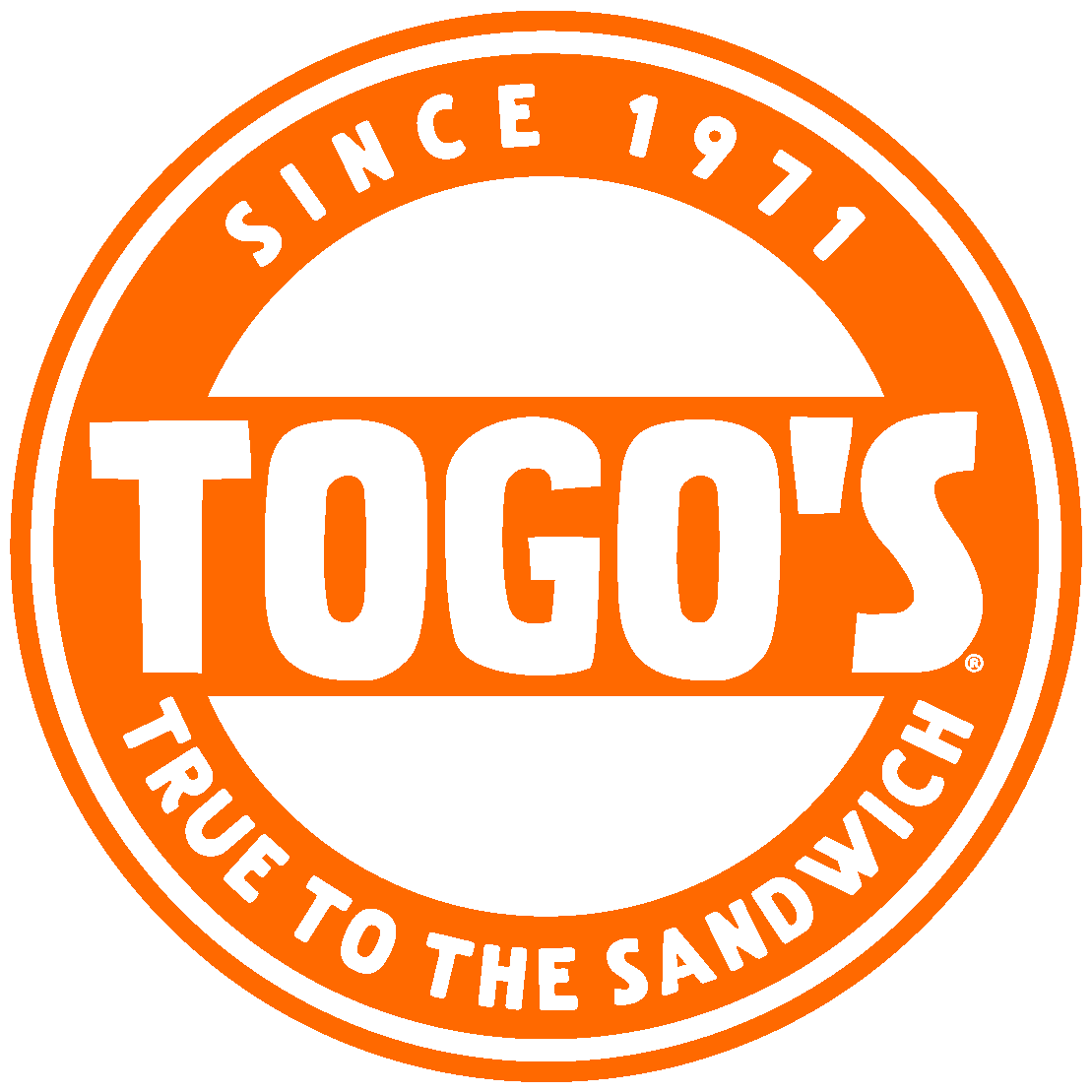

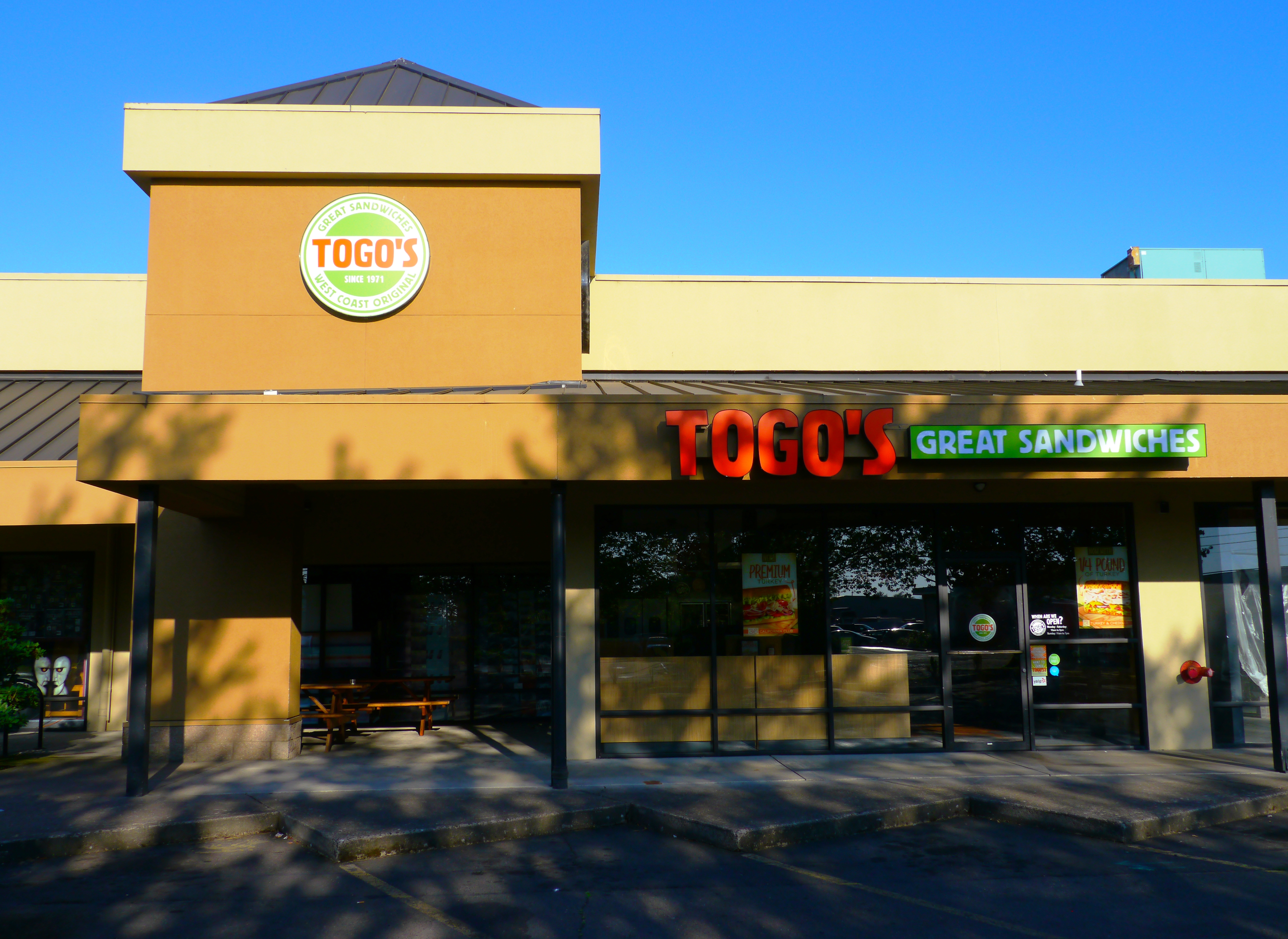
- TOGO'S in Eugene, Oregon
- Company type: Private
- Industry: Restaurants
- Founded: 1964; 62 years ago Marquette, Michigan
- Headquarters: San Jose, California, United States
- Key people: Glenn Lunde (CEO)
- Products: Sandwiches, salads, wraps
- Parent: Southfield Mezzanine Capital
- Website: www.togos.com

TOGO'S Eateries, LLC is an American chain of fast casual sandwich restaurants owned by Southfield Mezzanine Capital who purchased the company in March 2019. TOGO'S is headquartered in Campbell, California.

TOGO'S is a franchise-based business. Some TOGO'S locations are co-branded with Baskin-Robbins' ice cream shops (which were both owned by the same parent company from 1997 to 2007). As of November 2025, the company has over 145 locations open throughout the West (down from 180 in 2020.)

== History ==
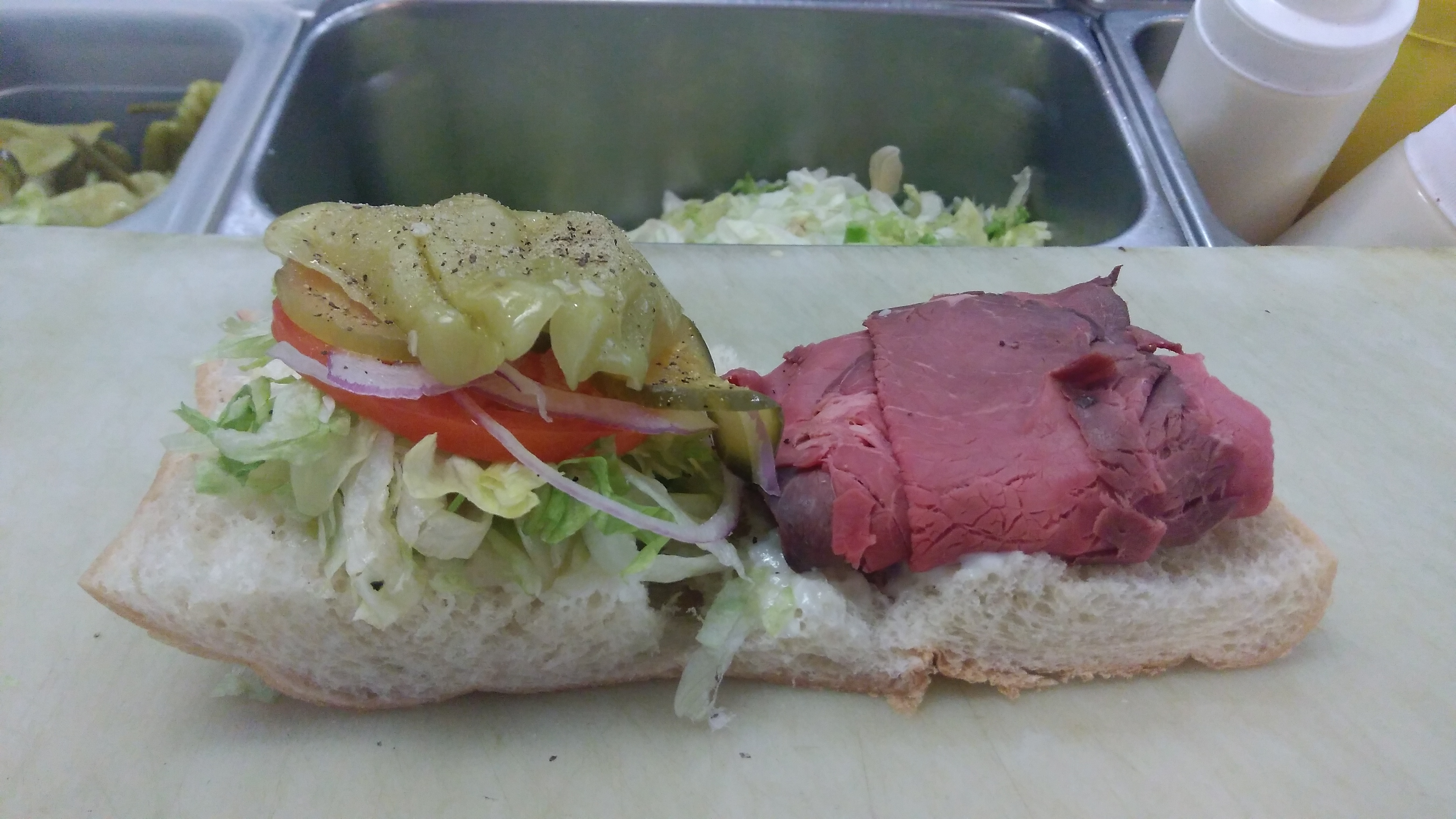
A #7 roast beef sandwich made Togo's Style

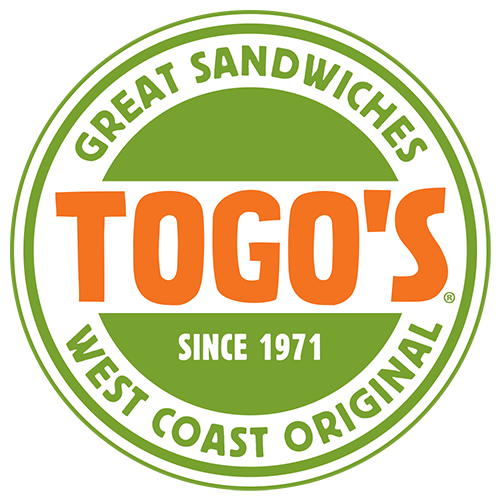
Logo until 2018

In 1964, two students of Northern Michigan University, Tom Neumann and Gordon Reed, opened the first TOGO'S in Marquette, Michigan. The origin of the name is twofold. The two co-founders combined parts of their first names, the "TO" from Tom and "GO" from Gordon. Additionally, the original shop had no seating, so all of the orders were "to-go". Neumann departed a year after the founding, and in 1966 Reed sold the business to Joseph Fountain. Fountain moved the Marquette business twice, settling in its current location at 1000 North Third Street. A second location in nearby Harvey was opened in the mid-1990s, but closed in April 2019.

Reed moved to San Jose, California and in 1968 again opened a shop named TOGO'S, this time at 336 East William Street near San Jose State University. At that time, the sandwich shack (in a building built in 1919 and less than 1,000 square feet or 93 square metres) was so small that only four people at a time could be inside and the sign out front read "Sandwiches To Go", with "To Go" being on the second line.

In 1971, the shop was purchased by Mike Cobler, a local San Jose State University student. The second TOGO'S location was opened in Corvallis, Oregon, in 1971 when Reed relocated after the sale of the San Jose location. The third location opened in downtown San Jose in 1974. The first franchise was sold in 1978.

In 1997, TOGO'S was acquired by Allied Domecq Quick Service Restaurants, a precursor of Dunkin' Brands. By 2001, there were approximately 350 TOGO'S sandwich shops, serving more than 25 different types of sandwiches.

On November 30, 2007, TOGO'S was sold to Mainsail Partners, a San Francisco-based private equity firm, in partnership with Tony Gioia, a former president of Baskin-Robbins. Gioia served as chairman and chief executive officer of TOGO'S until his retirement in May 2017. Mainsail sold the company to David Nazarian's Nîmes Capital in December 2015.

In 2018, its stores switched soft drinks from Pepsi to Coca-Cola Freestyle.

== Sandwiches ==
Most sandwiches on the TOGO'S menu are served with lettuce, tomatoes, onions, pickles and pepperoncinis, often called "TOGO'S Style". Depending on the menu item, TOGO'S Style can also come with salt and black pepper.

== See also ==
- List of submarine sandwich restaurants
