= Planet Sub =

Fast food restaurant known for scratch-made bread

- Company type: Private
- Industry: Quick Service Restaurants
- Founded: Lawrence, Kansas (1979; 47 years ago)
- Headquarters: Kansas City, Missouri
- Area served: Midwest
- Key people: Jeff Klusman (Founder), Sean Kelly (Founder), Kelly Klusman (Owner), Tyler Cordel (Dir. Marketing) Ryan Joy (Dir. Franchising)
- Products: Submarine Sandwich, Salads, Soups, Catering and assorted drinks
- Owner: Kelly Klusman
- Number of employees: 400+
- Website: www.planetsub.com

Planet Sub (or Yello Sub) is a growing fast food restaurant based in Kansas City, Missouri. They are expanding with emphasis on franchising the brand in the United States. As of 2016, they have 14 corporate stores and 28 franchise locations, with 26 additional franchise units in development. Open markets include: Kansas City, Topeka, Wichita, Lawrence, Warrensburg, Des Moines, St. Louis, Phoenix, Tucson, Austin, Oklahoma City, Owasso (Tulsa), Dallas, San Antonio, Omaha, and Emporia.

Planet Sub is known for their bread made from scratch in each of their locations and their playing card system in which customers are given a unique playing card to identify their sandwich when it is finished being baked. Most products are made from scratch in each location and all meats and cheeses are sliced daily. They also serve made-to-order salads, romaine lettuce wraps, soups, and cookies.

== History ==
The original Yello Sub sandwich store (from which Planet Sub was born) was opened in Lawrence, Kansas in 1979. The Planet Sub franchise opened its first store in Overland Park, Kansas in 1998. The company has held true to several elements of their roots including fresh sliced meats, veggies, and cheeses, home-made sauces and bread, and have expanded their menu to over 45 unique sandwich choices.
