= Submarina =

American chain of fast-food restaurants

Submarina California Subs
- Submarina Logo
- Company type: Private
- Industry: Quick Service Restaurants
- Genre: Fast food
- Founded: 1977; 49 years ago
- Founder: Ron Vickers and Les Warfield
- Headquarters: San Diego, California, U.S.
- Products: Subs, salads, soups and catering
- Website: submarina.com

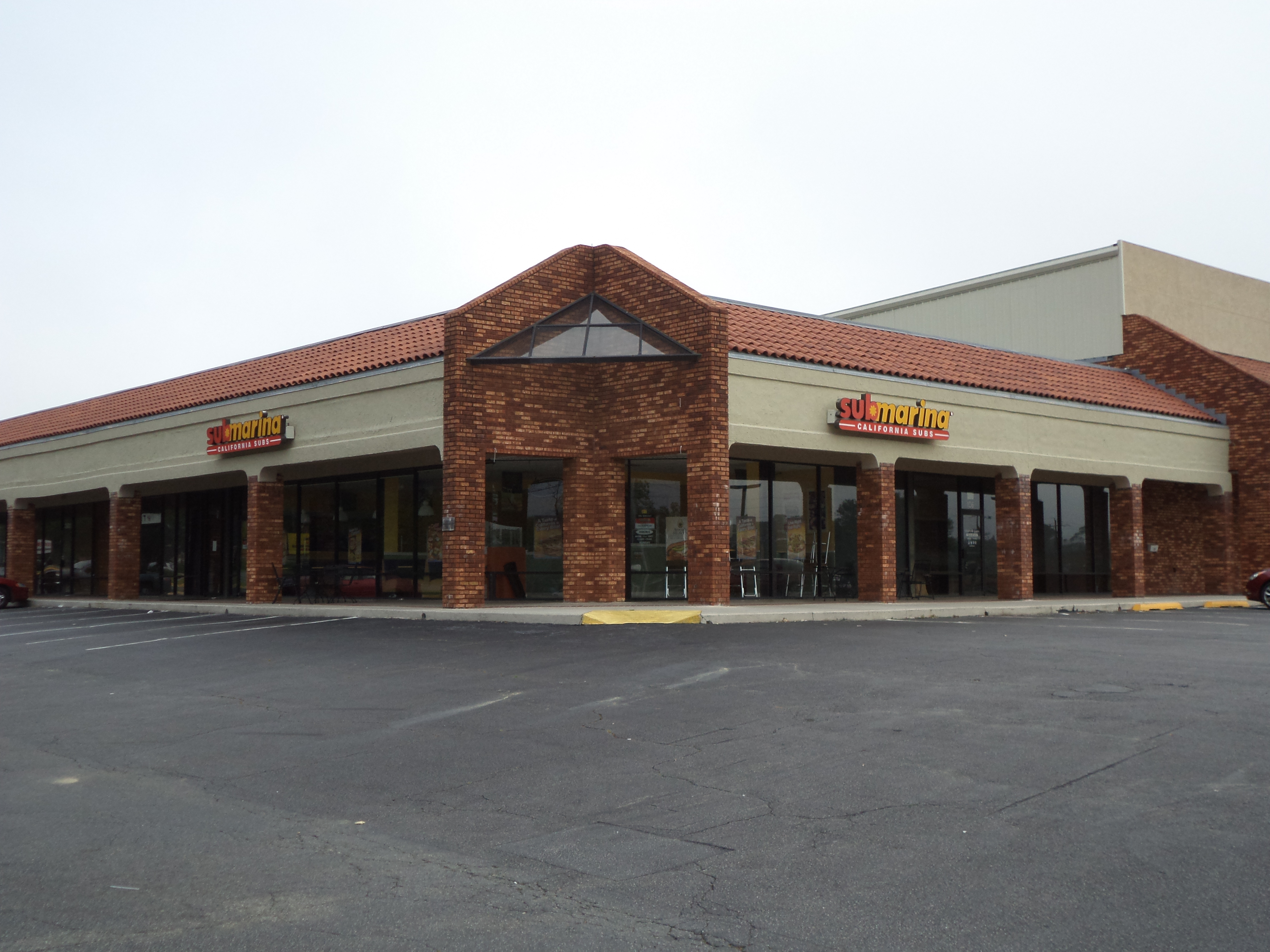
Now-defunct Submarina in Valdosta, Georgia

Submarina is an American chain of fast-food restaurants. Founded in 1977 by Ron Vickers and Les Warfield of Reno, Nevada, it specializes in submarine sandwiches. The first shop opened in Poway, California (a suburb of San Diego), and the next in 1988. There are now 20 in several states and Guam, with headquarters in San Diego.
