= Max's Steaks =

Coordinates: 40.00898°N 75.15057°W

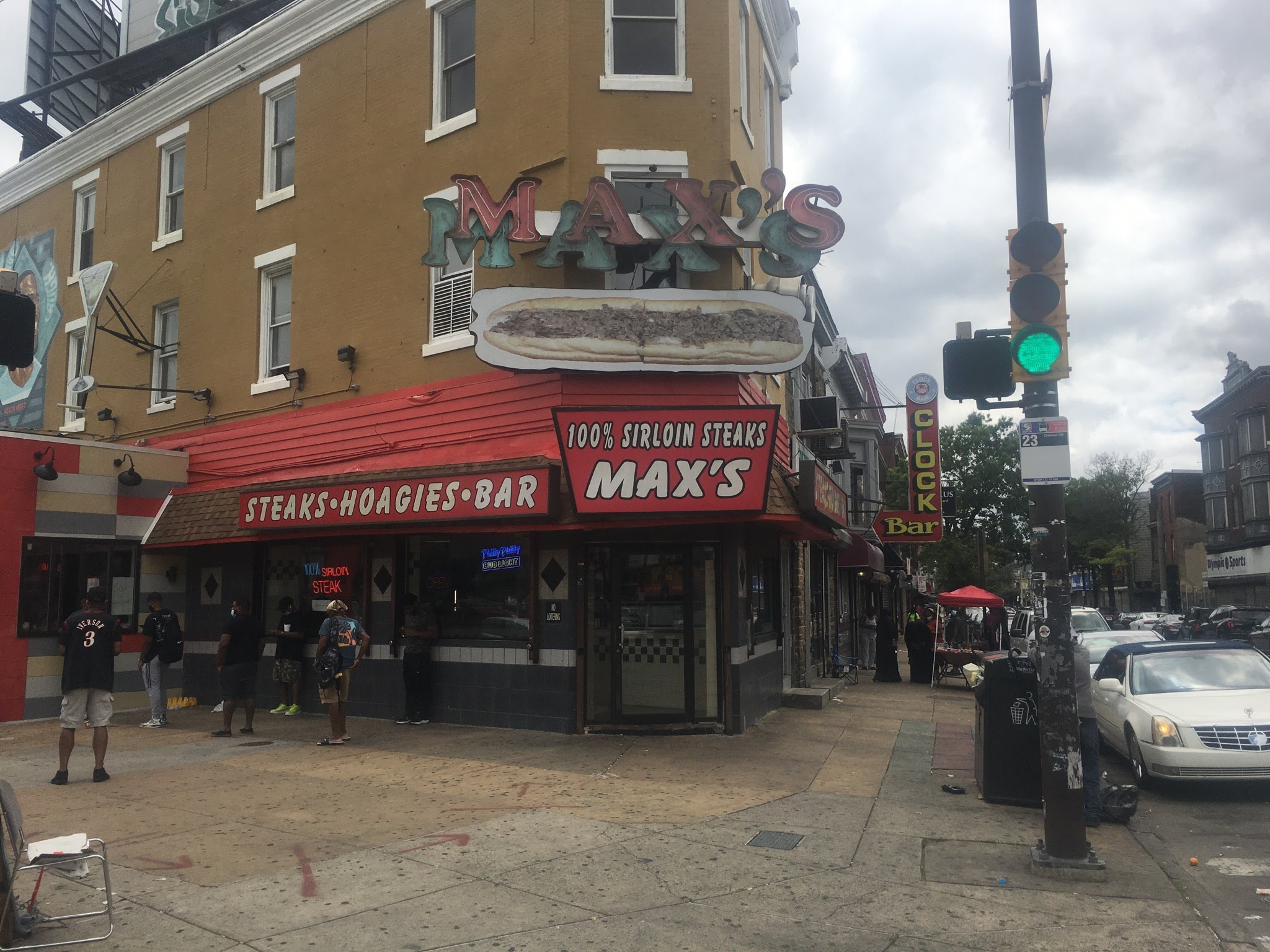
- Entrance to Max's Steaks
- Interactive map of Max's Steaks

Restaurant information
- Established: 1994; 32 years ago
- Owner: Chuck Weiner
- Food type: Cheesesteaks and other sandwiches
- Dress code: Casual
- Location: 3653 Germantown Ave, Philadelphia, United States, Pennsylvania, 19140
- Website: www.maxsteaks.com

Max's Steaks is a cheesesteak and hoagie restaurant that was founded in 1994 on Germantown Avenue in Nicetown, North Philadelphia. The restaurant is known for its whole cheesesteaks sometimes referred to as the "Giant" which is two feet long. The restaurant is attached to a bar called Eagle Bar.

== History ==
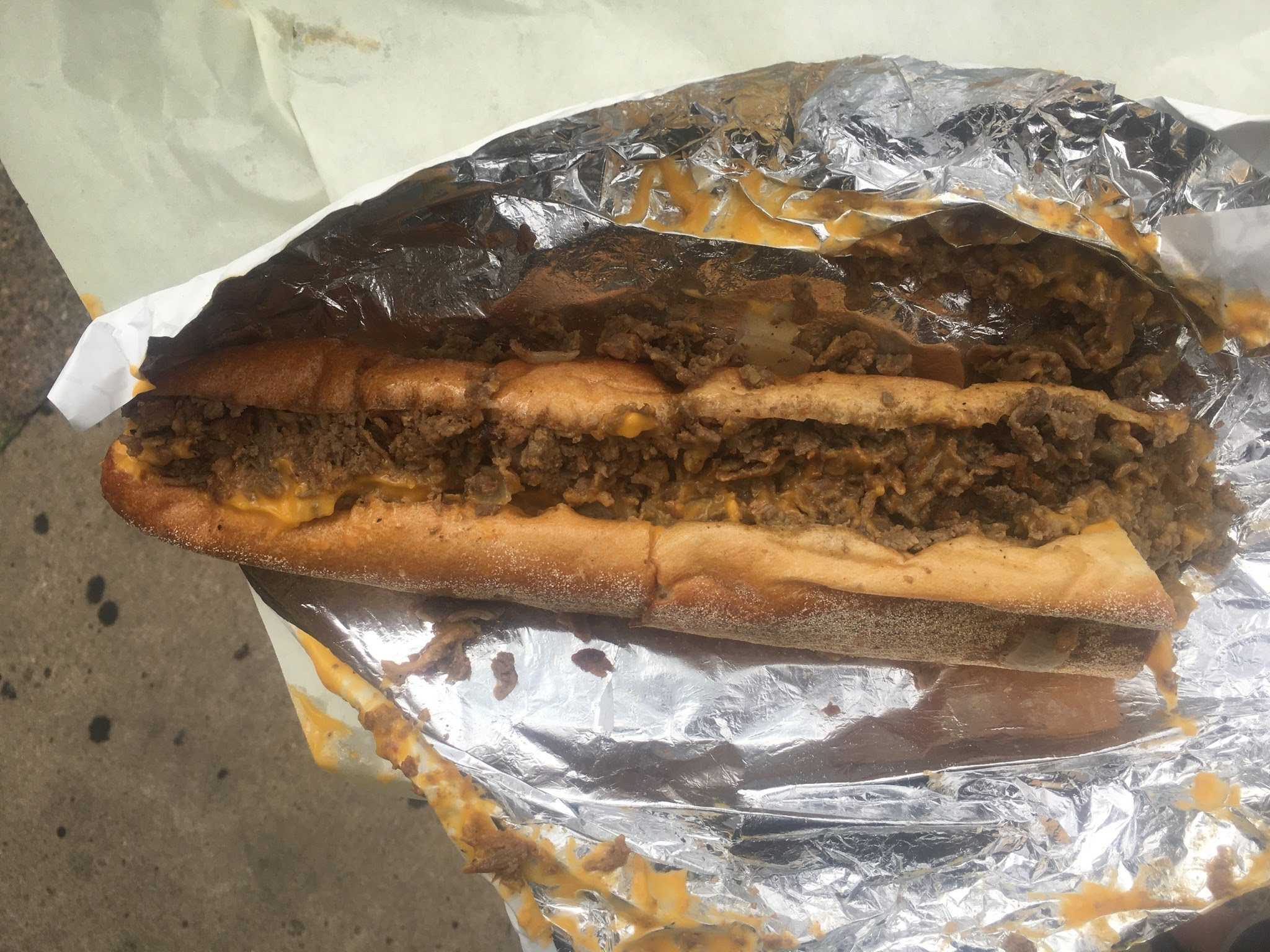
Cheesesteak from Max's Steaks with Cheez Whiz and onions

Max's Steaks was founded on Germantown Avenue in 1994 by Chuck Weiner who came up with the idea while eating lunch at Lickety Split, a former bar and pizza shop located across the street from Jim's South Street. He noticed the popularity of Jim's and believed he could open an establishment in North Philadelphia where he has owned and operated bars and other businesses. According to a local resident, "[Weiner] is always giving people an opportunity to work".

Max's is located in the inner city of North Philadelphia where there is "lower labor force participation rates". Owing to its location, Max's receives less attention from tourists and is more popular among local residents. In 2011, Robert Douglas, a cook at Max's, said he had "a lot of famous people walking in, I got Teri Woods, the author; Rick Ross, the rapper been here and Wu-Tang Clan". In 2018, DJ Khaled posted on Instagram of him stopping at Max's for a cheesesteak before getting another one at Geno's Steaks.

Philadelphia-based writer Dan McQuade wrote an article in Playboy naming Max's as the best cheesesteak in North Philadelphia, saying "Max's has the whole cheesesteak game on lock".

In 2017, Republican member of the Philadelphia City Council David Oh introduced a resolution to honor Philadelphia native Kevin Hart by designating July 6, 2017, as "Kevin Hart Day" in Philadelphia. Hundreds of people, including Hart, attended the celebration, which included a mural dedication at Max's Steaks.

== In media ==
The restaurant made a cameo in the films Creed and Creed II. In 2019, the restaurant was also featured in the television show This Is Us on the episode "The Dinner and the Date".

== See also ==
- List of submarine sandwich restaurants
