= Jersey Mike's Subs =

American sandwich shop

Jersey Mike’s Subs Inc.

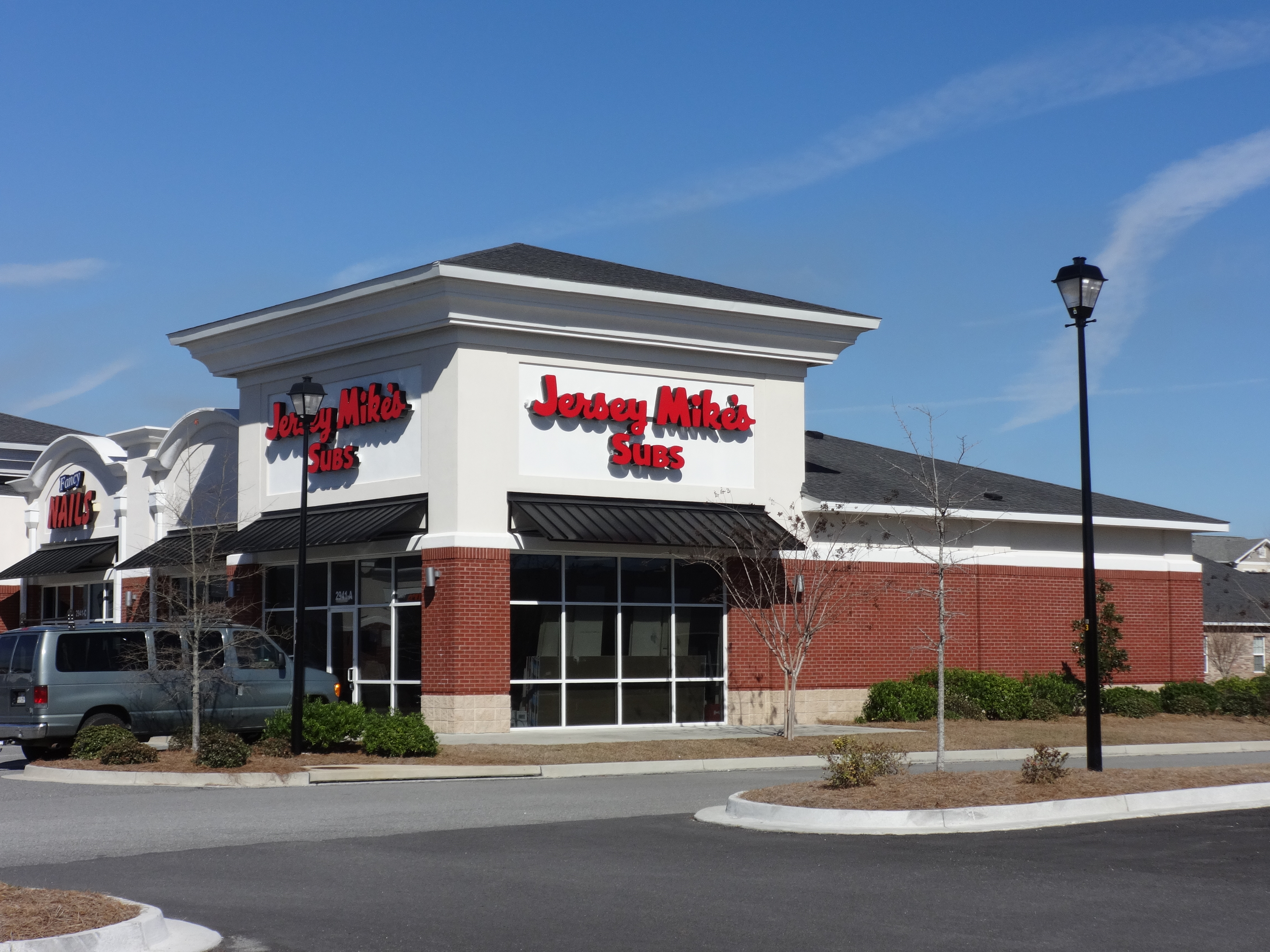
- Jersey Mike's restaurant in Valdosta, Georgia
- Trade name: Jersey Mike's Subs
- Formerly: Mike's Giant Submarine Shop (1956–1960); Mike's Submarines (1960–1975)
- Type: Public
- Traded as: NYSE: JMKE (Class A); Russell 1000 component
- Industry: Restaurants
- Genre: Fast casual
- Founded: Mike's Giant Submarine Shop: 1956; 70 years ago Point Pleasant, New Jersey, U.S. Jersey Mike's: 1975; 51 years ago
- Founder: Mike's Giant Submarine Shop: Michael Ingravallo and Marie Ingravallo; Jersey Mike's: Peter Cancro
- Headquarters: Wall Township, New Jersey, U.S.
- Number of locations: 3,000 (2026)
- Areas served: United States; Canada; Mexico; United Kingdom
- Key people: Charlie Morrison (CEO)
- Products: Subs
- Revenue: US$974.1 million (2021)
- Number of employees: 19,000 (2021)
- Parent: Blackstone Inc.
- Website: www.jerseymikes.com

Jersey Mike’s Subs Inc., is an American multinational fast-casual submarine sandwich chain headquartered in Manasquan, New Jersey. The Jersey Mike's franchise has about 3,000 locations, with locations in the United States, Canada, and elsewhere.

== History ==
=== First shop ===
In 1971, at age 14, Peter Cancro of Point Pleasant Beach, New Jersey, took a part-time job at Mike's Submarines, a neighborhood sandwich shop in the adjacent borough of Point Pleasant at 1009 Trenton Avenue. The eatery, founded in 1956, was only a few blocks west of Point Pleasant Beach High School and was then on its third owner. It was originally named Mike's Giant Submarine Shop after its original owner, Michael Ingravallo, who, with his wife Marie, owned several locations in New Jersey and Florida as part of her family's business.

Marie's father, Jimmy Lepore, immigrated from Caserta, Italy, in 1922 and opened his first submarine shop on Tremont Avenue in the Bronx. After his family moved to New Jersey, they began expanding their business, eventually opening and leasing 13 sub shops up and down the New Jersey coast. By 1979, the family had sold all but two.

When the Point Pleasant shop went up for sale again in 1975, Cancro's mother suggested he buy it. With help from a high school football coach, who was also a banker, Cancro, then 17 and a high school senior, pulled together $125,000 in three days. Cancro is the former majority owner and CEO of the company.

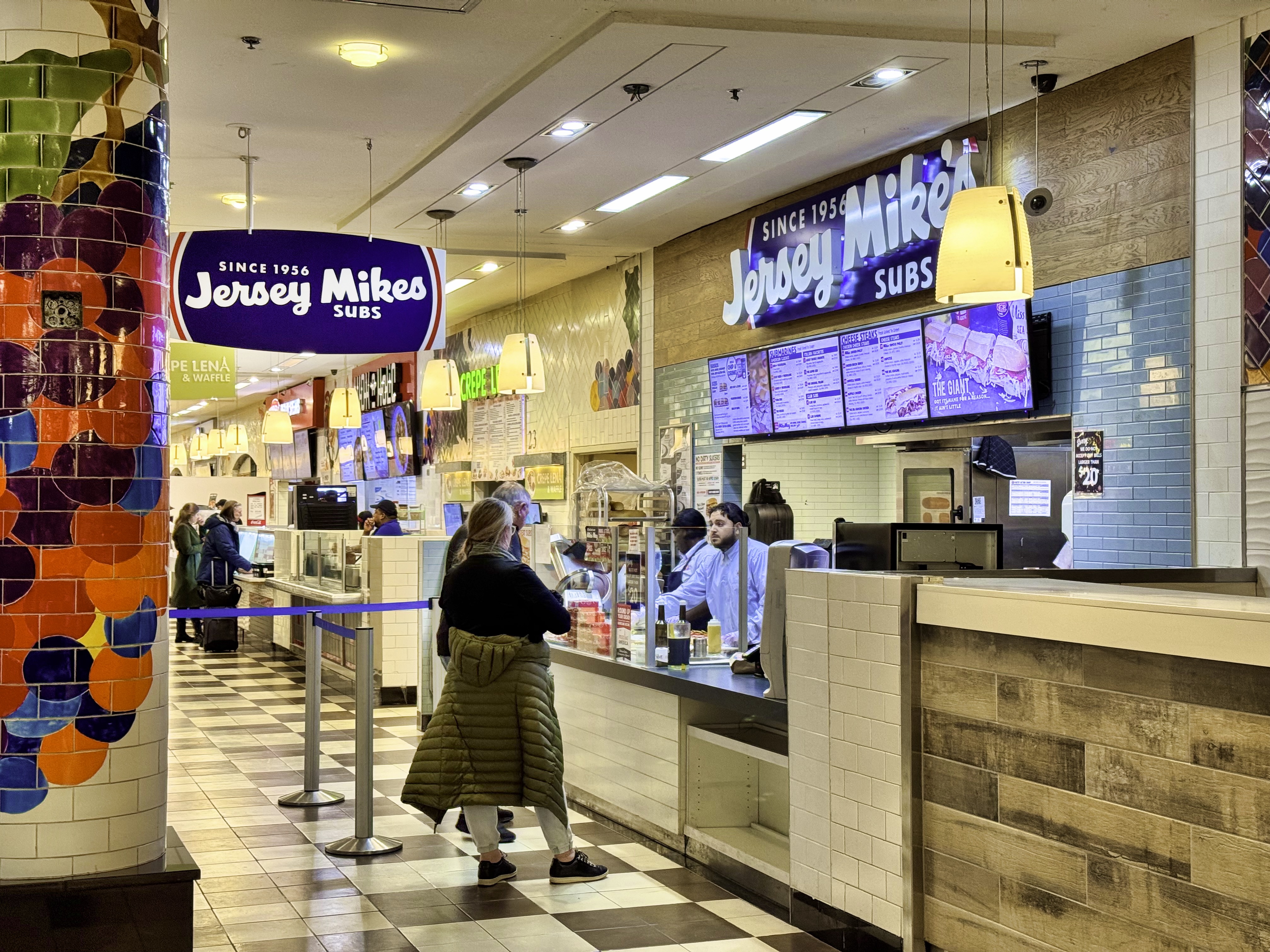
Jersey Mike's at Washington Union Station

=== Franchising ===
Cancro began franchising the restaurant in 1987. By 2014, it had 750 locations with an additional 650 in some stage of development. In 2015, 197 new locations opened and the total number of Jersey Mike's locations exceeded 1,000. Jersey Mike's locations are gaining a larger presence on the West Coast, particularly Southern California. The original Jersey Mike's location on Trenton Avenue is still used as a training center for the company.

On November 18, 2024, it was announced that Cancro had sold a majority interest in the business to Blackstone Inc. for $8 billion; the transaction was completed two months later. On April 28, 2025, Cancro was succeeded as CEO by Charlie Morrison.

=== International expansion ===
On March 2, 2016, the company opened its first Australian outlet at the Q Super Centre in Mermaid Waters, Gold Coast, Queensland, followed by a second outlet in Benowa Village later that month. Then a third outlet in Browns Plains, Queensland. These were all closed by late 2020, apparently due to the COVID pandemic.

In 2021, the company opened an outlet at the Andares Shopping Mall in Guadalajara, Jalisco, Mexico. In January 2024, the company announced a major Canadian expansion with Redberry Restaurants, a large Canadian restaurant operator, in what would be the first major international expansion, with three Ontario locations currently opened in Kitchener, London and Markham, Ontario, with a planned target goal of 300 outlets in the next decade.

In the United Kingdom, Jersey Mike's began sponsoring the EFL Trophy football tournament under the name Jersey Mike's Trophy on a five-year deal commencing from the 2026–27 season. This advertising push was followed in November 2026 by the opening of the first British Jersey Mike's outlet, located on Argyll Street in the West End of London, with plans for an expansion to 300 more outlets across the country.

== Products ==
Like the original 1956 Mike's store, each Jersey Mike's Subs restaurant serves submarine sandwiches, which are made to order, slicing the meats and cheeses as needed. Ordering a sandwich "Mike's Way" tops it with sliced onions, shredded lettuce, tomatoes, oregano, salt, and a red wine vinegar, olive oil and vegetable oil blend (otherwise known as "The Juice"). There is also a signature chopped pepper relish (also called "CPR"), though this isn't included in Mike's Way.

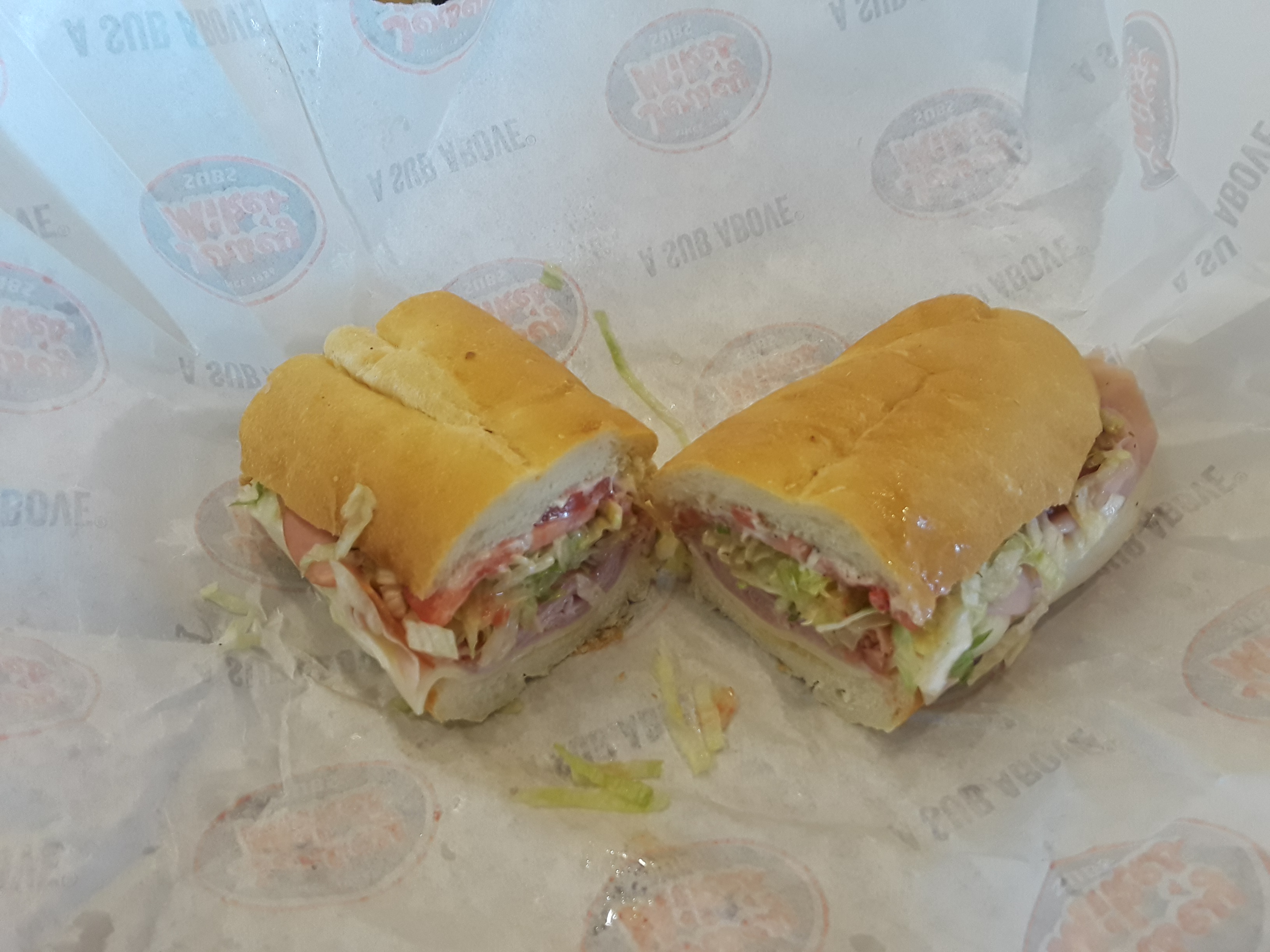
A "Jersey Shore's Favorite"—provolone, ham, and cappacuolo—on white bread

Some Jersey Mike's locations also serve various breakfast sandwiches during the morning hours, including sandwiches made with pork roll, a New Jersey product.

== Advertising ==
In September 2022, Jersey Mike's began featuring actor Danny DeVito in its radio and television commercials. DeVito grew up a few miles away from the original Jersey Mike's.

== See also ==
- List of submarine sandwich restaurants
