= Submarine sandwich =

Type of sandwich originating from the United States

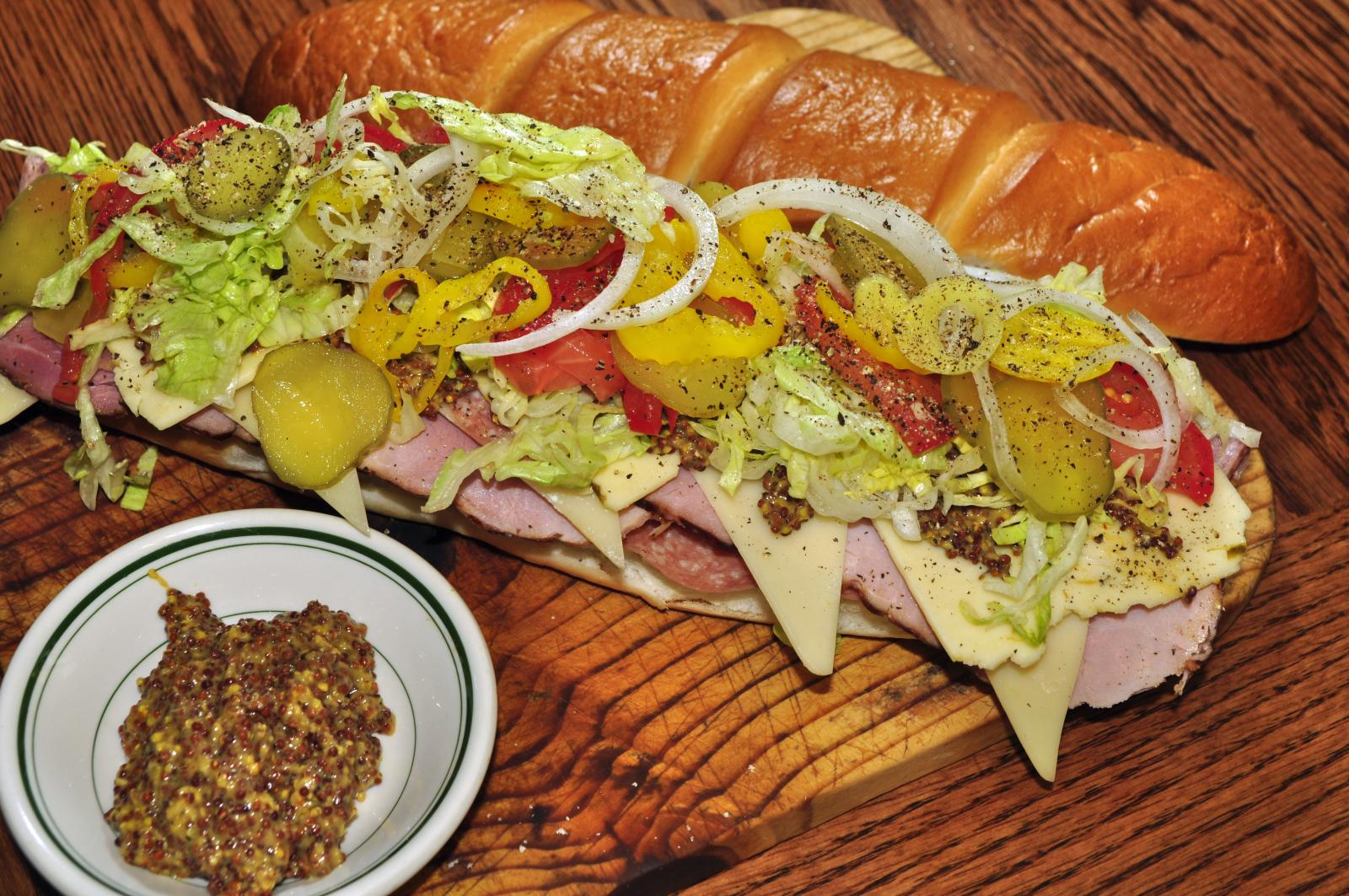
- Submarine sandwich made with cold cuts, next to a bowl of dijon mustard
- Alternative names: List: Bomber; Garibaldi; Grinder; Hero; Hoagie; Italian (or Maine Italian); Muffaletta; Poor boy; Rocket; Torpedo; Zep
- Type: Sandwich
- Place of origin: United States
- Region or state: Northeast United States
- Associated cuisine: Italian-American cuisine
- Main ingredients: Submarine roll

A submarine sandwich, commonly known as a sub, is a type of American cold or hot sandwich made from a submarine roll (an elongated bread roll) that is split lengthwise and filled with meats, cheeses, vegetables, and condiments.

Although "submarine" or just "sub" is the general term for both the bread roll and sandwiches made with it in both the US and other English speaking nations, there are many local nicknames, especially in the northeastern United States, such as hoagie (Philadelphia English and Western Pennsylvania English), hero (New York City English), Italian (Maine English), grinder (New England English, Fulton County, NY), wedge (Westchester, NY) or spuckie (Boston English).

== History ==
This sandwich type originated in several different Italian-American communities in the northeastern United States from the late 19th to the mid-20th centuries. The popularity of the Italian-American sandwich grew from its origins in Connecticut, Pennsylvania, Delaware, Maine, Maryland, New Hampshire, New York, New Jersey, Massachusetts, and Rhode Island to other parts of the United States, often as local pizzerias began adding the sub to their menus.

Pizzerias may have been among the first Italian-American eateries, but even at the turn of the [20th] century distinctions were clear-cut as to what constituted a true ristorante. To be merely a pizza-maker was to be at the bottom of the culinary and social scale; so many pizzeria owners began offering other dishes, including the hero sandwich (also, depending on the region of the United States, called a 'wedge,' a 'hoagie,' a 'sub,' or a 'grinder') made on an Italian loaf of bread with lots of salami, cheese, and peppers.

— John Mariani, America Eats Out, p. 66

As the sandwich's popularity grew, small restaurants called hoagie shops or sub shops, which specialized in offering the sandwich, began to open across the United States. There are many chain restaurants that specialize in subs across the United States. The sandwich is also often available at supermarkets, local delis, and convenience stores. They include Wawa, which annually runs a sub promotional event during the summer called Hoagiefest, and Publix, whose sandwiches are often referred to as "pub subs".

== Etymology ==
In a 1967 article in American Speech, linguists Edwin Eames and Howard Robboy identified thirteen different terms for the submarine sandwich in the United States in a survey of 100 American cities. The names, ranked by most widespread use, were: submarine, hoagie, poor boy, grinder, torpedo, Italian sandwich, hero, rocket, zeppelin, Garibaldi, bomber, musalatta, and Cuban sandwich. Eames and Robboy noted that "submarine" was the only term that was not regional in some way. Some of the least common of the names were identified in only one city, including Garibaldi in Madison, Wisconsin and musalatta (or muffuletta) in New Orleans.

=== Submarine ===
The use of the term "submarine" or "sub" (after the resemblance of the roll to the shape of a submarine) is widespread in the United States and Canada. Some accounts source the name as originating in New London, Connecticut (near the site of a United States Navy submarine base from 1915 onwards) in the World War II era. Written advertisements from 1940 in Wilmington, Delaware, indicate the term originated prior to the United States entering World War II.

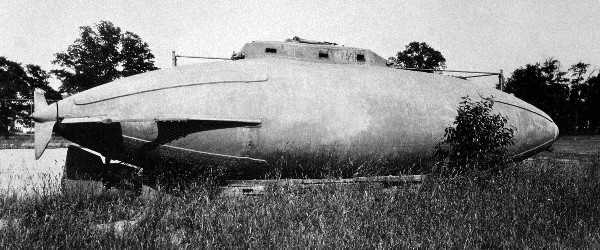
Fenian Ram submarine, c. 1920

One theory says the submarine sandwich was brought to the U.S. by Dominic Conti (1874–1954), an Italian immigrant who came to New York in the late 19th century. He supposedly named it "submarine roll" after seeing the recovered 1901 submarine called Fenian Ram in the Paterson Museum of New Jersey in 1928. His granddaughter said:

My grandfather came to this country circa 1895 from Montella, Italy. Around 1910, he started his grocery store, called Dominic Conti's Grocery Store, on Mill Street in Paterson, New Jersey where he was selling the traditional Italian sandwiches. His sandwiches were made from a recipe he brought with him from Italy, which consisted of a long crust roll, filled with cold cuts, topped with lettuce, tomatoes, peppers, onions, oil, vinegar, Italian herbs and spices, salt, and pepper. The sandwich started with a layer of cheese and ended with a layer of cheese (this was so the bread wouldn't get soggy).

=== Hoagie ===
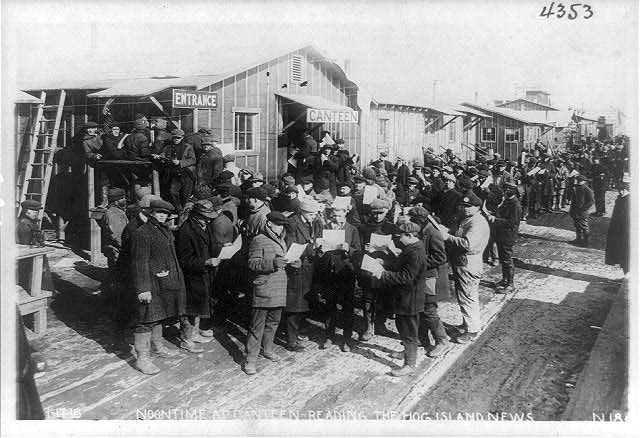
Workers read the Hog Island News

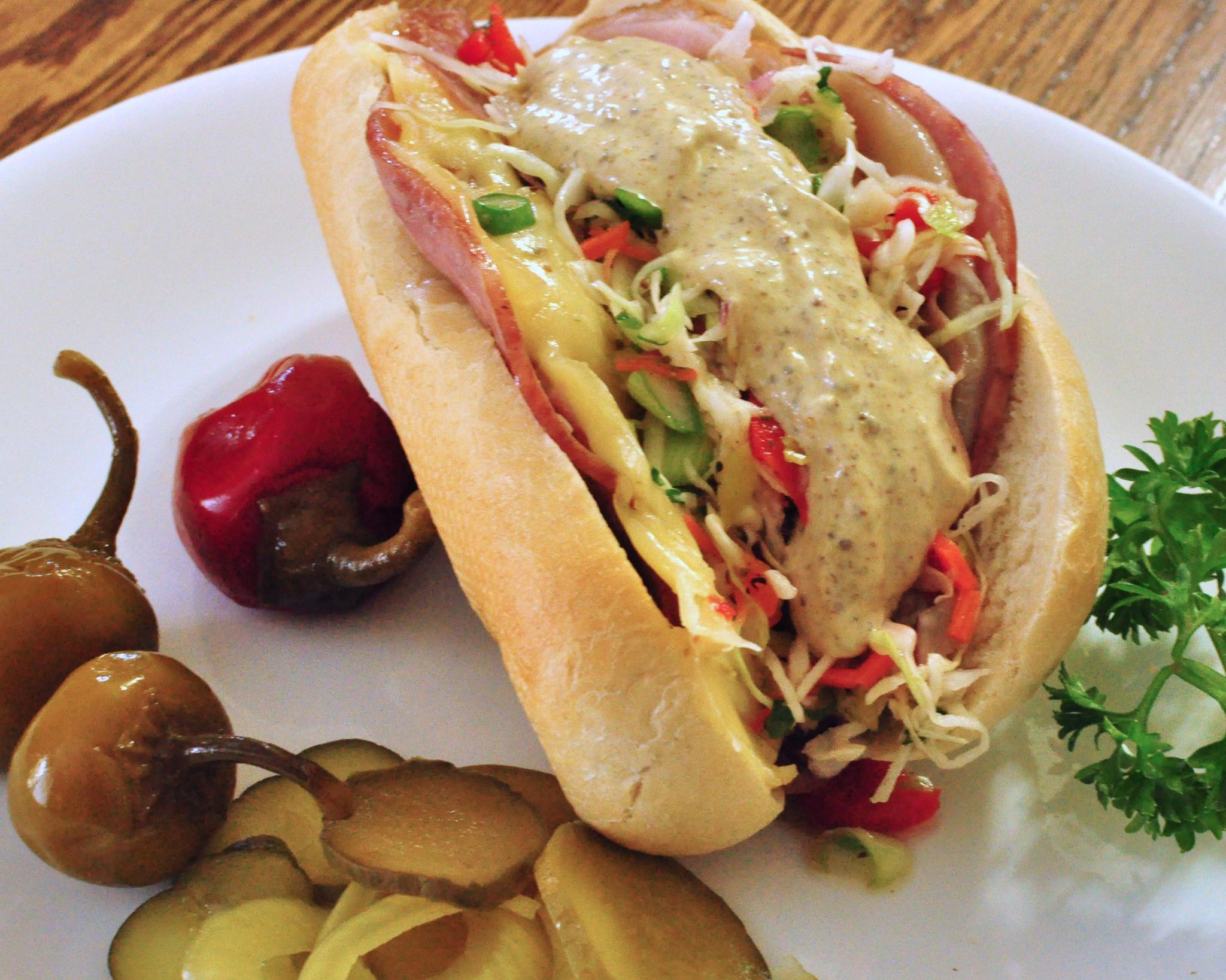
Salami, ham and cheeses on a hoagie roll

The term hoagie originated in the Philadelphia area. Eames and Robboy found that hoagie was regional to Pennsylvania and New Jersey.There are a number of hypotheses about the origin of the term:

1. In 1953, a reader letter to the Philadelphia Bulletin reported that Italian-Americans working at the World War I–era shipyard known as Hog Island, where emergency shipping was produced for the war effort, introduced the sandwich by putting various meats, cheeses, and lettuce between two slices of bread. This became known as the "Hog Island" sandwich; shortened to "Hoggies", then the "hoagie".
2. Dictionary.com offers the following origin of the term hoagie - n. American English (originally Philadelphia) word for "hero, large sandwich made from a long, split roll"; originally hoggie (c. 1936), traditionally said to be named for the jazz musician Hoagy Carmichael (1899–1981), but the use of the word predates his celebrity and the original spelling seems to suggest another source (perhaps "hog"). The modern spelling dates from about 1945; it may have been altered by influence of Carmichael's nickname.
3. The Philadelphia Almanac and Citizen's Manual offers a different explanation saying the sandwich was created by early-twentieth-century street vendors called "hokey-pokey men", who sold antipasto salad, meats, cookies, and buns with a cut in them. When Gilbert and Sullivan's operetta H.M.S. Pinafore opened in Philadelphia in 1879, bakeries produced a long loaf called the pinafore. Entrepreneurial "hokey-pokey men" sliced the loaf in half, stuffed it with antipasto salad, and sold the world's first "hoagie". This hypothesis seems unlikely, as "hokey pokey" men were known street vendors of an ice cream product.
4. Another explanation is that the word hoagie arose in the late 19th to early 20th centuries, among the Italian community in South Philadelphia; at the time "on the hoke" meant that someone was destitute. Deli owners gave away scraps of cheeses and meats in an Italian bread-roll known as a "hokie", but Italian immigrants pronounced it "hoagie".
5. Yet another possible origin of the term, as conveyed by sociology professor Howard Robboy, is that a man in Philadelphia, Alphonso DePalma, who later opened a sandwich shop there, claimed to have said in 1928, "You have to be a hog to eat one of those." DePalma styled himself as "King of the Hoggies" (and eventually "Hoagies") and at one time had several "hoggie" shops around the city.

Shortly after World War II, there were numerous varieties of the term in use throughout Philadelphia. By the 1940s, the spelling "hoagie" dominated less-used variations like "hoogie" and "hoggie". By 1955, restaurants throughout the area were using the term hoagie. Listings in Pittsburgh show hoagies arriving in 1961 and becoming widespread in that city by 1966.

Former Philadelphia mayor (and later Pennsylvania governor) Ed Rendell declared the hoagie to be the "Official Sandwich of Philadelphia". However, there are claims that the hoagie was actually a product of nearby Chester, Pennsylvania. DiCostanza's in Boothwyn, Pennsylvania claims that the mother of DiConstanza's owner originated the hoagie in 1925 in Chester. DiCostanza relates the story that a customer came into the family deli and through an exchange matching the customer's requests and the deli's offerings, the hoagie was created. Additional spellings include "hoagy". The hoagie is a common menu item in modern Philadelphia delis. Eateries such as Campo's, Geno's Steaks, and Pat's King of Steaks all offer hoagies on their menu.

Woolworth's to-go sandwich was called a hoagie in all of its U.S. stores. Bánh mì sandwiches are sometimes referred to as "Vietnamese hoagies" in Philadelphia.

=== Hero ===
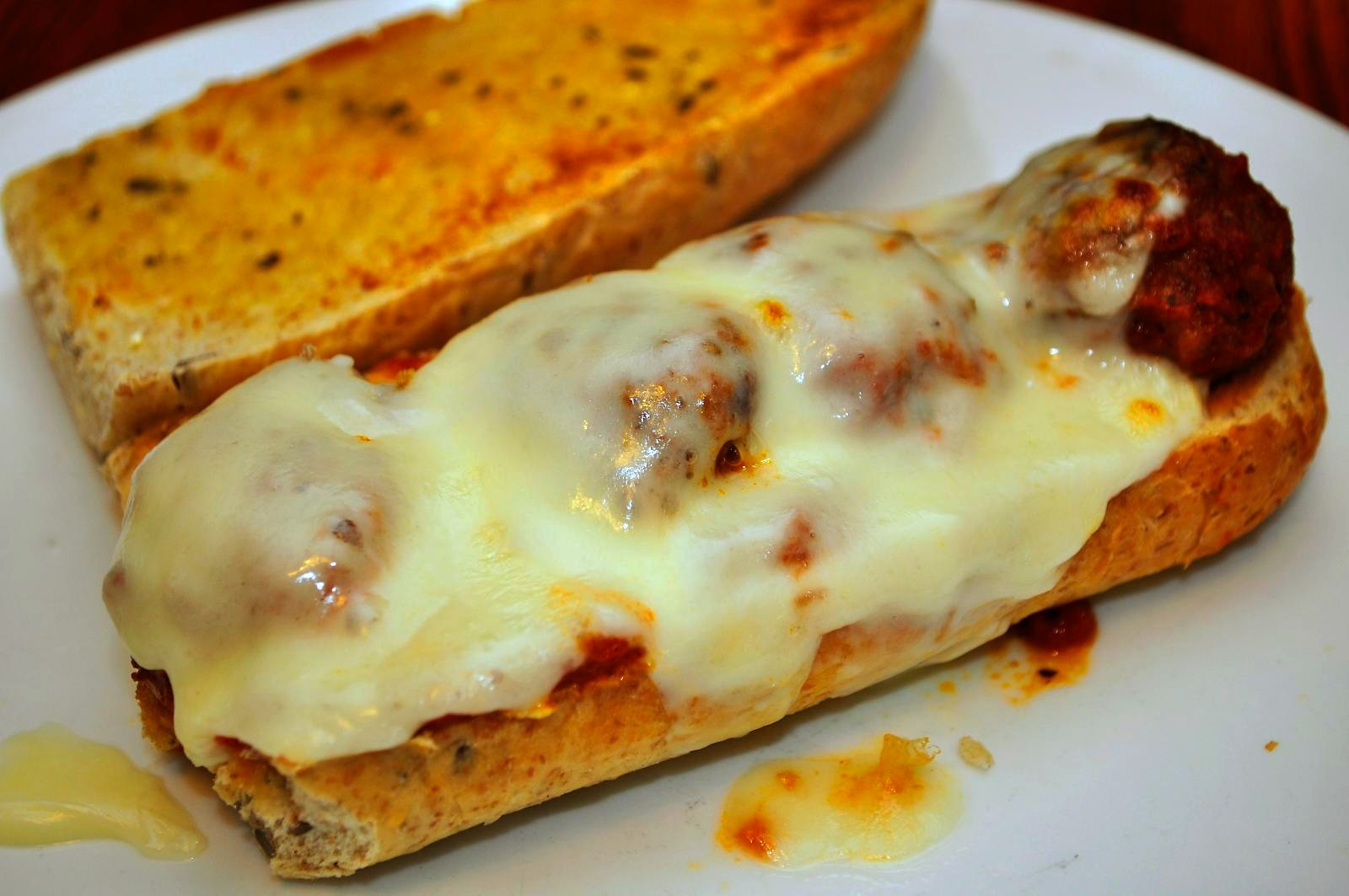
New York style meatball hero with mozzarella

The New York term hero is first attested in 1937. The name is sometimes credited to the New York Herald Tribune food writer Clementine Paddleford in the 1930s, but there is no good evidence for the claim. It is also sometimes said that it is related to the gyro; that is unlikely as the gyro was unknown in the United States until the 1960s. Hero (plural usually heros not heroes) remains the prevailing New York City term for most sandwiches on an oblong roll with a generally Italian flavor, in addition to the original described above. Pizzeria menus often include eggplant parmigiana, chicken parmigiana, and meatball heros, each served with sauce.

=== Grinder ===
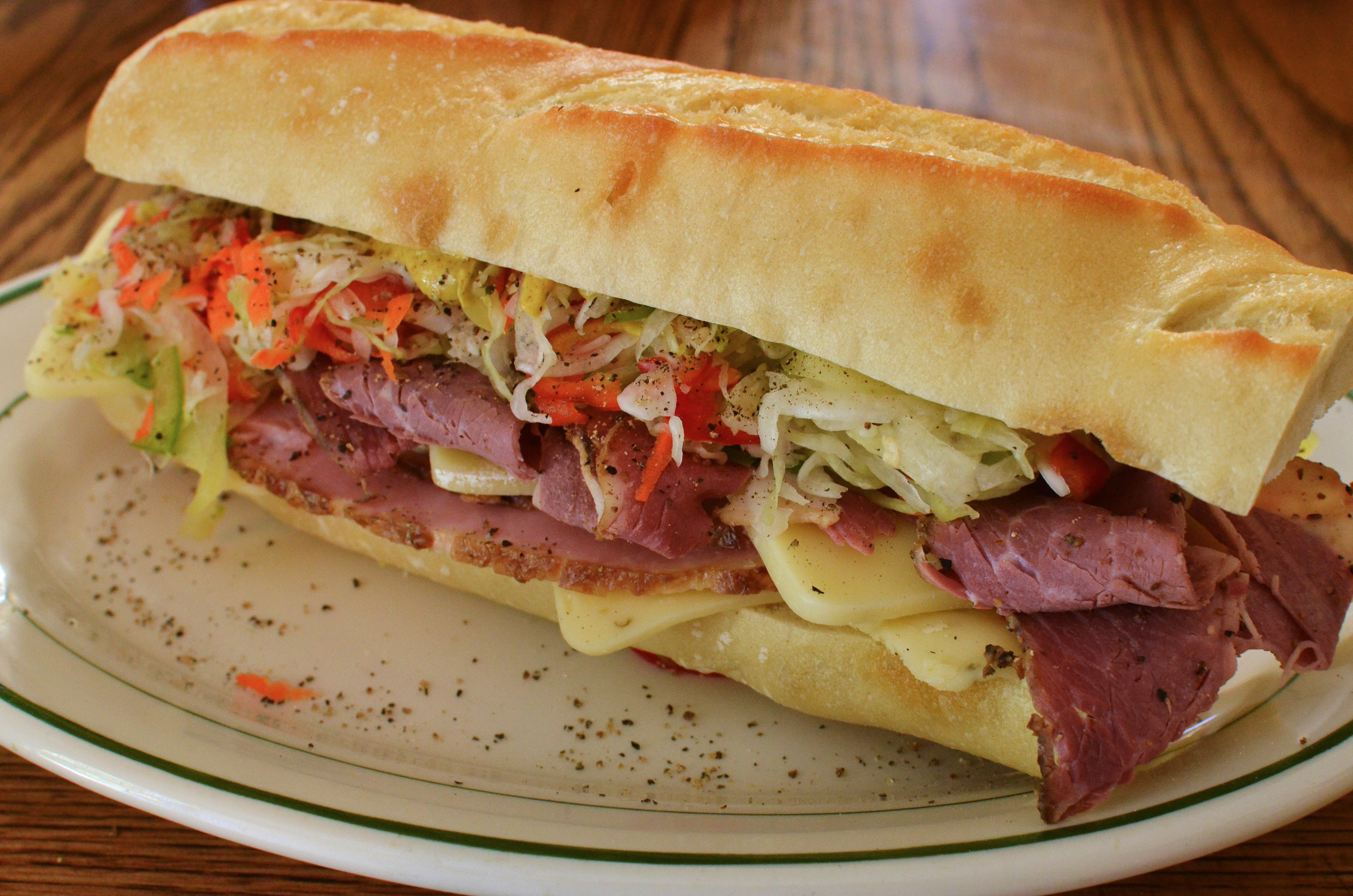
Pastrami grinder

A common term in New England, especially Connecticut, Massachusetts, and Rhode Island is grinder; its origin has several possibilities. One theory says it is derived from Italian-American slang for a dock worker, among whom the sandwich was popular. Others say that it was called a grinder because the bread's hard crust required much chewing, and that it would grind one's teeth. In Pennsylvania, New York, and parts of New England, the term grinder usually refers to a hot submarine sandwich (meatball, sausage, etc.), whereas a cold sandwich (e.g., cold cuts) is usually called a "sub". In the Philadelphia area, the term grinder is also applied to any hoagie that is toasted in the oven after assembly, whether or not it is made with traditionally hot ingredients.

=== Italian ===
The term Maine Italian or simply Italian is used in Maine. Local folklore claims that a baker named Giovanni Amato invented the Italian in 1899.

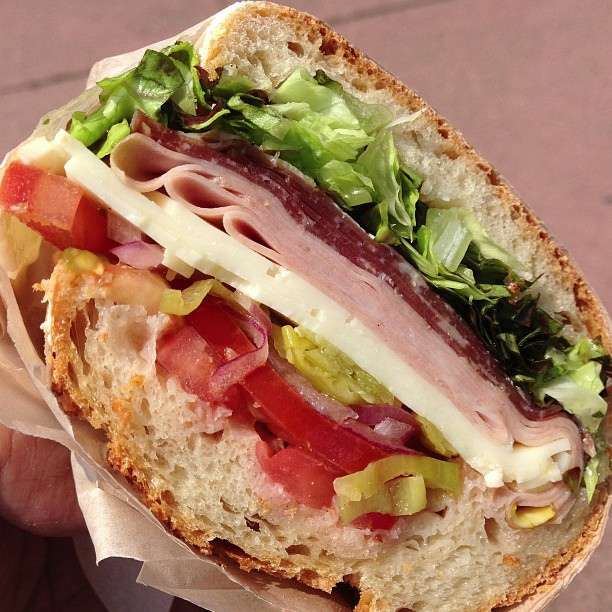
A cross-section of an Italian sandwich

The traditional Maine Italian sandwich is prepared using a long, soft bread roll or bun with ham and bologna along with American cheese, tomato, onion, green bell pepper, Greek olives, pickles, olive oil or salad oil, salt and cracked black pepper. Additional ingredients, such as pepperoni, banana pepper, or lettuce may be added to the sandwich. The sandwich is often cut in half to make it easier to handle.

=== Wedge ===
The term wedge is used in the New York counties of Dutchess, Putnam, and Westchester, as well as the Connecticut county of Fairfield–four counties directly north of New York City. Some base the name wedge on a diagonal cut in the middle of the sandwich, creating two halves or "wedges", or a "wedge" cut out of the top half of the bread with the fillings "wedged" in between, or a sandwich that is served between two "wedges" of bread. It has been said that wedge is short for "sandwich", with the name having originated from an Italian deli owner located in Yonkers, who got tired of saying the whole word.

=== Spukie ===
The term spukie ("spukkie" or "spuckie") is unique to the city of Boston and derives from the Italian word spuccadella, meaning "long roll". The word spuccadella is not typically found in Italian dictionaries, which may suggest that it could be a regional Italian dialect, or possibly a Boston Italian-American innovation. Spukie is typically heard in parts of Dorchester and South Boston. Some bakeries in Boston's North End neighborhood have homemade spuccadellas for sale.

=== Other names ===
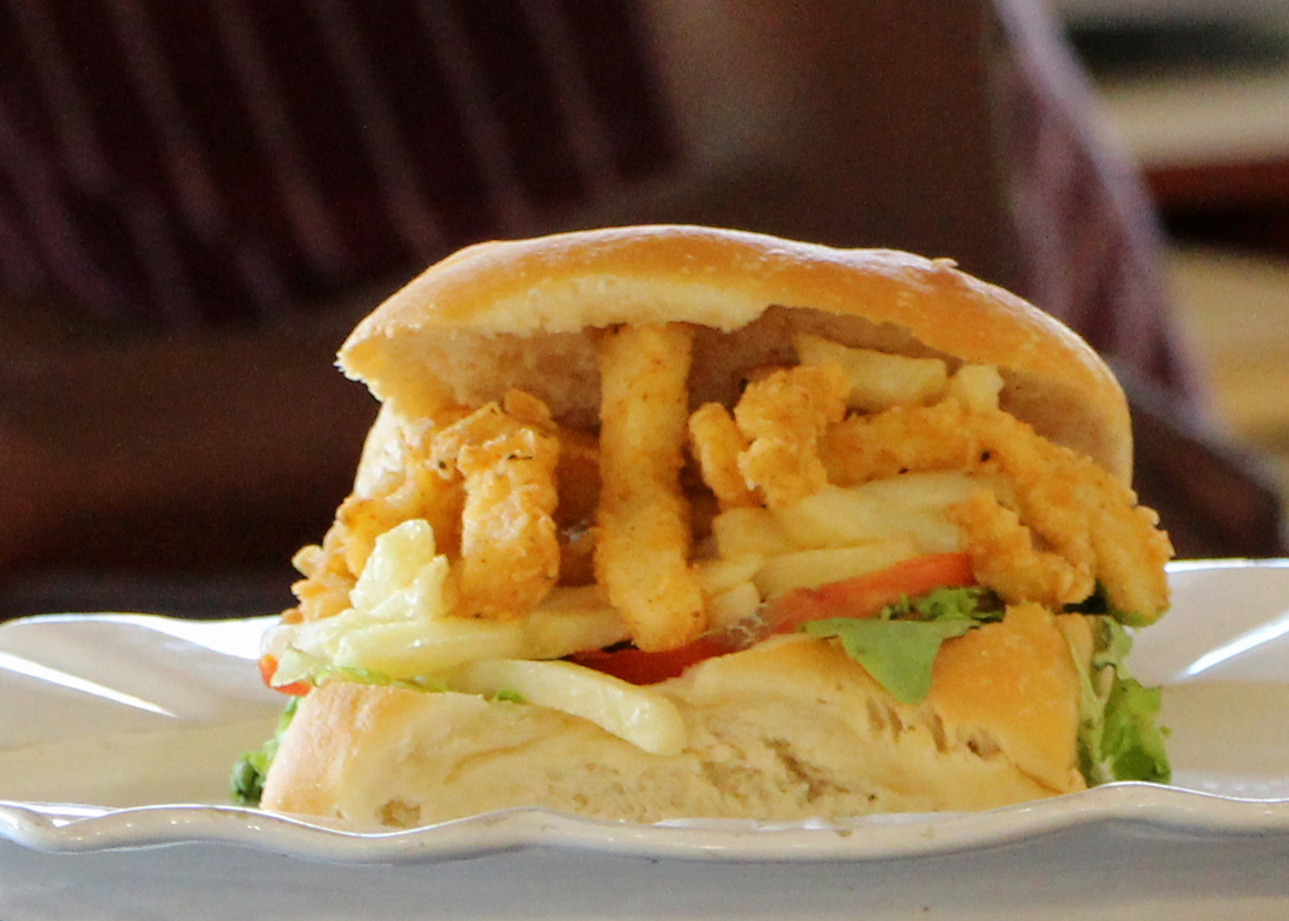
A Gatsby sandwich in South Africa

==== In the US ====
- Blimpie (shaped like a blimp) – from the Hoboken, New Jersey–founded chain, Blimpie
- Po' boy – Louisiana
- Cosmo – Williamsport, Pennsylvania
- Zep (short for zeppelin) – Norristown, Pennsylvania

==== Elsewhere ====
- Smoske – Belgium (made with baguette)
- Dagobert – Belgium (made with baguette)
- Gatsby – Cape Town, South Africa
- Conti roll – Western Australia
- Torpedo Sandwich – Brazil

=== Party sub ===
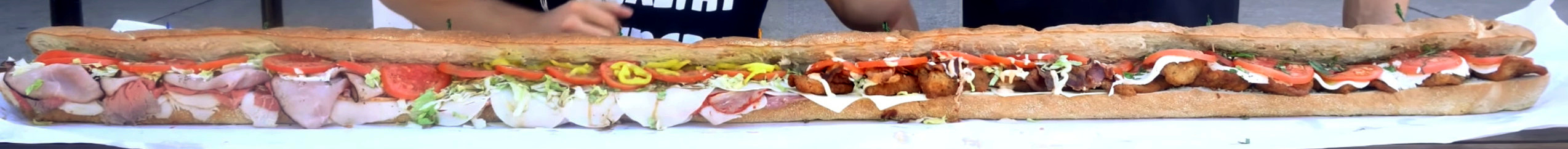
A very long party sub

A party sub is a particularly long submarine sandwich, usually cut into pieces and served to guests at parties.

== International popularity ==
Subs or their national equivalents were already popular in many European, Asian, and Australasian countries when late 20th-century franchisee chain restaurants such as Subway and fast food outlets made them even more popular and increased the prevalence of the word sub. Many outlets offer non-traditional ingredient combinations. Major international chains include Firehouse Subs, Quiznos, Mr. Sub, Jersey Mike's, Jimmy John's, Potbelly Sandwich Shop, and the largest restaurant chain in the world, Subway.

== See also ==
- Bánh mì
- Cuban sandwich
- Dagwood sandwich
- French dip
- List of American sandwiches
- List of regional dishes of the United States
- List of sandwiches
- List of submarine sandwich restaurants
- Muffuletta
- Panini
