= Tasti D-Lite =

Frozen yogurt chain

Tasti D-Lite, LLC
- Type: Private
- Founded: 1987 in New York
- Headquarters: Scottsdale, Arizona, US
- Products: Frozen Desserts
- Revenue: money
- Owner: Kahala Brands
- Number of employees: 100
- Website: tastidlite.com

Tasti D-Lite is a New York–based fast food company and operates a system of franchise chain stores which are predominantly located in New York state, although the company's corporate headquarters are now in Arizona.

== Overview ==
Tasti D-Lite was acquired in 2007 by NY-based private equity group SPG Partners LLC and announced that James H. Amos, one of the firm's operating partners, will serve as Chief Executive Officer of Tasti D-Lite. The new company would be headquartered in Franklin, Tennessee.

A redesigned website was launched in 2007 listing nutritional information for over 100 flavors. Tasti D-Lite announced in 2008 that it will begin a franchise offering to facilitate the growth of the brand to markets both domestic and international. Subsequently, a majority of the original licensed stores signed agreements to convert to the franchise model. Also in 2008, the first international development agreement was signed for South Korea.

In June 2015, Quick-Service Restaurant Franchisor Kahala Brands purchased Tasti D-Lite along with smoothie chain Planet Smoothie. Kahala Brands is owned by the Serruya family of Canada and is the franchisor of about a dozen fast food, treat and sandwich chains such as Blimpie and Cold Stone Creamery. Together, the 128 Tasti D-Lite and Planet Smoothie locations will now be run from the Kahala Brands corporate headquarters in Scottsdale, Arizona.

== Criticism & Reception ==
In 2002, published studies found that the company may have greatly exaggerated claims of its product's healthfulness. Tasti D-Lite subsequently implemented an overrun compliance program and settled the nutritional claims matter with the New York City Department of Consumer Affairs.

== In popular culture ==
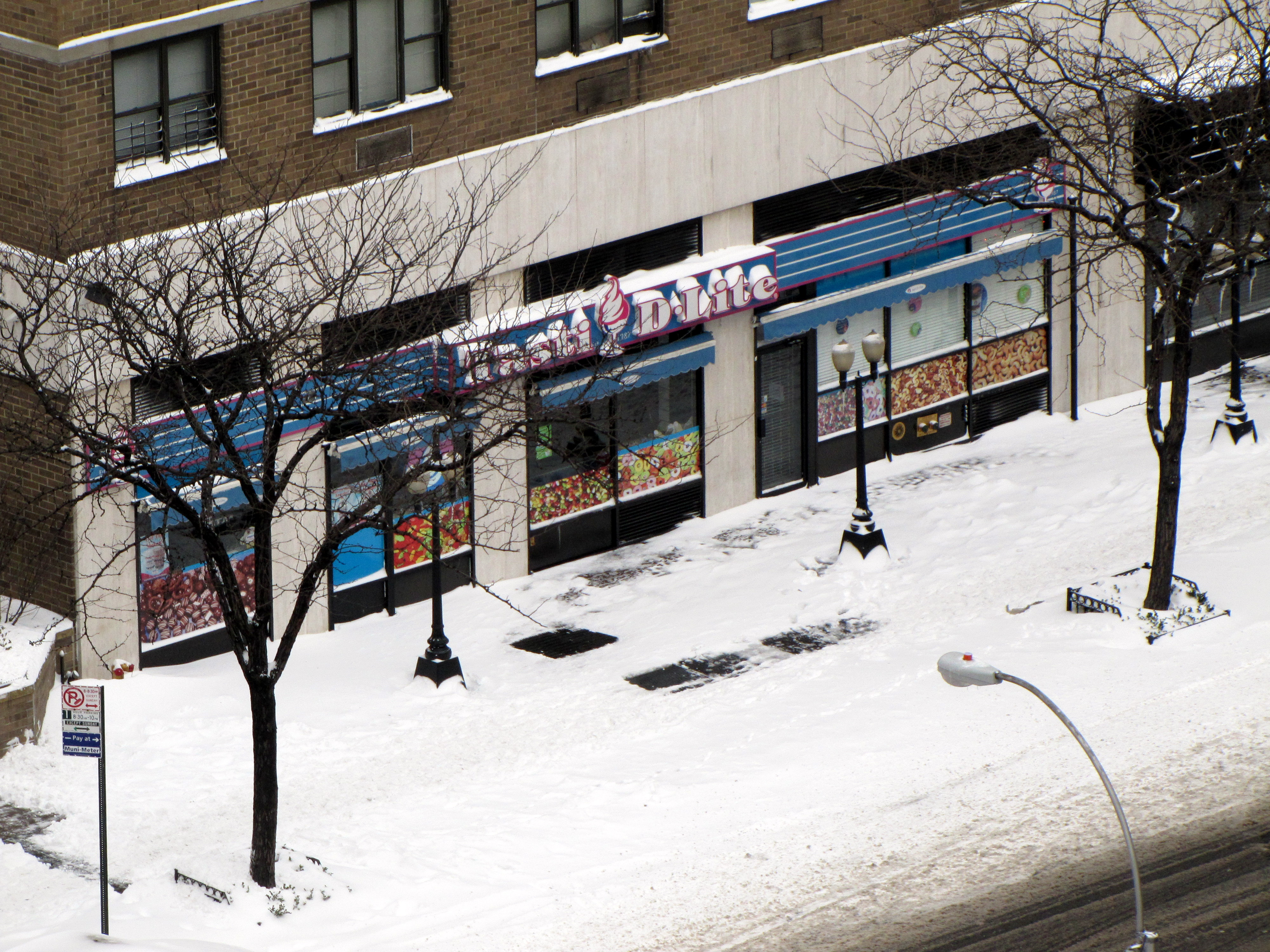
Shop on 3rd Avenue, Manhattan

In 2002, Tasti D-Lite was mentioned in episodes of HBO’s Sex and the City season 4 episode 15, when Miranda and Carrie go shopping for Carrie’s wedding dress. Later, in season 6 episode 14, it is mentioned again. At first, when Charlotte wants Harry to try some, and then when Carrie is writing on her column. The brand was also mentioned in The Apprentice season 2 episode 18. The brand was also featured in season 6 episode 5 of 30 Rock. Liz Lemon watches a business tape that tells her to set her negotiation meeting on her "home turf." She blurts out "ice cream store!" Liz Lemon and Jack Donaghy then negotiate inside a Tasti D-Lite. Additionally, it is mentioned in Lena Dunham’s book of essays Not That Kind of Girl, in the chapter titled "Is This Even Real?"

== See also ==
- List of frozen dessert brands
