= Planet Smoothie =

American smoothie chain

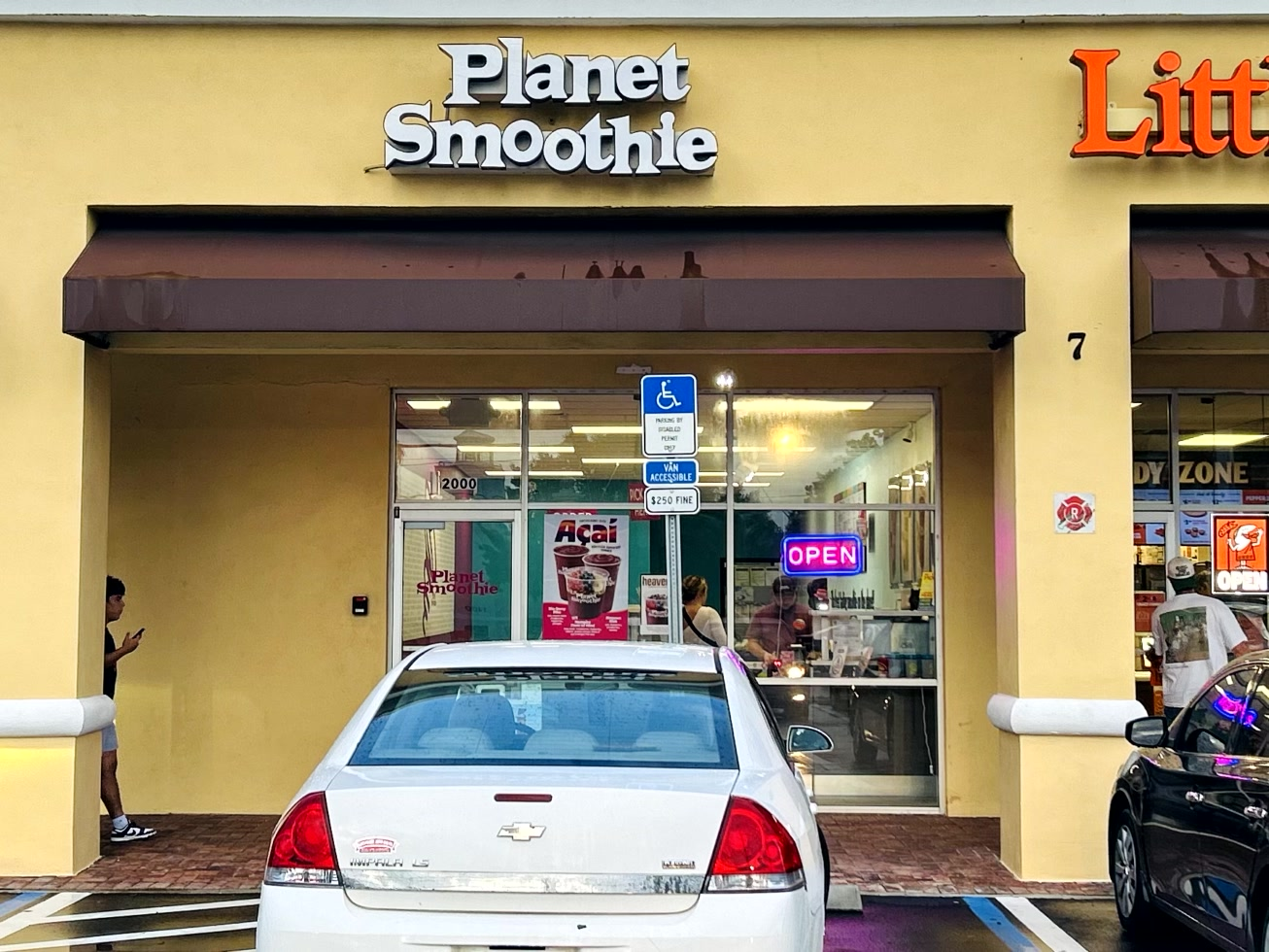
- Planet Smoothie storefront in Florida
- Type: Private
- Industry: Food and beverage
- Founded: 1995; 31 years ago Atlanta, Georgia, U.S.
- Headquarters: Scottsdale, Arizona, U.S
- Number of locations: 125
- Area served: United States
- Products: Smoothies
- Parent: Kahala Brands
- Website: planetsmoothie.com

Planet Smoothie is the third largest American chain of smoothie stores serving smoothies. The company was founded in 1995 by Martin Sprock in Atlanta, Georgia, and currently operates more than 100 locations.

== History ==
In November, 2011, Planet Smoothie was acquired by Tasti D-Lite LLC who also operates Tasti D-Lite stores. In June 2015, Quick-Service Restaurant Franchisor Kahala Brands purchased both Planet Smoothie and Tasti D-Lite in a deal that brings their 128 locations into the portfolio of about a dozen fast food, treat and sandwich chains such as Blimpie and Cold Stone Creamery owned by the Serruya family of Canada. Together, the Tasti D-Lite and Planet Smoothie locations will now be run from the Kahala Brands corporate headquarters in Scottsdale, Arizona. In August 2022, Planet Smoothie expanded operations to Australia with 4 locations opening across Victoria within the first 12 months.

== Advertising ==
In 2007, Planet Smoothie decided to send one person on a trip from Orlando to San Diego to assume the role of Cup Man, the chain's longstanding brand character.

The 22-market "Good for You, Good for the Planet" tour took Cupman coast-to-coast in a biodiesel converted ice cream truck designed to raise awareness of green issues in markets across the country.

Candidates were required to submit a video of why they felt they would make the best Cup Man for the 30-day green trek. Joel Moss Levinson, of Dayton, Ohio was named the winner. For Joel's winning entry, he wrote a song with lines such as “I wanna be your Cupman” and “I’m environmentally responsible, I recycle, reduce and reuse, that’s why I want to drive your car that runs on biodiesel fuel.” Joel garnered enough online votes to be chosen as the company's walking, talking, touring CupMan.

Joel has since won 11 contests — earning more than $200,000 in money and prizes. He has been featured in The New York Times, The Jay Leno Show and an Access Hollywood Rising Star.

=== Environmental stewardship ===
In 2008, Planet Smoothie, who served its smoothies in cups made of recycled polystyrene and offered the reusable "MacDaddy" insulated travel mug, sponsored a contest to encourage inventors to develop an eco-friendly solution to polystyrene, currently the only cup material in the marketplace that maintains a smoothie's frozen integrity.

== Merger ==
Following the acquisition of the Planet Smoothie brand by Tasti D-Lite, several stores began to convert to a dual brand product mix, offering both smoothies and soft serve.
