= Kahala Brands =

Franchise fast food restaurant company

- Type: Subsidiary
- Industry: Restaurant
- Headquarters: Scottsdale, Arizona, United States
- Area served: Global
- Key people: Eric Lefebvre (CEO)
- Parent: MTY Food Group (2016–present)
- Website: kahalamgmt.com

Kahala Brands is a wholly owned subsidiary of Canada-based MTY Food Group Inc. of Montreal, Quebec. Based in Scottsdale, Arizona, Kahala is one of North America's largest holding company of franchise fast food restaurant companies. In May 2016, the publicly traded Canadian MTY Food Group announced a friendly takeover deal with the Kahala Brands. MTY agreed to pay about US$300 million to acquire Kahala. The two companies generated nearly $2 billion in revenues in the previous year. Jeff Smit was chosen to lead the US operations of MTY.

== History ==
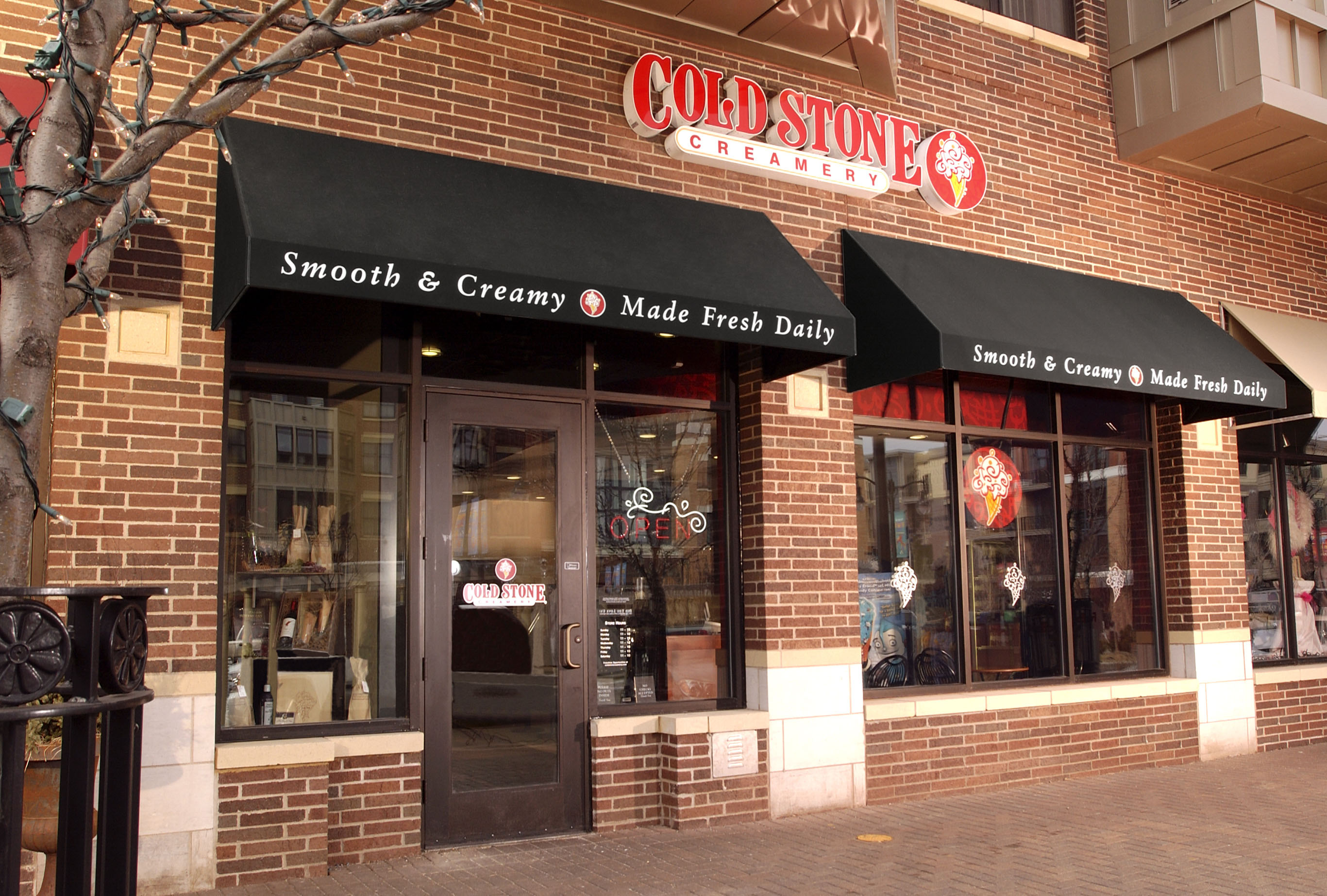
A Cold Stone Creamery location

Surf City Squeeze was started in the early 1980s by Kevin Blackwell and his wife Kathi, and later became a franchise. Later, in 1998/1999, Sports Group International, Inc. (a company that was originally formed to distributed Spalding-branded sports drinks) merged with Surf City Squeeze with Surf City Squeeze's management taking over full control of the company. Also in 1999, Sports Group International purchased Frullati Cafe & Bakery Chain, bringing the total number of its franchised locations to 200.

In 2001, Kevin Blackwell changed the name of his company from Sports Group International to Kahala Corp. after terminating an agreement with Spalding. Also in 2000, Kahala Corp. then developed the Rollerz brand.

From 2002 to 2006, Kahala Corp. purchased Ranch One Grilled Chicken, Samurai Sam's Teriyaki Grill, Taco Time, Great Steak, Johnnie's New York Pizzeria, and Blimpie. Kahala also acquired the license to Wafflo.

In 2007, Kahala Corp and Cold Stone Creamery agreed to merge creating a combined company holding 13 diversified brands. The combined company generated more than $1.1 billion in system wide sales in partnership with 3,000-plus franchisees and more than 4,600 retail locations. As a result of the merger, Kahala's CEO Kevin Blackwell and Cold Stone Creamery's CEO and chairman Doug Ducey were respectively appointed chairman and CEO of the new combined company, Kahala-Cold Stone. Ducey left a few months later to join tech start-up iMemories after being forced out by Blackwell.

In July 2007, Kahala-Cold Stone acquired Cereality Cereal Bar & Cafe.

In 2012, Kahala signed a franchising deal with Phoenix-based America's Taco Shop.

In 2013, a controlling interest in Kahala Corp. was purchased by the Serruya family of Canada. The Serruyas own and founded Yogen Früz, a chain with 1400 stores around the world. At that time, Michael Serruya became Chairman and Co-CEO of Kahala Corp. Shortly thereafter, Co-CEO Kevin Blackwell left the company. The Serruya family changed the company name from Kahala Corp to Kahala Brands to better align the focus of the business.

In June 2015, Kahala Brands purchased Planet Smoothie and Tasti D-Lite. This acquisition added 128 new locations to the overall company store count and increased the total of smoothie-focused locations to over 400 worldwide.

Just a few months later in November 2015, Kahala Brands purchased the gourmet coffee and smoothie brand Maui Wowi. At the time of the acquisition, Maui Wowi had with 400 mobile carts and 29 standalone retail units that operated by 200 franchisees. The following month, Kahala acquired Pinkberry in December.

In July 2016, MTY Food Group Inc. of Montreal, Quebec in Canada purchased Kahala Brands for approximately US$310 million. Under the deal, Kahala remained in its headquarters in Scottsdale, Arizona while MTY's US operations was moved into Kahala's offices. Kahala's Chief Operating Officer Jeff Smit was chosen to lead the US operations of the combined entity.

== Brands ==
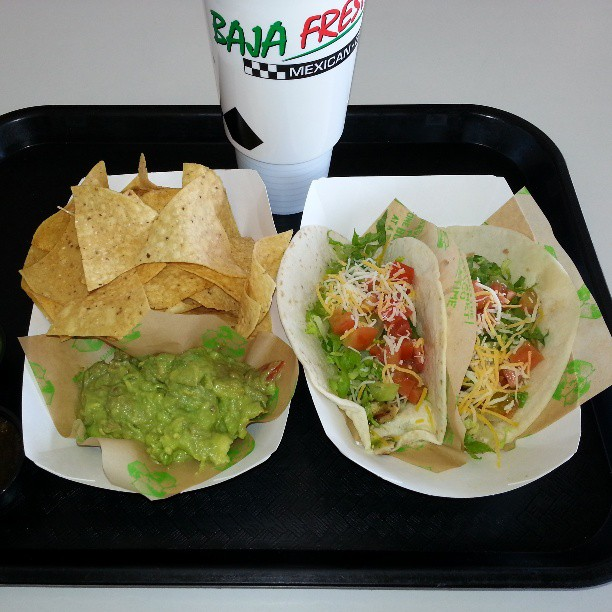
Baja Fresh foods

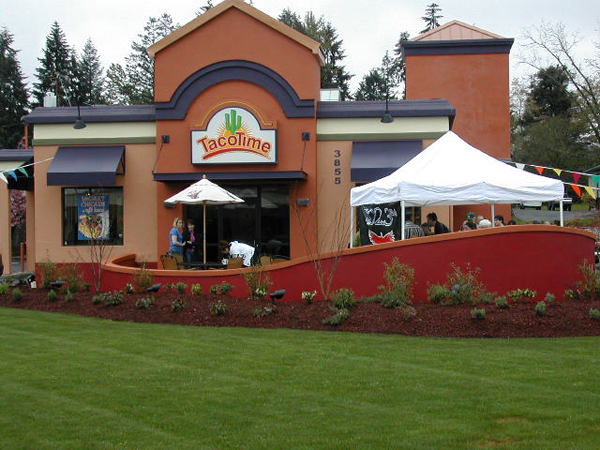
The exterior of a TacoTime restaurant

- America's Taco Shop – a restaurant chain with locations only in Arizona.
- Baja Fresh – a chain of fast-casual Tex Mex restaurants in the United States, Portugal and Kuwait.
- Blimpie – an American submarine sandwich chain with locations in the United States and Kuwait
- Cereality – a chain with stores in Texas, West Virginia, Minnesota and Ohio; also formerly had stores in Illinois.
- Cold Stone Creamery – an ice cream parlor restaurant chain with stores in Bahrain, Canada (partnership with Burger King/Tim Hortons from 2008 to 2014 now terminated), China, Denmark, Egypt, India, Indonesia, Japan, Kuwait, Mexico, Nigeria, Oman, Qatar, South Korea, Taiwan, United Arab Emirates, United States, Philippines, Kenya, Bangladesh, Pakistan, Finland, Jordan, Norway, Saudi Arabia, Sweden, Vietnam, Singapore and Lebanon
- Frullati Cafe & Bakery – chain with stores in Kuwait and the United States.
- Grabbagreen – a chain of restaurants offering healthy foods and smoothies.
- Great Steak – a restaurant chain with locations in Canada, Mexico, Kuwait and the United States. Founded 1982; formerly "Great Steak & Potato Company". In 2000, it had 225 locations. Sold to Kahala Brands in 2004; expansion planned into South Korea.
- Johnnie's New York Pizzeria – restaurant chain with stores in California, Florida, Oregon, and Texas.
- Kahala Coffee Traders (California, Utah)
- La Salsa – a chain of fast-casual Tex Mex restaurants in the United States
- Maui Wowi Hawaiian – chain with stores in the United States, Mexico, Saudi Arabia and the United Arab Emirates.
- NRgize Lifestyle Cafe (United States)
- Planet Smoothie – a chain of smoothie restaurants with stores in Alabama, Arizona, Arkansas, California, Florida, Georgia, Maryland, Massachusetts, Nebraska, New York, North Carolina, Pennsylvania, South Carolina, Texas and Virginia.
- Pinkberry – a chain of frozen dessert restaurants with locations in Canada, Chile, Egypt, India, Indonesia, Japan, Nigeria, Saudi Arabia, Jordan, Panama, Peru, Oman, Qatar, United Arab Emirates, United States, Philippines and Thailand.
- Ranch One – a chain of restaurants specializing in grilled chicken breast sandwiches, with locations in Kuwait and the United States.
- Rollerz (California, D.C., Illinois, Nevada and Texas)
- Samurai Sam's Teriyaki Grill (Kuwait and United States)
- Surf City Squeeze – a chain of smoothie restaurants with stores in Canada, Saudi Arabia, Curaçao/Netherlands Antilles and United States.
- Sweet Frog - a chain of frozen yogurt restaurants with stores in the United States (East Coast, South, Mideast, Midwest, West Coast only) and the Dominican Republic.
- Taco Time (Canada, Kuwait, Curaçao/Netherlands Antilles; and United States, except locations primarily in western Washington state operated by Taco Time Northwest)
- Tasti D-Lite – a New York-based fast food company which mainly sells frozen dessert products, it has locations in Florida, Maryland, Nevada, New Jersey, New York and Texas.
