= Gen Korean BBQ =

American restaurant chain

Gen Restaurant Group, Inc.

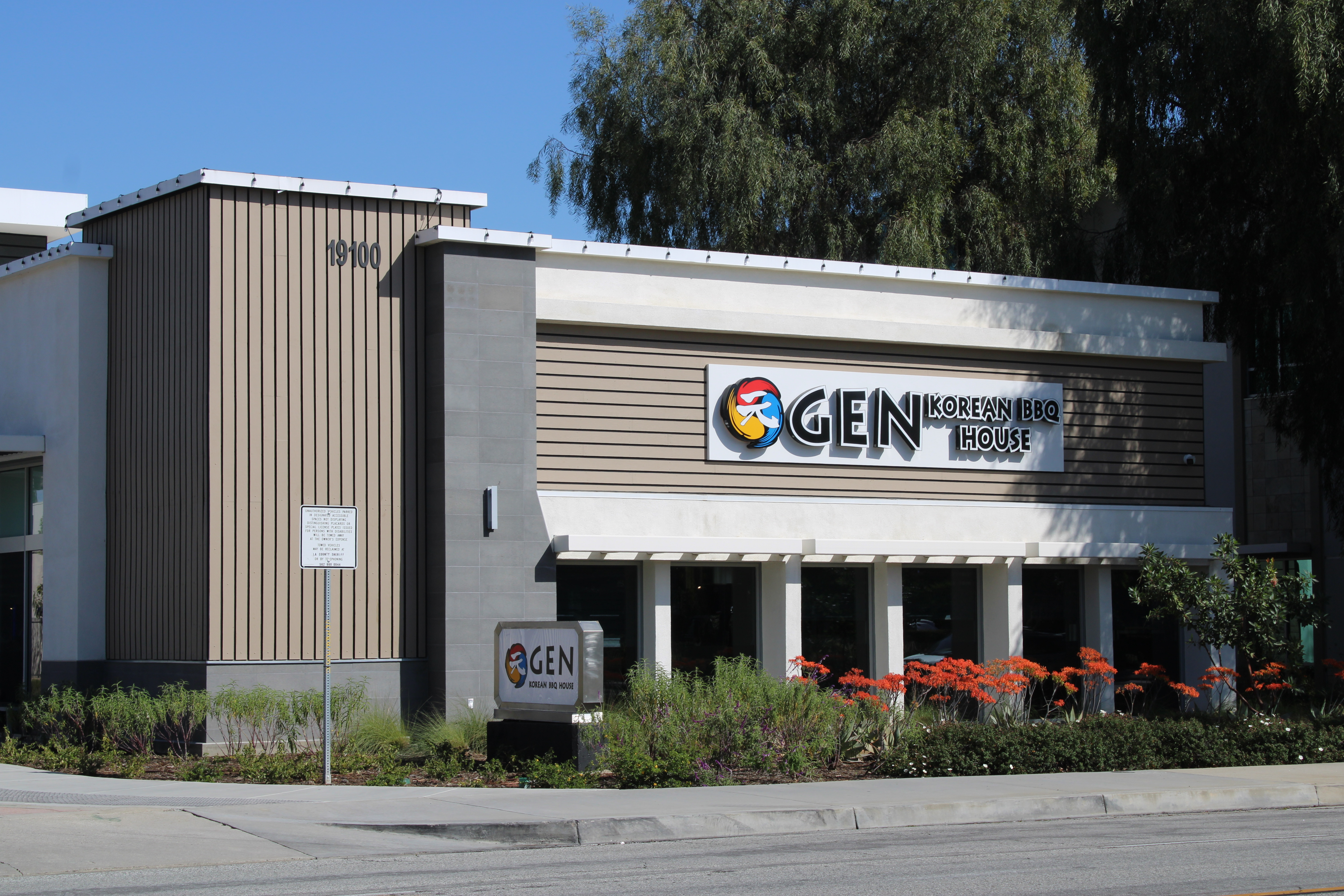
- Location in Cerritos, California
- Trade name: Gen Korean BBQ
- Company type: Public
- Traded as: Nasdaq: GENK
- Industry: Food and drink
- Founded: 2011; 14 years ago
- Founders: David Kim; Jae Chang
- Headquarters: Cerritos, California
- Number of locations: 43 (2024)
- Area served: Western United States; Florida; Hawaii; New York; Philippines
- Key people: David Kim (co-CEO); Jae Chang (co-CEO)
- Revenue: ▲US$163.7M (2022)
- Website: https://www.genkoreanbbq.com/

Gen Korean BBQ is an American chain of all-you-can-eat Korean barbecue restaurants mainly concentrated around the Western U.S. It opened in 2011, and has since grown to 43 locations as of 2024.

== History ==
The restaurant was founded in Los Angeles in 2011, by David Kim and Jae Chang, a pair of Korean immigrants. Kim had previously been the CEO of Baja Fresh and La Salsa. The first restaurant was in Tustin. It gradually expanded through Southern California until 2015, when a location in San Jose in Northern California opened. It also opened its first eatery outside of California in 2015, in Henderson, Nevada. Its first Hawaiian location was opened in the Ala Moana Center in 2016, while the first in Texas opened in Carrollton that same year. In 2016, Gen launched Gen Delivers, a food delivery service that sells ingredients for Korean barbecue online.

In 2017, the company opened a restaurant in Montclair that utilized robots to serve food. This location closed two years later. One other location, formerly in Rowland Heights, opened in 2015 and shut down in 2021.

A restaurant in the Philippines, in the SM Mall of Asia, opened in 2017, becoming the company's first international location. The first location in Arizona was in Phoenix, which also opened in 2017 in Tempe Marketplace. During the COVID-19 pandemic, instead of closing their restaurants, the company converted them into discount meat markets to stay in business. The chain won Silver in "Best Yakiniku/Korean BBQ" in the 2021 Hale Aina Awards. The first location in the Eastern United States was opened in 2022, in Fort Lauderdale, Florida.

A location in New York City opened in January 2023, at the intersection between 14th St and 3rd Ave. Gen went public on the Nasdaq on June 26, 2023, as GENK, raising $43.2 million in its IPO.

== Menu ==
Gen's menu usually has 28-36 items, (Note: During lunch, it has 28 items, but it increases to 36 during dinner.) which include daikon radish paper, sundubu-jjigae, saengchae, japchae, kimchi, potato salad, bulgogi, American Angus and Wagyu beef, gopchang, galbi, shrimp, octopus, yangnyeom chicken, samgyeopsal, and jokbal.

== Locations ==
As of 2024, Gen has 43 restaurants, with 12 upcoming locations. Most restaurants are in California, in the Greater Los Angeles metropolitan area. Although the locations are concentrated around the West, one eatery exists in Florida and New York. Hawaii has three, with one opening in Maui. Other soon-to-be-opened restaurants are in Jacksonville, Florida, Tukwila, Washington, and Dallas, Texas. There is also a restaurant in the Philippines, in the SM Mall of Asia. In Southern California, the restaurant is popular with students from UC Irvine. It plans to open locations in Oregon, Georgia, Virginia, Utah and also in the District of Columbia in the future.
