= David Kim (restaurateur) =

American restaurateur

David Kim is an American businessman and was CEO of Mexican fast food chain Baja Fresh. He was also the CEO of other food brands including Sweet Factory and La Salsa. Kim is no longer associated with any of those brands. He is currently the managing partner of Gen Korean BBQ, listed on nasdaq with symbol GENK. The IPO Launched 6/26/2023.

== Career ==
He appeared in an episode of the CBS series Undercover Boss. On the show he offered a Baja Fresh franchise to an employee.

Kim is now the managing director of Ignite Enterprises whose primary business is consulting with companies and entrepreneurs aiming to help them establish and grow their brands in the US.

== Books ==
- Kim, David, Ignite!: The 12 Values That Fuel Billionaire Success. ISBN 978-0-615-46167-0
