= TacoTime =

American fast food restaurant chain

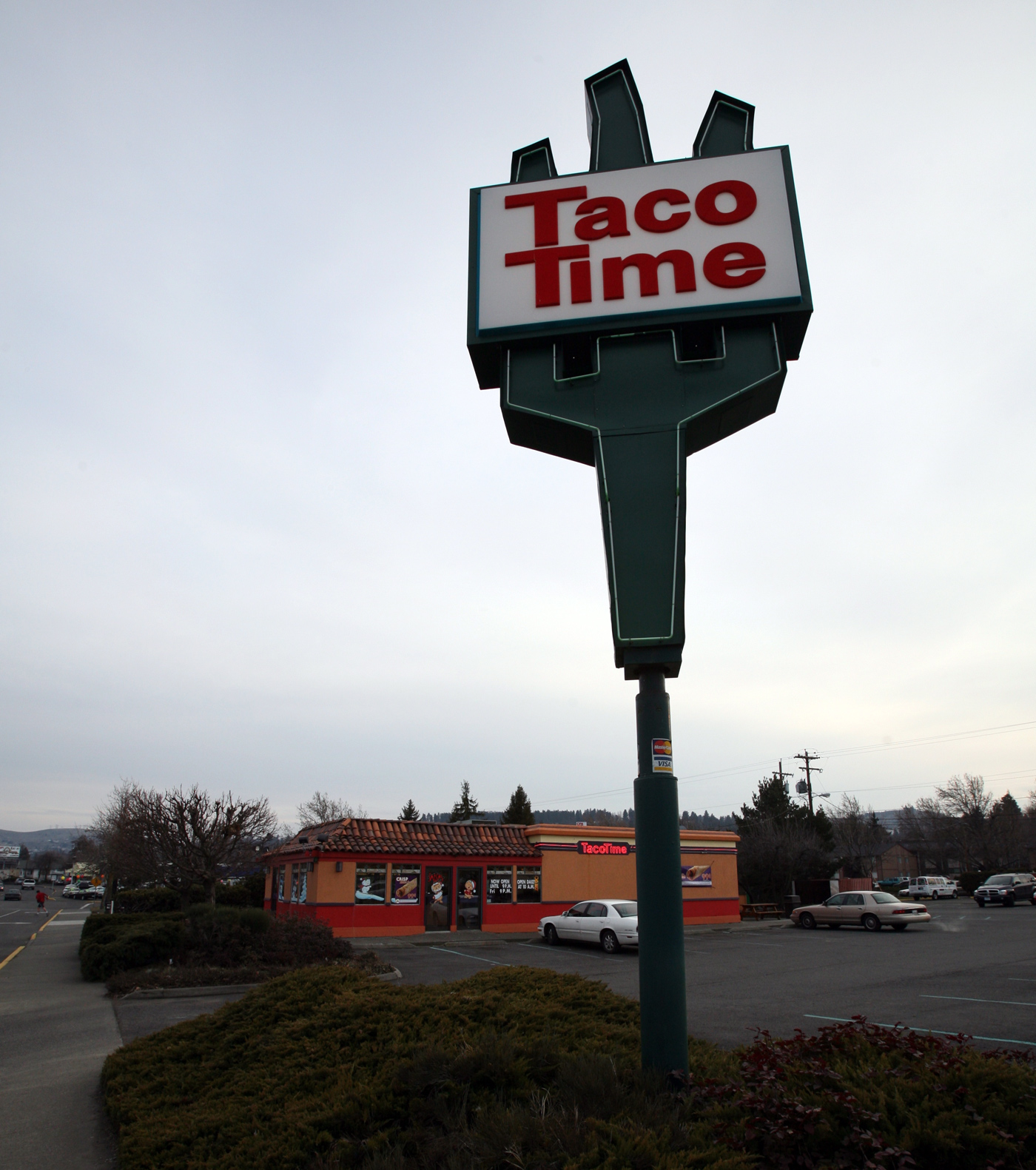
- TacoTime in The Dalles, Oregon
- Type: Private
- Industry: Food
- Founded: January 1960; 66 years ago Eugene, Oregon, U.S.
- Founder: Ron Fraedrick (1928–2015)
- Headquarters: Scottsdale, Arizona, U.S. (2003)
- Number of locations: Over 300 (2010)
- Area served: United States; Canada
- Key people: Kevin Gingrich (Brand President)
- Products: Tacos, burritos, and other Tex-Mex cuisine-related fast food
- Owner: MTY Food Group
- Parent: Kahala Brands
- Website: tacotime.com

Taco Time (stylized as TacoTime) is an American fast-food restaurant chain specializing in Mexican-American food. The chain has over 226 locations in the United States and 74 locations in Western Canada. It was founded in Eugene, Oregon, in 1960 by Ron Fraedrick.

== History ==
The chain was founded in Eugene by Ron Fraedrick (1928–2015), who opened the first restaurant near his alma mater, the University of Oregon, at 13th Avenue and High Street in January 1960.

In 1962, the first Taco Time franchise opened in White Center, Washington. In the 1970s, the company expanded to 48 restaurants in seven Western states. In 1978, the company franchised its first international restaurant in Lethbridge, Alberta, Canada.

In 1979, Taco Time Northwest became a licensee with the rights to franchise and operate the Taco Time concept independently. Taco Time Northwest's operating region includes western Washington from Longview to the Canada–United States border and the eastern Washington cities of Wenatchee and Moses Lake.

In 1984, food at a location in The Dalles was allegedly poisoned by members of the Rajneesh movement in a bioterror attack.

Taco Time has since expanded, now holding more than 300 franchises in the United States and Canada. They previously had locations in Kuwait, Greece, and Netherlands Antilles (Curaçao) which seem to have closed.

In 2003, the company was bought by Kahala Brands of Scottsdale, Arizona.
