= Chase Crawford =

American actor, producer, and entrepreneur (born 1996)

Chase A. Crawford
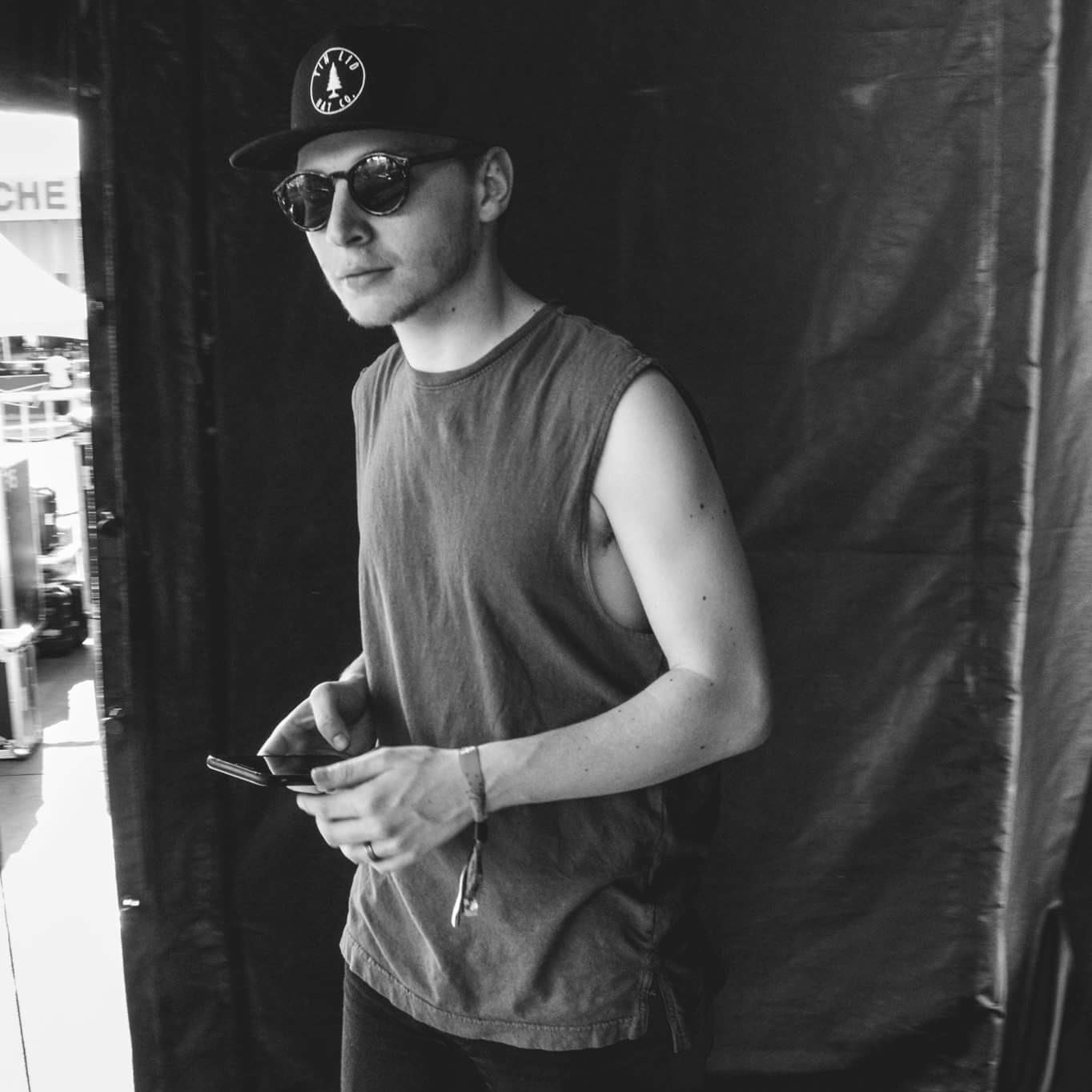
- Chase Crawford at Breakaway Music Festival (2016)
- Born: Chase Alexander Crawford; March 11, 1996 (age 30); New Bern, North Carolina, United States
- Occupations: Actor, Producer
- Years active: 2013–present
- Spouse: Alexandra Crawford
- Children: 3
- Parents: Ray Crawford (father); Susan Crawford (mother)
- Website: fourbythreeproductions.com

Chase Alexander Crawford (March 11, 1996) is an American actor, film producer and entrepreneur from Monroe, Ohio. He is best known for founding Four by Three.

== Early life ==
Crawford was born in New Bern, North Carolina, to Susan and Ray Crawford. He attended and graduated from Monroe High School and D Russel Lee Career-Technology Center (a Butler Tech school) in 2014. He landed his first commercial role in August 2013 and graduated high school early to focus on his acting career.

== Career ==
=== 2015–2019 ===
After appearing in the 2016 Sundance Film Festival selection Goat alongside James Franco and Nick Jonas, he appeared in 2016 Toronto International Film Festival selection In the Radiant City.

In 2016, he played in various films including Joel Moss Levinson's Boy Band alongside Questlove, Steve Agee, Jerry O'Connell and Gilbert Gottfried, and the film adaption of the Newbery Medal award-winning book Walk Two Moons, which was renamed to The Marriage Bed.

Crawford produced Life Backstage, a show that offered an inside look of artists such as Waka Flocka Flame, Cheat Codes and Louis the Child. Following the success of Life Backstage, Crawford produced his first feature film, Alan and the Fullness of Time, alongside childhood friend Markus Cook in 2017.

In 2018, Crawford went on to produce Cooper Flannigan's musical comedy Moondance in Kalamazoo, Michigan. He also appeared in a handful of films including Johnny Chechitelli's Worst. Christmas. Ever and Andrew Paul Davis' Palace.

Crawford launched his podcast, According to the Internet, in June 2018. The podcast debuted at No. 186 in the Apple Podcasts Top 200. The format of the show is described as "pop culture banter" and each episode features a different guest.

In 2019, he served as a producer on the psychological thriller The Clearing, documentary feature The Land Beyond and Zach Daulton's Looking Back. The actor and producer also ventured into directing working on music videos with Cal Scruby and "Rhythm + Flow" alum Caleb Colossus.

=== 2020–present ===
In early 2020, Crawford and his company executive produced Joe Chrest's dark comedy The Cran. The film was shot in and around Bowling Green, Ohio.

March 13, 2020 marked Crawford's first theatrical release as he saw Moondance release in 18 cities. Due to the coronavirus pandemic, several theatres had to cancel screenings, leading the producer to pen an article for Medium titled "I produced the lowest-earning new release film in the worst box office week in 20 years… A Recap". The article went viral and was a top post on Reddit and several other message boards.

Crawford rounded out 2020 leading production on Michael Pomeroy's debut comedy The Rest of Your Life and TV documentary A Polo Legacy, which follows Chicago businessman James Drury and the Oak Brook Polo Club.

In early 2021, it was announced that Crawford's company Four by Three had acquired distribution rights to How We Lookin?, a documentary about the life of Hall of Fame broadcaster Marty Brennaman. The documentary premiered on American Broadcasting Company and features interviews with Pete Rose, Nick Lachey, Urban Meyer and Kirk Herbstreit

In December 2021, Chase Crawford was named to the Forbes Next 1000 list.

Crawford signed on to Co-Executive Produce Miguel Faus's debut feature The Quiet Maid in February 2022. The project went on to become the first European film funded by NFTs and received finishing funds from Steven Soderbergh.

In the Summer of 2022, Crawford produced the feature film Between Mercy and Me in Cincinnati, Ohio starring Andrea Summer and David Driskell. The film debuted nationwide in the United States on June 20, 2023.

Crawford executive produced 34 stand-up comedy specials in 2022 including Ryan Goldsher's Many People, Chase O'Donnell's People Pleaser and Papp Johnson's Timeless. People Pleaser was described as "enjoyable YouTube content" by Jason Zinoman of the New York Times and later named to the publication's list of Best YouTube Comedy Specials released in 2023. People Pleaser was named one of the Top 10 Comedy Albums of 2023 by NPR and Timeless was recognized by Paste Magazine as one of the Top 20 Comedy Albums in 2023.

In 2023, Crawford executive produced 46 stand-up comedy specials including Rajiv Satyal's All Over the Place and Luke Null's Pretty Songs Dirty Words, which features Wayne Brady.

In February 2024, Crawford directed Tony Rock's Untitled Comedy Special in Raleigh, North Carolina.

Crawford was named to Forbes 30 Under 30 list in July 2024.

In 2025, he was voted Best Local Filmmaker by Cincinnati CityBeat and inducted into the International Indie Filmmaking Hall of Fame, which was recognized by United States Congressman Thomas Massie in the Congressional Record.

== Other work ==
Crawford pursued modeling for a brief period of time, landing a Times Square billboard for H&M in November, 2014. He has also appeared in ad campaigns for Uber, Taco Bell, Acura and Samsung.

Crawford served on the Advisory Board for BLINK Cincinnati in 2022.

== Personal life ==
Crawford married his high school sweetheart, Alexandra, shortly after the two began taking classes at Miami University. The two eventually transferred and graduated from the University of Cincinnati. The couple lives in Fort Thomas, Kentucky, just outside of Cincinnati, and they have three daughters, Cambrie, Carter and Cobi.

Crawford was named a Kentucky Colonel by Governor Andy Beshear on February 21, 2025.
