= In the Radiant City =

2016 film

- Official release poster
- Directed by: Rachel Lambert
- Written by: Rachel Lambert; Nathan Gregorski
- Produced by: Jeff Nichols
- Starring: Michael Abbott Jr.
- Cinematography: Zoë White
- Edited by: Julia Bloch
- Music by: West Dylan Thordson
- Distributed by: The Orchard
- Release dates: September 11, 2016 (TIFF); July 18, 2017 (United States)
- Running time: 95 minutes
- Country: United States
- Language: English

In the Radiant City is a 2016 American drama film directed by Rachel Lambert in her feature directorial debut, and written by Lambert and Nathan Gregorski. The film follows a man who, after testifying against his brother, returns to his rural Kentucky hometown twenty years later to face his fractured family.

In the Radiant City premiered in the Discovery section at the 2016 Toronto International Film Festival on September 11, 2016, and was digitally released in the United States on July 18, 2017.

== Cast ==
- Michael Abbott Jr. as Andrew Yurley
- Marin Ireland as Laura Yurley
- Madisen Beaty as Beth Yurley
- Celia Weston as Susan Yurley
- Jon Michael Hill as Richard Gonzalez
- Chase Crawford as Corey's Friend
- Deirdre O'Connell as Woman
- Paul Sparks as Michael Yurley
