= Joel Moss Levinson =

American writer and comedian

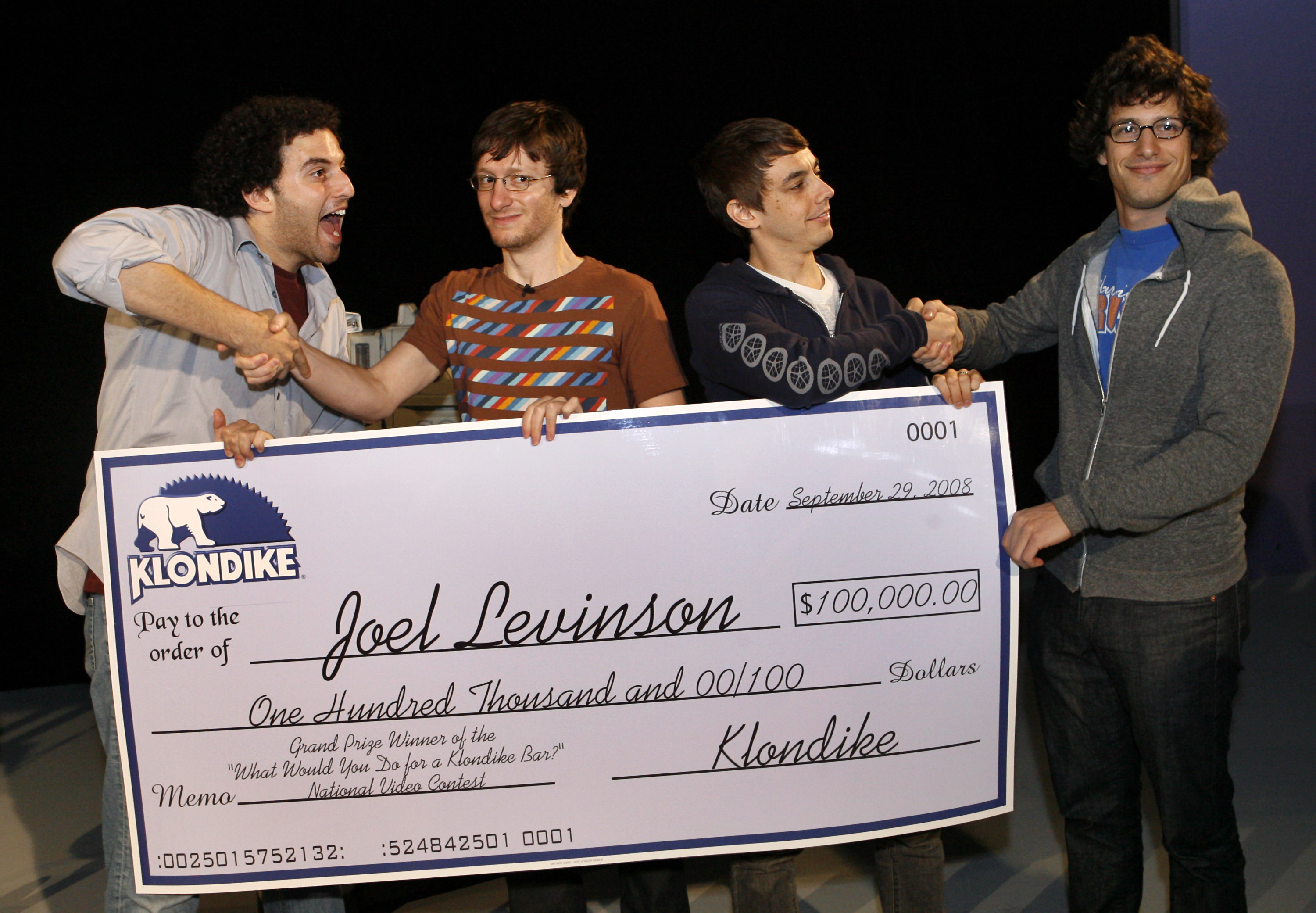
- Levinson receives a giant promotional check from the Lonely Island
- Born: 1979 or 1980 (age 46–47); Dayton, Ohio
- Occupations: Comedian, Video Producer, Musician
- Website: joelmosslevinson.com

Joel Moss Levinson is a writer and comedian from Yellow Springs, Ohio. He often collaborates with his older brother, Stephen Levinson, as the Levinson Brothers.

Joel gained national attention in 2008 as an Internet personality who professionally wins consumer generated marketing contests, and earned more than money and prizes, by creating corporate jingles and short commercials.

== Career ==
Along with their third partner, CONAN and former Daily Show writer Rob Kutner, the Levinson Brothers released "2776" a comedy/musical album benefitting the charity OneKid OneWorld. Featuring Aimee Mann, Patton Oswalt, Ed Helms, Ashanti, Reggie Watts, Ira Glass, Nina Totenberg, Will Forte, Rebirth Brass Band, Yo La Tengo, Margaret Cho, Neko Case, Kelly Hogan, Dick Cavett, Dick Gregory, k.d. lang, Will Arnett, Alex Trebek and more, the album appeared briefly on the Billboard Comedy charts. The album's liner notes were written by George Saunders and appeared in the New Yorker Joel composed the music for all but two of the 28 tracks.

In 2012, the Levinson Brothers and Rob Kutner released an EP called "It's OK To Do Stuff" in celebration of the 40th anniversary of "Free To Be You And Me." Made up of songs satirizing the original with songs about gender, childhood, equality and relationships. "It's Okay to Do Stuff is first and foremost meant to be funny — and it is, most of the time. Here, the earnestness of Free to Be is replaced with satire, but irony is the ethos of our age, remember?" The album features Lizzy Caplan, Fred Willard, Jane Weidlin, Steven Page, Colin Hanks, Fred Stoller, Eddie Pepitone, Eugene Mirman and others.

In 2016 the Levinson Brothers wrote and produced a musical comedy called "Boy Band," the story of a late 1990s Boy Band who were wildly successful but have now gotten older, fatter and balder and haven't realized they are no longer "boys." The movie features Questlove, Chase Crawford, Gilbert Gottfried and stars Steve Agee, Jordan Carlos, Dave Hill, Seth Herzog and was primarily filmed in and around Dayton, Ohio. The movie was the subject of a Newsweek article about making comedy features outside of Los Angeles.

The pair were a part of TedX Dayton 2014, speaking about successful collaboration.

=== Internet ===
Joel gained national attention in 2008 as an Internet personality who professionally wins consumer generated marketing contests, and earned more than money and prizes, by creating corporate jingles and short commercials.

Levinson grew up in Dayton, Ohio. His father Jim was a prosecutor and his mother was a writer. He attended George Washington University. He worked for the KIO (Kentucky, Indiana, Ohio) region for BBYO and traveled the country as a song leader for the organization.

In November 2008, he appeared on The Tonight Show to talk about his contest winnings. Joel was named an Access Hollywood Rising Star on December 1, 2008. In 2009 he appeared on CBS News with Katie Couric.

In 2018, Levinson won a trip to Kenya with Lifestraw, completing his goal of winning a trip to every continent through video contests.

In 2022, Levinson competed on Jeopardy, and delighted the audience with his humorous answering style, becoming something of a meme online.

== Contests won ==
- Planet Smoothie Cupman
- Klondike bar
- Little Penguin Wines
- Best Western
- Delta Air Lines
- American National CattleWomen
- Israel Project
- Thanksgivvukah for Manischewitz

== See also ==
- Evelyn Ryan
