= Consumer-generated advertising =

Type of advertising

Consumer-generated advertising is advertising on consumer generated media. This term is generally used to refer to sponsored content on blogs, wikis, forums, social networking services, and individual websites. This sponsored content is also known as sponsored posts, paid posts, or sponsored reviews. The content includes links that point to the home page or specific product pages of the website of the sponsor. Examples include Diet Coke and Mentos videos, the "Crush on Obama" video, and Star Wars fan films. Companies that have employed consumer-generated ads include Subaru North America, McDonald's, Rose Parade, and Toyota North America.

The practice of consumer-generated marketing has been in use for several years with the emergence of communal forms of information sharing including weblogs, online message boards, podcasts, interactive broadband TV, and other new media that has been adopted by consumers at the grassroots level to establish community forums for discussing their customer experiences.

Consumer-generated marketing is not the same as viral marketing or word of mouth advertising; however, the result of it achieves a high level of publicity within high relevance communities. These communities are extremely critical to the success of a brand, and normally follow the 80/20 rule, where 20% of the brand's customers account for 80% of its sales. The very act of reaching out to consumers to invite them in as co-collaborators and co-creatives, is a fundamental component of the marketing campaign. The construct naturally lends itself to other consumer-marketing activities, like "communal branding" and "communal research."

== Sponsored posts ==
Sponsored posts have been defined as the promoted entries or posts which contain links that point to a webpage or specific product pages of the website of the sponsor for which the creator of the content receives compensation in the form of money, products, services or in other ways. As opposed to the graphical ads (in the form of banners or buttons), which have been around on websites for quite some time, the sponsored content may be in the form of feedback, reviews, opinion, videos or other content. Forrester Research uses the term sponsored conversation which refers to sponsored conversation which involves payment to bloggers and other consumers who generate the advertising, to create transparent and genuine content about the brand.

== Communal marketing ==
Communal marketing refers to a marketing practice that incorporates public involvement in the development of an advertising/marketing campaign. Such a campaign invites consumers to share their ideas or express their articulation of what the brand means to them through their own personal stories, with the use of print media, film or audio. The resulting consumer-generated content is then incorporated into the campaign. Finally, the result of this collaboration is showcased, often in a cross-media campaign, to invite the extended community of like-minded individuals to share in the results, thereby creating a communal bond between the "brand champions as advertisers" and other individuals who have a natural affinity with what the brand has to offer. The result provides the brand with a way to create a deeper connection with their core market, while also opening up new pathways to extend the relationship to new customers.

Anytime a brand reaches out to its audience to invite them to be co-collaborators in the development of an advertising campaign, they are participating in a "communal branding" effort. Whenever marketing decisions are the result of communing with the brand's audience to help drive the development of a campaign, they are engaging in "communal research." For example, Peter Jackson, in the making of The Lord of the Rings, reached out to loyal followers of the book to help weigh in on some major directorial decisions.

== Customer rewards ==
Joel Moss Levinson won 11 consumer generated marketing contests, and earned more than $200,000 in money and prizes, by creating corporate jingles and short commercials.

Customer Loyalty

Customer Loyalty can be defined as the outcome of consistently positive emotional experience, physical attribute-based satisfaction and perceived value of an experience, that also includes products or services. Customer loyalty can also be related to customer experience management as it blends the physical, emotional and value elements of an experience into one unified experience. Maintaining faithful customers costs a company less money than acquiring new ones. Customer experience management is one of the most cost-effective ways to drive customer satisfaction, customer retention and customer loyalty. Customer loyalty is important to a business because loyal customers generally ensure sales and are more likely to purchase high-margin supplemental products and services. Loyal customers also help organizations reduce costs linked with consumer education and marketing, especially when loyal customers become the company's net promoters. Customer experience programs are one of the most effective ways to differentiate an organization from its competitors. This level of differentiation effectively drives customer loyalty when customers are involved on an emotional, intellectual or spiritual level.

Customer loyalty schemes are an effective way to improve an organization's customer retention levels and profitability. To build a loyal clientele, organizations need to recognize and reward their best customers. Loyalty schemes can be used by companies to incentivise and satisfy valued customers which in turn can help businesses improve their customer base and also their profitability. An organization's loyalty programs allows them to focus on loyal customers and improve satisfaction levels. Faithful customers tend to purchase more products and are often willing to pay more than the usual price, which in turn can boost an organization's cash flow. Increased loyalty from customers also extends the time that they place their business with the company, meaning they will stick to the business more often and in an extended period.

Customer loyalty schemes also help companies improve their triple bottom line through the data collected during the course of the customer loyalty schemes. It also helps companies to identify customer behaviour and focus on them to come up with strategies that may help organizations reward their loyal customers. Customer loyalty schemes can also be used to gain back the attention of customers who are turning away from the business. The data generated by a loyalty scheme can offer other helpful information. It can help point out defection patterns from customers and also help organizations improve their product range and stock selection.
