= Baja Fresh =

American Tex-Mex restaurant chain

- Logo of Baja Fresh since late 2017

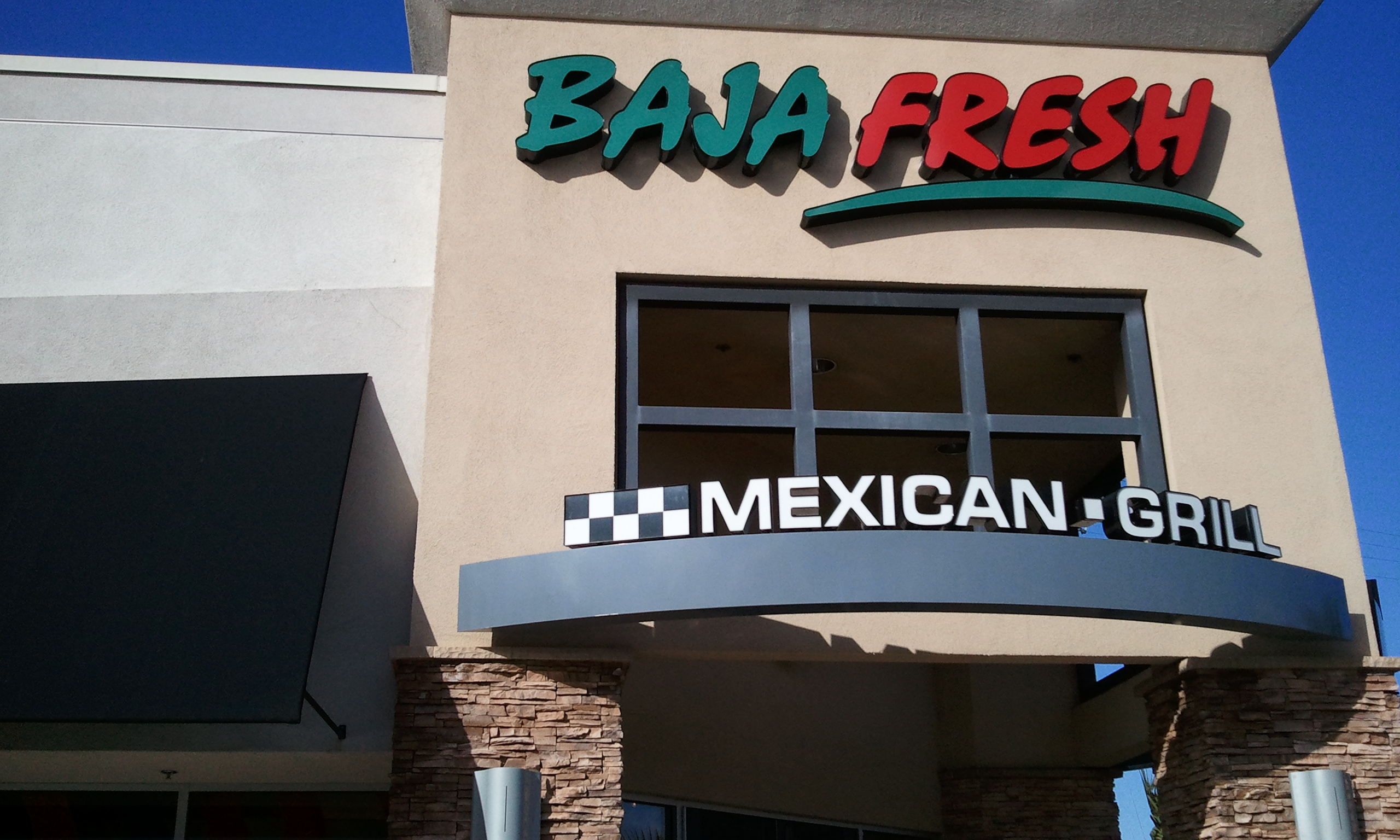
- A Baja Fresh restaurant in San Carlos, California, in December 2010
- Type: Subsidiary
- Industry: Restaurant franchising
- Founded: August 1990; 36 years ago Newbury Park, California, U.S.
- Founder: Jim Magglos and Linda Magglos
- Headquarters: Scottsdale, Arizona, U.S. (2016–present)
- Number of locations: 70
- Area served: United States; Portugal
- Key people: Eric Lefebvre
- Products: Mexican-style fast casual food
- Owner: Kahala Brands
- Parent: MTY Food Group
- Website: www.bajafresh.com

Baja Fresh is an American chain of fast-casual Tex-Mex restaurants founded in Newbury Park, California, in 1990 and headquartered in Scottsdale, Arizona. It is owned by Canadian franchisor MTY Food Group. The chain emphasizes fresh ingredients, each restaurant featuring a self-serve salsa bar.

At the time of its acquisition by MTY in 2016, the chain operated 162 restaurants in the United States, Dubai, and Singapore, most of which are franchised.

== History ==
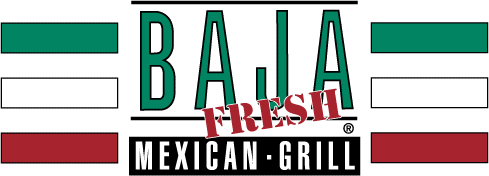
Baja Fresh's former logo, used from 1990 until 1997

Baja Fresh's former logo, used from 1997 to 2010

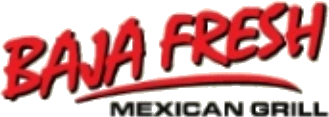
Baja Fresh's former logo, used from 2010 to 2012

Baja Fresh's former logo, used from 2012 to 2017

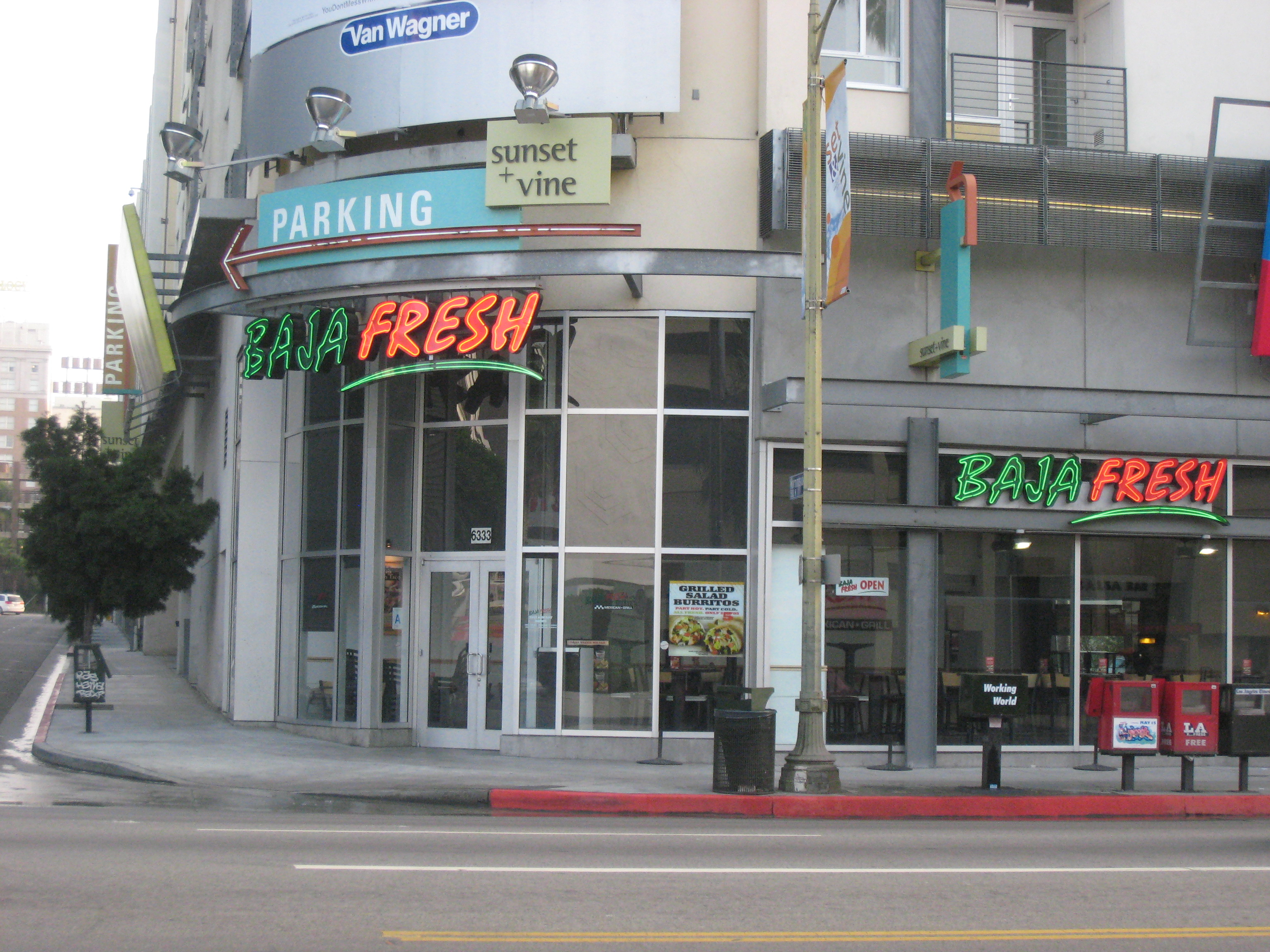
A Baja Fresh restaurant on Sunset Boulevard in Hollywood, California, in 2008

=== 1990s ===
In 1990, Jim and Linda Magglos took out a third mortgage on their home and opened the first Baja Fresh in Newbury Park, California in the Conejo Valley. Franchising began in 1995, and the chain had expanded to 31 outlets by 1997. In 1998, the Magglos worked with Greg Dollarhyde and Pete Siracusa, who recapitalized the parent company, acquired venture capital and bought shares from outside holders to take control of Baja Fresh. Dollarhyde became CEO with Siracusa as chairman and Magglos as president, they then grew the chain from 45 locations in 1998 to 249 stores.

=== 2000s ===
In 2002, Wendy's International purchased Baja Fresh for $275 million. As a wholly owned subsidiary of Wendy's, the 249 restaurant chain saw consistently declining same-store sales. In 2006, Wendy's sold the roughly 300-location Baja Fresh chain for $31 million to BF Acquisition Holdings, a private investor consortium that had operated franchised restaurant units for such chains as Sweet Factory, Cinnabon, and Denny's. At the time of the firm's acquisition by BF Acquisition Holdings in 2006, Baja Fresh had 144 company-owned and 154 franchised locations in the states of Arizona, California, Colorado, Connecticut, Florida, Idaho, Illinois, Indiana, Maryland, Massachusetts, Michigan, Nevada, New Jersey, New York, Ohio, Oregon, Pennsylvania, Tennessee, Texas, Virginia, Washington as well as the District of Columbia. The consortium was led by David Kim, who took on the role of CEO, and later appeared on Season 2 episode 20 of the reality TV series Undercover Boss.

In 2009, Baja Fresh moved its corporate headquarters from Thousand Oaks to Cypress, California, and closed all locations in central Ohio.

=== 2010s ===
Between 2009 and 2010, the chain closed stores in Berkeley, Pasadena and Torrance, California. When the chain opened its first international location in Dubai in 2010, the chain also had 255 restaurants in 28 U.S. states.

In late 2011, the company moved its main corporate office from Cypress to Irvine. In early 2012, the chain closed its store in Newbury Park, California, although this was a different location in Newbury Park than the original site of the first Baja Fresh.

On April 5, 2012, David Kim stepped down from his position as company CEO. His position was assumed by company president Chuck Rink, who began to hold both titles.

All five Phoenix-area locations were closed by a franchise operator without notice in mid-April 2013.

In September 2016, it was announced that Baja Fresh's parent, BF Acquisition Holdings, was sold to MTY Food Group for $27 million. At the time of the acquisition by MTY, Baja Fresh had 162 restaurants and its sister company La Salsa had 23 restaurants with 16 of the combined 185 locations were franchised. It is unclear if the new owner would combine the two chains or keep them separate. In an earlier press release announcing MTY's acquisition of Kahala Brands just two months previously, MTY gave the vague statement that "Kahala will stay in Kahala's current headquarters... while MTY's US operations will move into Kahala's offices". This statement could imply that Baja Fresh might become a subsidiary of Kahala instead of just sharing space with Kahala and reporting directly to MTY corporate headquarters in Canada. Published newspaper reports are not very clear about the exact relationship between Kahala and MTY units in the United States.

=== 2020s ===
As of late September 2024, Baja Fresh had 80 locations, 78 in the United States and 2 international ones. The majority are located along the western Coast of the United States.

== International expansion ==
The first location outside of the United States was open inside the Dubai Mall in Dubai in the United Arab Emirates in 2010 by franchise owner Vetra Investments. By the end of 2011, two additional locations were opened in Dubai at the Mall of the Emirates and Deira City Centre plus another location in Sharjah by the same franchisee. A fifth UAE location was opened at Mirdiff City Centre in Dubai in 2014. By the end of 2015, the lone location in Sharjah and the locations at the Dubai Mall and the Deira City Centre in Dubai were closed and replaced by a new location in the Yas Mall in Dubai. In August 2016, Vetra opened a food truck in Dubai. By 2019, Vetra had quietly abandoned its Baja Fresh UAE website and there is no news when the franchisee had finally closed all of its Baja Fresh restaurants in the Dubai.

The first location in East Asia opened in Singapore in 2012 by franchisee Gloria Foods Pte. Ltd. A second location in Singapore was opened in 2015. Both Singapore locations were quietly closed by 2021 when their website became inactive.

The chain came to Portugal in 2020.

== La Salsa ==
La Salsa has been a subsidiary of Baja Fresh since 2007 when La Salsa was acquired from CKE Restaurants. Similar to Baja Fresh, La Salsa is a chain of fast-casual Tex Mex restaurants that has locations throughout the United States with most of the restaurants located in Southern California. Since its acquisition, the company had always shared corporate headquarters offices with Baja Fresh.

== See also ==
- List of Tex-Mex restaurants
