= Surf City Squeeze =

Chain of smoothie restaurants

Surf City Squeeze logo

Surf City Squeeze is a chain of smoothies and restaurants, which is franchised by Kahala Brands of Scottsdale, Arizona. The chain was founded in Phoenix, Arizona in 1981 by Kevin Blackwell. As of 2010 Surf City Squeeze has more than 100 franchise locations operating in Canada, Saudi Arabia, Curaçao/Netherlands Antilles and United States.
