= Taco Time Northwest =

Taco restaurant chain in the United States

- Industry: Fast food
- Founded: 1962; 63 years ago in White Center, Washington
- Founder: Frank Tonkin, Sr.
- Headquarters: 3401 Lind Avenue SW; Renton, Washington
- Area served: Western Washington, Wenatchee, Washington, and East Wenatchee, Washington
- Website: tacotimenw.com

Taco Time Northwest is a fast-food restaurant chain with over 70 locations in western and central Washington state.

== History ==
The first Taco Time opened in Eugene, Oregon in January 1960 and expanded to Tacoma, Washington. In 1962, Frank Tonkin Sr., opened a location in White Center.

In 1979, the Tonkin family's restaurants became independent of the parent company, leading to the establishment of Accord Inc. to franchise restaurants in western Washington. The Taco Time restaurants located in eastern Washington (other than those in Wenatchee & East Wenatchee) and Oregon remained with the original corporation. By 2001, Taco Time Northwest had 73 locations—of which 43 were franchised—and employed 1,500 people.

== Locations ==
Taco Time Northwest has 79 restaurants located across Western Washington, primarily centered in the Seattle metropolitan area, and two restaurants located in Eastern Washington. From 2012 to 2016, the company also operated a food truck called the Taco Time Traveler, which offered a limited menu at Downtown Seattle stops during the weekday lunch hour and catered community and private events on the weekend.

The chain's location in the Wallingford neighborhood of Seattle had a distinct reflective glass façade that was installed in 1990. The store closed in July 2024.
