= Saengchae =

Korean salad

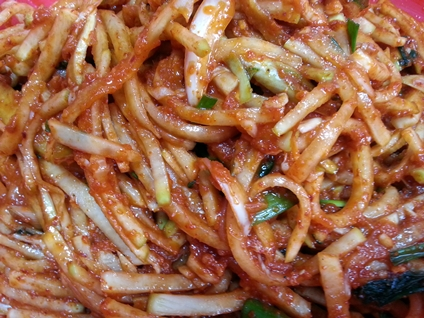
Saengchae

Saengchae (Korean: 생채) is a kind of Korean salad generally consisting of uncooked mixed seasonal vegetables such as radishes and other ingredients such as chicken or jellyfish.

There are many types of saengchae depending on ingredients. For example, cucumber saengchae and radish saengchae are made by mixing them with gochujang (red pepper paste) sauce. Mustard may also be used. Generally, Koreans eat saengchae with rice but saengchae is considered to be a well-matched food for other dishes, including meat, bibimbap and noodles.
