= Cold Stone Creamery =

American ice cream chain

Cold Stone Creamery, Inc.

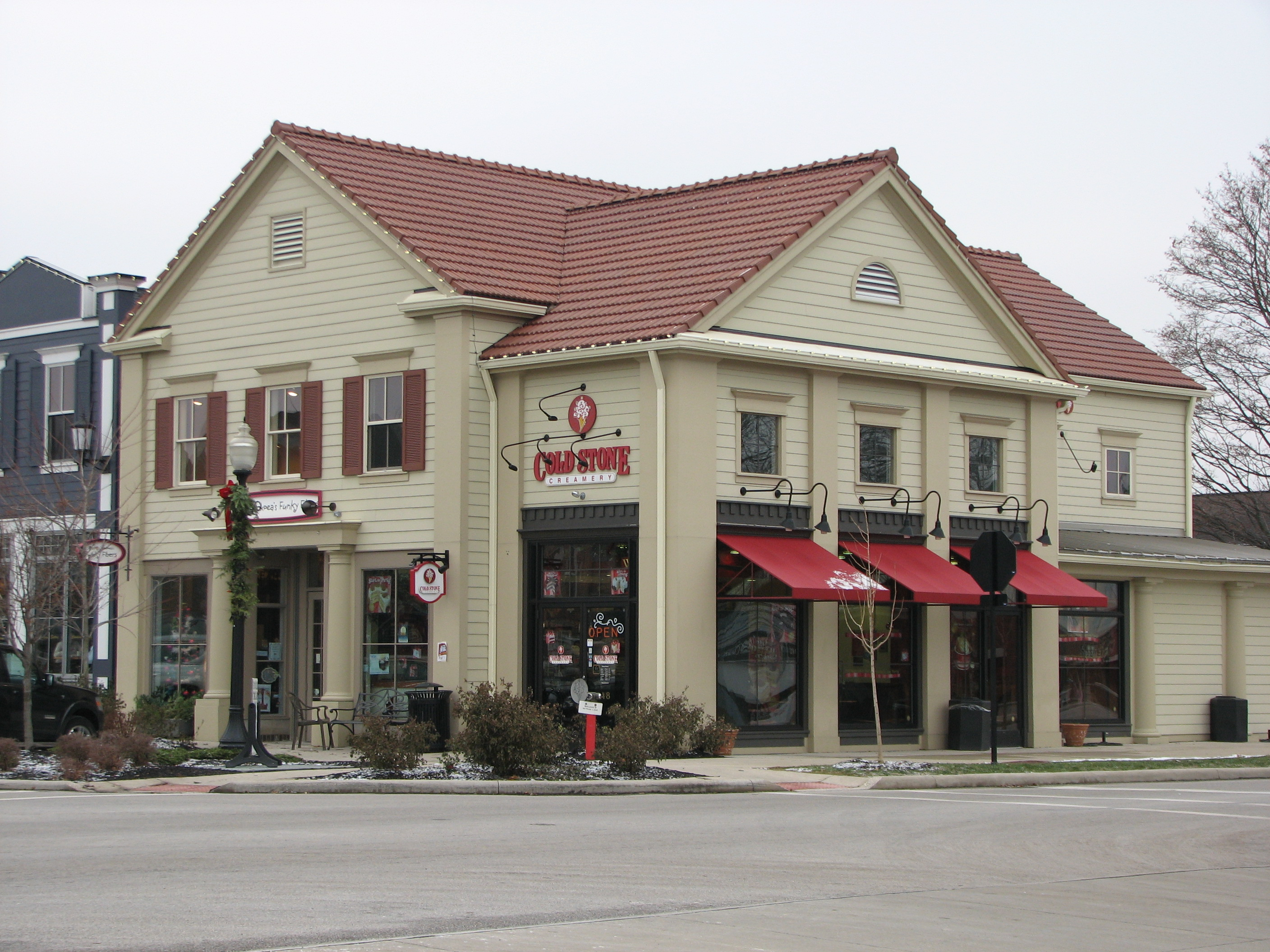
- Cold Stone Creamery in Hudson, Ohio.
- Type: Wholly owned subsidiary
- Industry: Ice cream parlor Franchising
- Founded: 1988; 38 years ago in Tempe, Arizona
- Founders: Donald Sutherland; Susan Sutherland
- Headquarters: Scottsdale, Arizona, U.S.
- Number of locations: 929 (US domestic, 2022)
- Areas served: Full list: United States; Bahrain; Burkina Faso; Cambodia; Cameroon; Democratic Republic of the Congo; Djibouti; Egypt; Ethiopia; Guam; India; Indonesia; Iraq; Japan; Kenya; Kuwait; Lebanon; Malaysia; Mali; Morocco; Nigeria; Oman; Pakistan; Philippines; Qatar; Saudi Arabia; Somaliland; Taiwan; Thailand; Turkey; United Arab Emirates; United Kingdom; Uzbekistan
- Key people: Éric Lefebvre (CEO - MTY)
- Products: Ice cream; Ice cream cakes; Sorbet
- Parent: Kahala Brands (through MTY Food Group (2007–present)
- Website: coldstonecreamery.com

Cold Stone Creamery, Inc. is an American international ice cream parlor chain. Headquartered in Scottsdale, Arizona, the company is owned and operated by Kahala Brands. The company's main product is premium ice cream made with approximately 12–14% butterfat, made on location and customized for patrons at the time of order. Cold Stone has also expanded its menu with other ice cream-related products, including: ice cream cakes, pies, cookie sandwiches, smoothies, shakes, and iced or blended coffee drinks.

== History ==
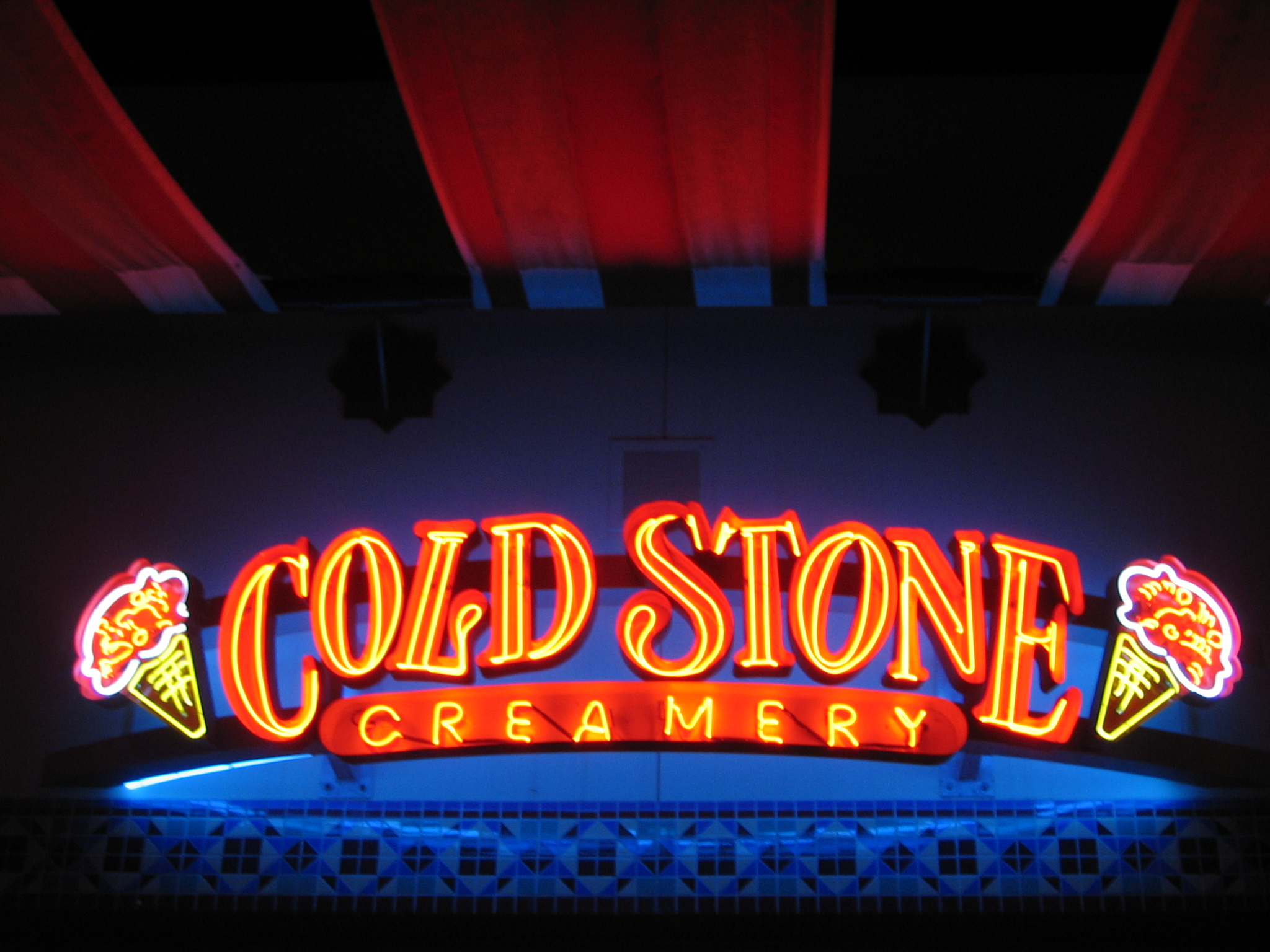
A neon sign for the Cold Stone Creamery at Irvine Spectrum in Irvine, California

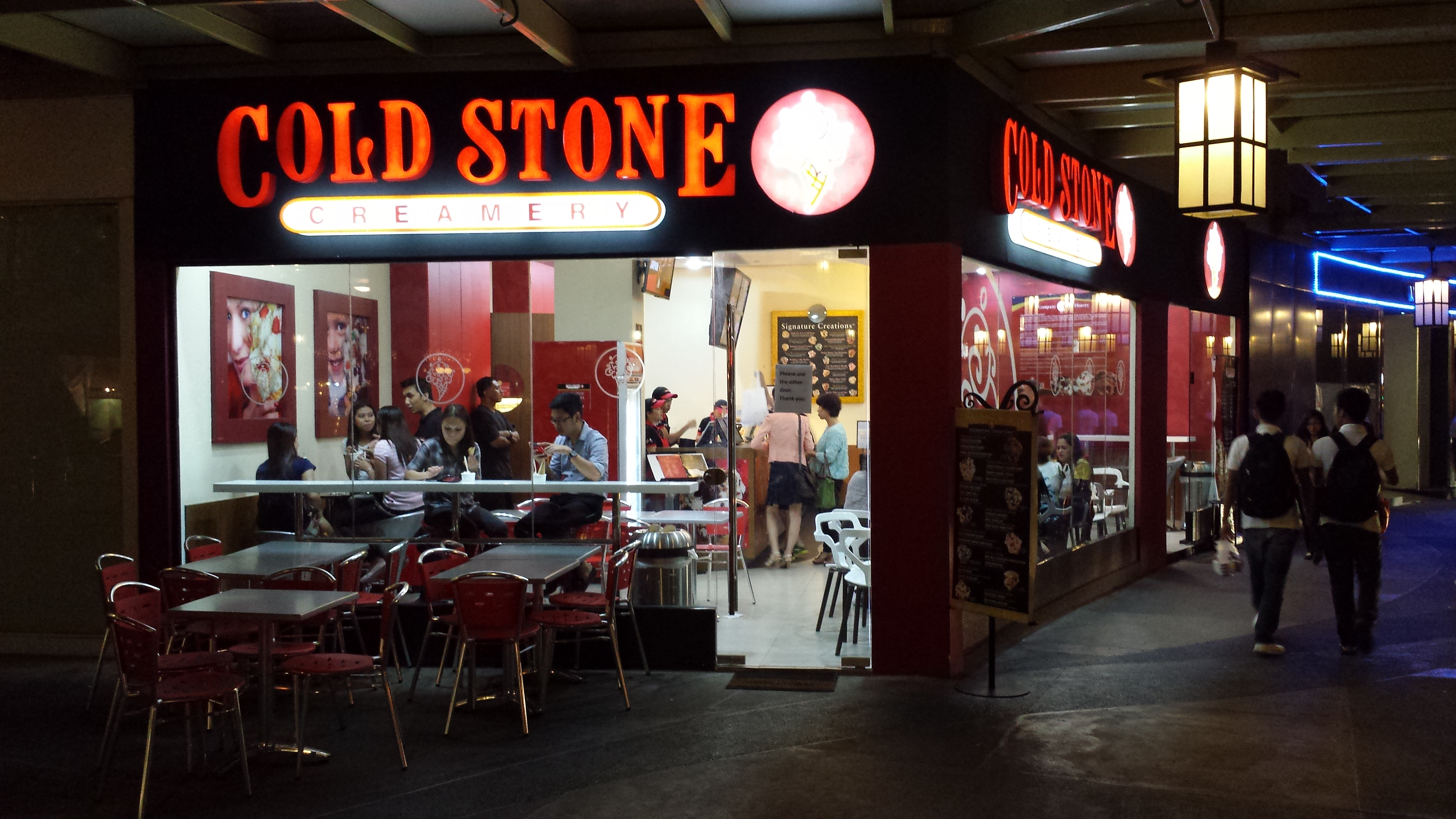
Cold Stone Creamery at Serendra Plaza in Taguig, Philippines

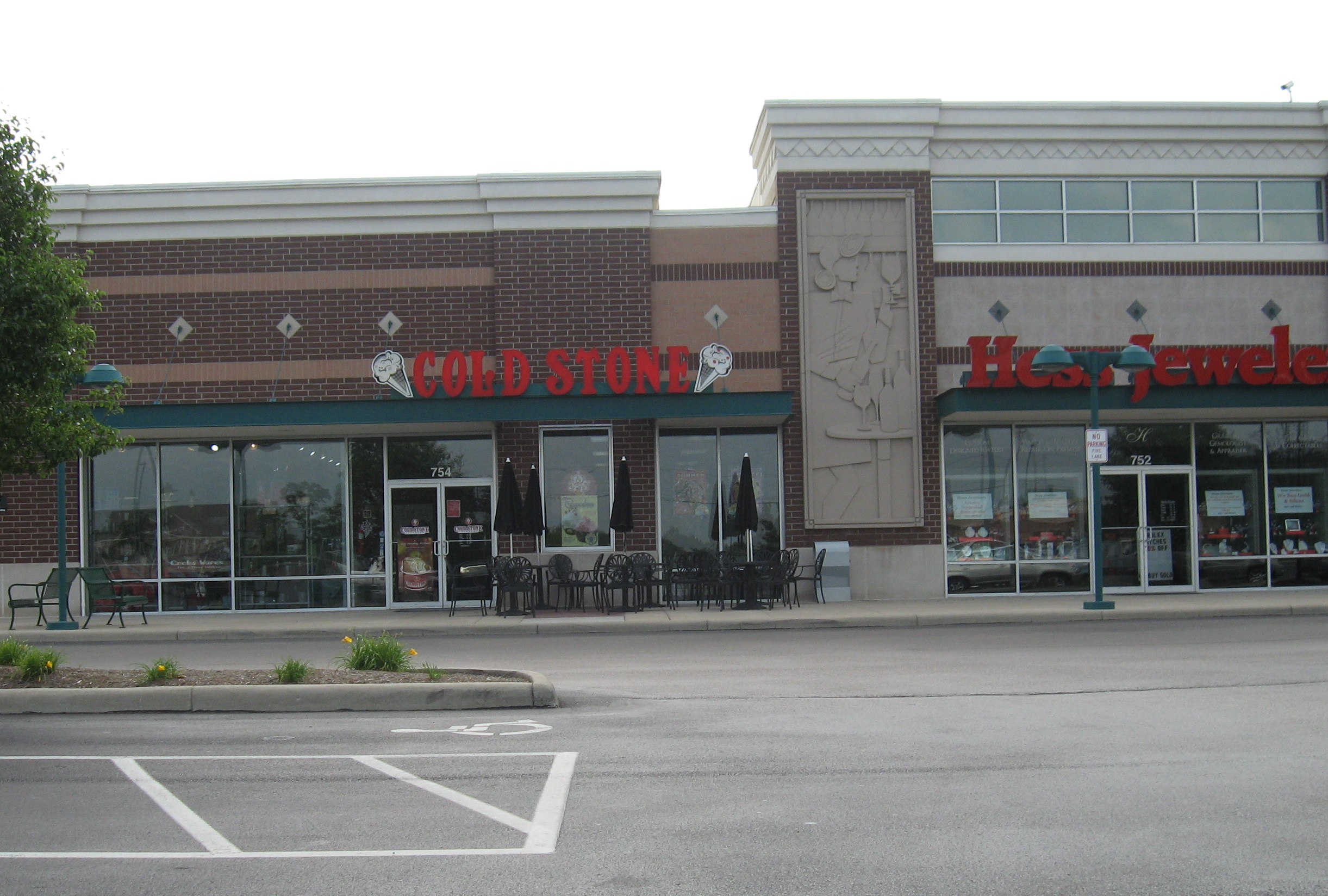
Cold Stone Creamery in Springboro, Ohio

The company was co-founded in 1988 by Donald and Susan Sutherland, who sought ice cream that was neither hard packed nor soft-serve. Cold Stone Creamery opened its first store that year in Tempe, Arizona. The original Cold Stone Creamery, store #0001, remains in operation near the same intersection at the southwest corner of McClintock and Southern in Tempe. The store moved from the original location to this location in the early 1990s.

The company has maintained the same concept created by Steve Herrell, who founded Steve's Ice Cream. Patrons select a flavor of ice cream and then choose a number of mix-ins to be added to the ice cream. Mix-ins include candies, nuts, brownies and syrups. Cold Stone derives its name from the frozen granite slab that employees use to fold mix-ins into the ice cream.

In 1995, Cold Stone Creamery opened its first franchise store in Tempe, Arizona. Shortly after, a second location was opened, in Camarillo, California. Cold Stone Creamery has become the sixth best-selling brand of ice cream in the US. In 2008, Cold Stone opened its first European franchise in Copenhagen, Denmark. Three more stores were later opened in other parts of the country. In January 2006, the company was named the 11th fastest-growing franchise by Entrepreneur magazine. In June 2009, the company opened its first locations in Canada. As of 2012, three stores had opened in Singapore. In 2012, Cold Stone opened its first store in Nigeria, the first in Sub-Saharan Africa. On January 3, 2020, Cold Stone Creamery announced that it would close its doors on January 31, 2020, in Singapore. In March 2015, Cold Stone opened its first location in Turkey's capital Ankara. In 2015 Cold Stone Creamery opened its first location in El Salvador in Multiplaza Mall and in April 2023, Cold Stone opened its first United Kingdom location in Charing Cross Road.

In May 2007, Cold Stone Creamery merged with Kahala Corp to form Kahala-Cold Stone, which collectively owns 8 brands. Doug Ducey, who had served as president and CEO of Cold Stone Creamery since 1995, and future Governor of Arizona, was named CEO of the new company. Kevin Blackwell, the former CEO of Kahala, became chairman of the board and chief strategist. However, in September 2007, Ducey announced he was leaving the company. Blackwell was named CEO. In 2013, the Serruya family, based in Toronto, Ontario, purchased a majority interest in Kahala and changed the name to Kahala Brands to better align with the focus of the business.

After a decade of operation, Cold Stone Creamery closed all its outlets in Singapore on January 31, 2020.

=== Co-Branding ===
Cold Stone franchisees in New York City began partnering with Soup Kitchen International to sell soup in their stores beginning in late 2007. In 2008, the company signed a master agreement with the Rocky Mountain Chocolate Factory to open licensed locations carrying that company's products.

==== Tim Hortons ====
The parent company of Cold Stone Creamery, Kahala Brands, announced in February 2009 that it had reached an agreement with Canadian coffee shop chain Tim Hortons to open 100 co-branded stores in the United States after successfully testing two locations in Rhode Island. The strategic alliance was intended to pave the way for Tim Hortons to operate in more US locations while allowing Cold Stone Creamery to expand into Canada. The most notable co-branded store opened in August 2009 when Tim Hortons moved into three Cold Stone Creamery locations in New York City, including its flagship Times Square location.

In June 2009, Cold Stone Creamery started testing the Canadian market by opening seven co-branded locations with Tim Hortons in Toronto, Oakville, Mississauga, Hamilton, Pickering, Sudbury, and Halifax, Nova Scotia. They had locations in every Canadian province except for Newfoundland and Labrador.

The Tim Hortons venture followed on the footsteps of a similar co-branding efforts in 2007 and 2008, but ended in 2014.

== Products ==
There are four serving sizes. Cold Stone Creamery offers ice cream in several serving sizes, including Like It, Love It, and Gotta Have It. Customers can choose from different ice cream flavors and customize their orders with mix-ins. Also offered are milkshakes and smoothies, among them the Cold Stone PB&C; Its large size was designated by Men's Health Magazine as the most unhealthy drink in the United States for two consecutive years. The drink has 2,010 calories, 131 grams of fat with 68 grams saturated fat, and 153 grams of sugar.

Cold Stone Creamery: Scoop It Up, a simulation video game developed by CyberPlanet Interactive and published by Zoo Games, was released for the Wii in 2009.

=== Licensing ===
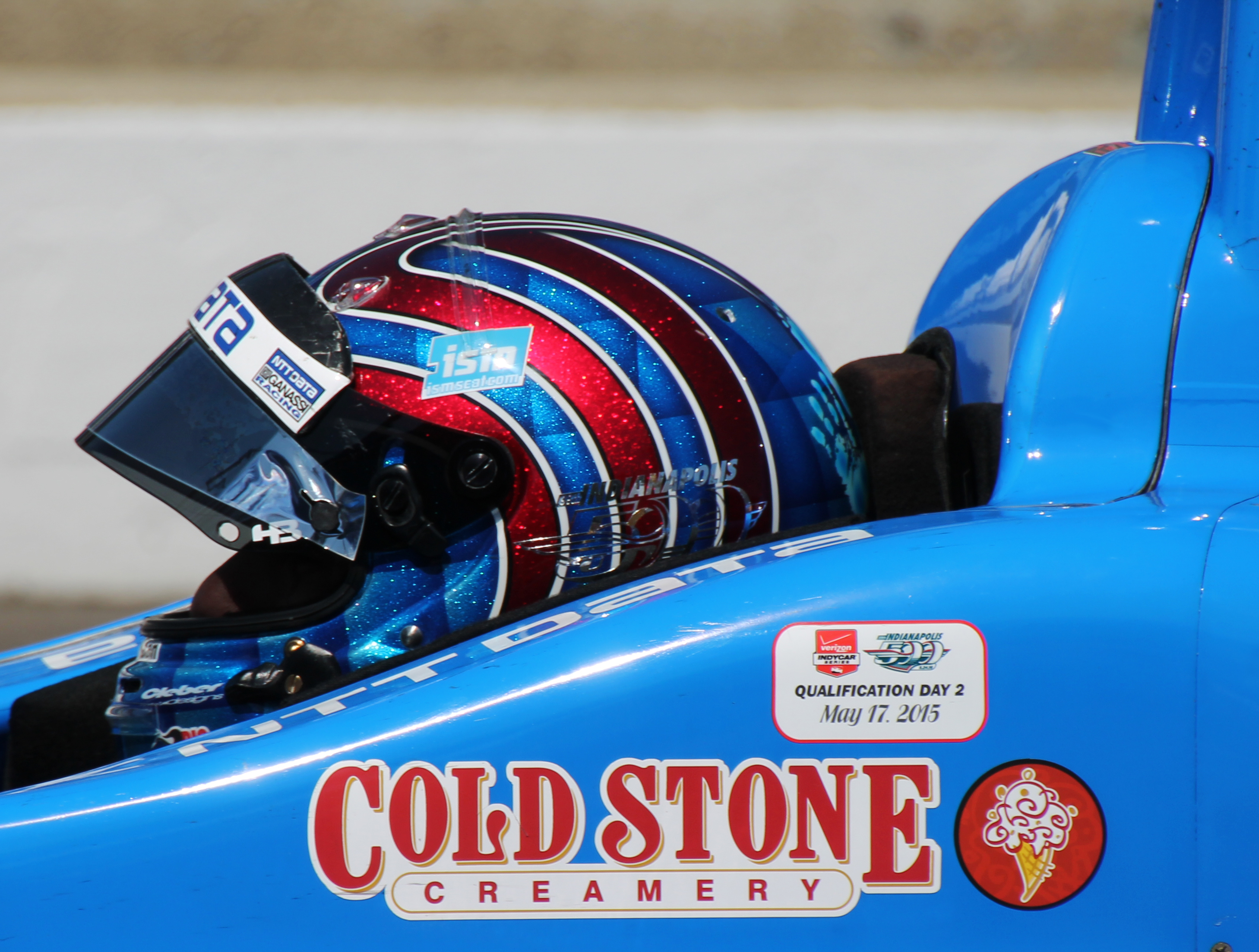
Cold Stone Creamery sponsored Tony Kanaan's 2015 #10 IndyCar

Cold Stone has entered into partnerships with other companies to promote brand name products inside its stores. The first major partnership the company entered into was with Kraft Foods for its Jell-O brand in 2009. Cold Stone introduced a series of flavors of ice cream based on popular Jell-O pudding flavors; Chocolate, Butterscotch, Banana, and Vanilla. Because the pudding additives cause the ice cream to gel, it was recently noted that these flavors do not melt.

Externally, a 2008 licensing agreement with Jelly Belly had a line of jelly beans flavored like some of Cold Stone's most popular ice cream flavors.

== Legal issues ==
There have been allegations by independent franchises that Cold Stone's business practices have put them at a competitive disadvantage. These former franchises claim that the parent company opens locations too close to each other, requires expensive remodeling and overstates potential revenues and income. Other franchises have contended that is not the case and that they are experiencing growth amid financial uncertainties and higher costs associated with fuel and energy prices.

In June 2008, The Wall Street Journal examined the issue. The article stated that a large number of locations, approximately 16–20%, of Cold Stone Creamery franchises have closed or were put up for sale by their owners, many of whom had suffered significant financial losses due to their investment. The article included claims by franchisees that the company had misrepresented the average revenues of Cold Stone stores and acted in ways that reduced stores' profit margins. A company spokeswoman said that the number of stores for sale was "at par with industry expectations" in light of "the economically challenging times."

=== CNBC documentary and lawsuit ===
In December 2010 lawyers from Cold Stone Creamery threatened a lawsuit over some of the contents of a then-upcoming documentary by CNBC.

Behind the Counter: The Untold Story of Franchising reported on the failures and successes of franchising. After several edits the program was broadcast on CNBC on March 21, 2011. Brands such as Dunkin' Donuts and Five Guys were highlighted as successful franchise brands. Cold Stone Creamery's executives and corporate lawyers were interviewed. The lawsuit was discussed with former franchisees and the litigation threats with CNBC. An apparently successful Cold Stone franchise was also featured. Another expose was not aired due to threats of litigation and stores that were closed for years appeared on search engines for some unknown reason.

== Safety issues ==
=== Food safety ===
In 2015, the Food and Drug Administration alerted the public that products containing "cake batter" ice cream sold at Cold Stone Creamery stores may be associated with an outbreak of [salmonella] infection in several states. In response, Cold Stone Creamery has agreed to immediately remove all "cake batter" ice cream products from its stores throughout the US.

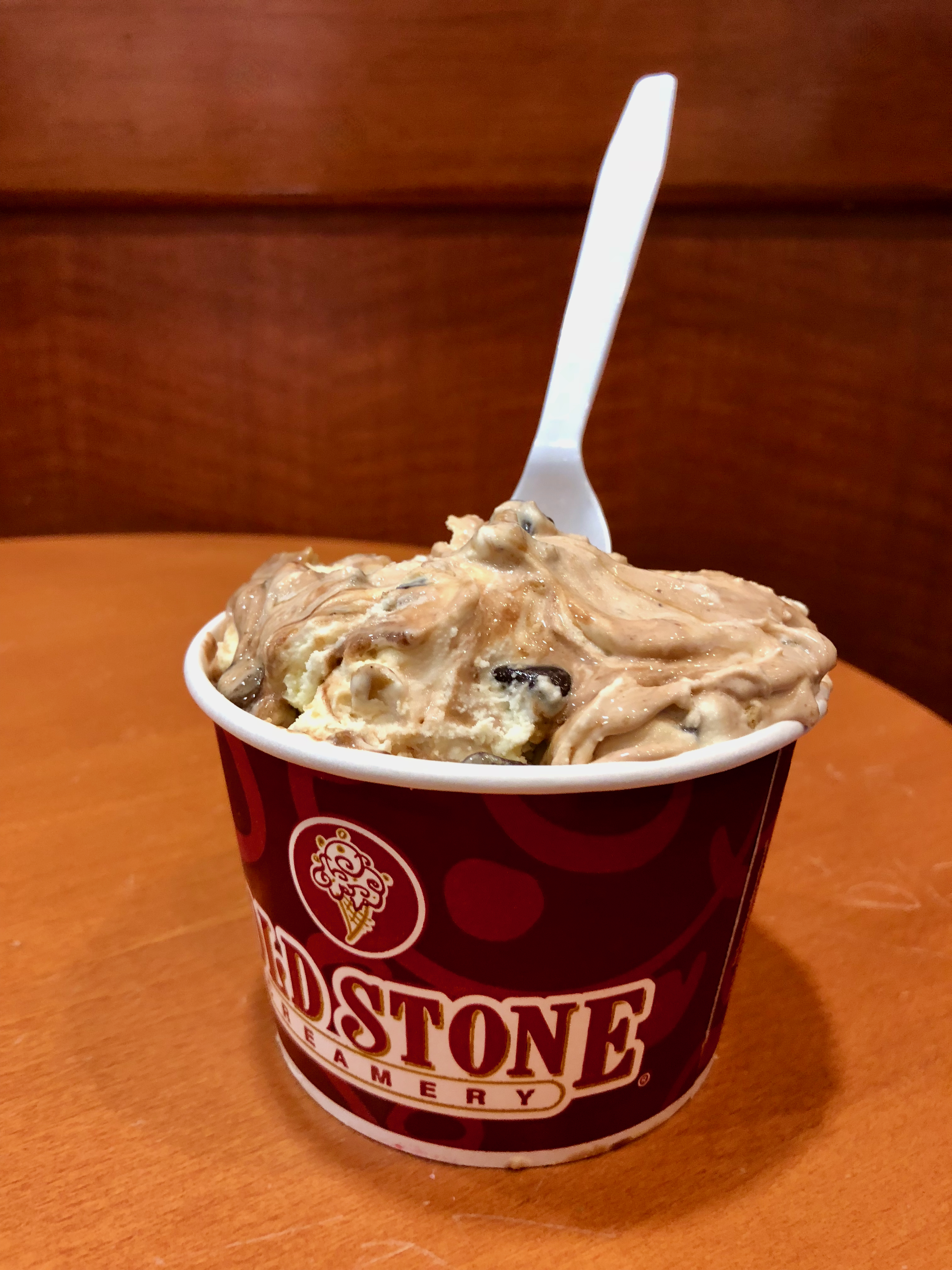
Ice cream served at a Cold Stone Creamery

Ten years earlier, in 2005, the Minnesota Department of Health notified the federal Centers for Disease Control and Prevention (CDC) that four cases of Salmonella typhimurium (S. typhimurium) with an indistinguishable pulsed-field gel electrophoresis (PFGE) subtype (CDC PulseNet pattern JPXX01.1173) had been identified. The only common exposure among the four ill individuals was that all had eaten at one of two Cold Stone Creamery stores. All cases had eaten cake batter flavor ice cream in the week before the onset of symptoms. After a thorough investigation, 25 cases were identified in nine states (Minnesota, Oregon, Washington, Virginia, Ohio, California, Illinois, Massachusetts, Michigan, and Pennsylvania); 24 reported eating cake batter ice cream from Cold Stone Creamery.

=== Workplace safety ===
In 2023, an Oregon employee lost three fingers when the rotors of an ice cream machine pulled the towel she was using and her hand into the machine's blades. In response, the employees reportedly immediately quit their jobs.

In a similar incident in 2007, also involving a rag and an ice cream machine, an employee lost one finger.

== Corporate headquarters ==
While the company was originally headquartered in Tempe, in 1997 the company moved its headquarters to Scottsdale, Arizona. In July 2005 Cold Stone moved into its current headquarters. The two-story building has classroom space, a product development laboratory kitchen, and a training store.
