= Blimpie =

American submarine sandwich chain

Blimpie International, Inc.
- Blimpie logo since 2014
- Trade name: Blimpie
- Type: Subsidiary
- Industry: Restaurants Franchising
- Genre: Fast food
- Founded: May 16, 1964; 62 years ago in Hoboken, New Jersey, U.S.
- Founders: Angelo Baldassare; Tony Conza; Peter DeCarlo
- Headquarters: 9311 East Via De Ventura Boulevard; Scottsdale, Arizona 85258, United States
- Number of locations: 91
- Area served: United States; Kuwait(ceased operations)
- Products: Submarine sandwiches Salads; Other food products
- Revenue: ▲$63 million (November 2020)
- Number of employees: About 1,000
- Parent: Kahala Brands
- Website: blimpie.com

Blimpie International, Inc. is an American submarine sandwich chain based in Scottsdale, Arizona. It was founded in Hoboken, New Jersey, in 1964, by three friends, and has since endured three ownership changes.

== History ==
=== 1960s–mid-1970s ===
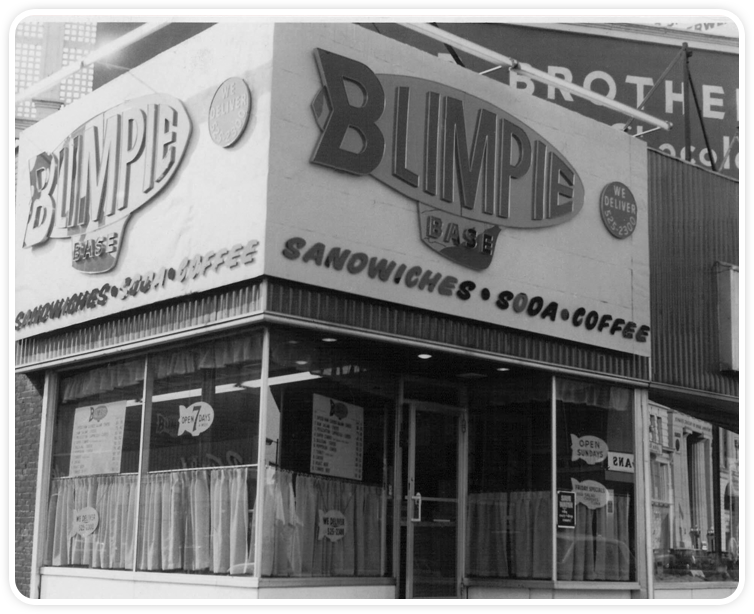
Blimpie restaurant c. 1964 in Hoboken, New Jersey.

The first Blimpie sub shop was opened on May 16, 1964, in Hoboken by Tony Conza, Peter DeCarlo, and Angelo Baldassare, former high school friends and classmates at Saint Peter's Prep in Jersey City. Inspired by the successful Point Pleasant operation Mike's Submarines (later Jersey Mike's Subs), the three speculated that a similar restaurant would do well in Hoboken. The store's name came about because Tony Conza preferred not to call the sandwiches subs, which he felt sounded like a greasy spoon. Conza preferred the term hoagies, but Hoboken residents were unfamiliar with the Philadelphia term. He scanned a dictionary until he found "Blimp", a word that sounded to him most like a sandwich.

=== Late 1970s–1989 ===
Conza felt that there was little potential in submarine sandwiches, and in 1984 opened Border Café, a tablecloth restaurant serving southwestern cuisine on Manhattan's Upper East Side. Although the Border Café did reasonably well at first, this shift in focus did not do the company much good. While Conza was turning his attention away from subs, competitor Subway, which was founded a year after the first Blimpie's was opened, was beginning an expansion drive that pushed it far ahead of Blimpie as the world's foremost submarine sandwich chain.

After the Border Café's initial success, Conza opened two more of them in 1986, one in Woodstock, New York, and the other on the Upper West Side of Manhattan. However, the Border Café idea was a money loser. Despite $4.5 million in revenues for 1987 (its largest total yet), the company showed a net loss of $347,800 for the year. That year, only 30 new Blimpie restaurants were opened, and company stock was in free fall, bottoming out as low as 15 cents per share. Conza's interest in his core business began to return. Over the next couple of years, Atlanta became the company's biggest target for new Blimpie's franchises. In 1987, the company celebrated the opening of the 50th Blimpie's store in the Atlanta area by giving away 25,000 free sandwiches to customers there.

Blimpie launched a quality-control program aimed at cleaning up its 140 New York restaurants, which had long been subpar.

In 1989, Blimpie began testing a new low-calorie menu.

=== 1990–present ===
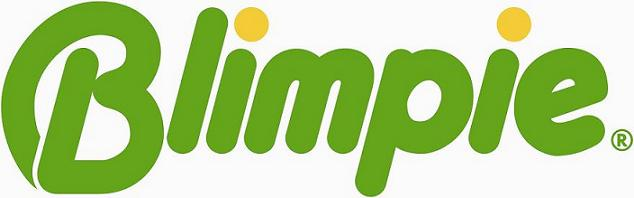
Blimpie's logo from 2005 until 2009

Blimpie's logo from 2009 until 2014

By the beginning of 1992, there were Blimpie restaurants in 27 states. That year, the chain passed the 500-unit mark and the company changed its name to Blimpie International, Inc. In the spring of 1993, Blimpie began trading its stock on the NASDAQ exchange. Around that time, the company began to more aggressively advertise than it had in the past, doubling its marketing budget to about $2 million per year. A new advertising campaign was launched, including television, radio, print, and point-of-purchase. This campaign marked the introduction of the chain's new tag line: "Simply Blimpie for fresh-sliced subs." Some television spots featured people on the street struggling to repeat the tongue-twisting phrase, "Simply Blimpie."

Blimpie system sales reached $132 million by 1993, and Blimpie International earned $1 million on $12 million in revenue. By autumn of that year, the chain had 670 outlets. Improved marketing support from the parent company reduced the rate of franchise failures from 10 percent to 3 percent. In some cases, such as in the Chicago market, Conza allowed franchisees to divert their 6 percent annual franchise fee to advertising.

As the 1990s continued, Blimpie devised a new concept that aimed to grow the company even more. Blimpie's franchises began appearing in nontraditional locations. First was convenience stores; as convenience store proprietors began to seek ways to compensate for declining cigarette sales, they turned to fast food. Blimpie's was appealing for many, mainly for two reasons: a real kitchen was not required, and startup costs were relatively low (as little as $35,000) compared with other fast-food operations. Among the early nontraditional sites for Blimpie's outlets were the Des Moines, Iowa-based Kum & Go convenience store chain, Texaco Food Marts in Mississippi, and the food court at the University of Texas. Blimpie's also became part of the first Home Depot superstore restaurant section, located in Atlanta.

In 1994, the company launched several new concepts to further its drive for nontraditional venues. The "Blimpie kiosk" was a movable, condensed restaurant that could fit into a 100-square-foot (9.3 m^{2}) area. The kiosk, which could serve four types of sandwiches, drinks, and side orders, was designed for use at stadiums, fairs, and other events. Other new concepts included a special refrigerated case for convenience stores (an expanding market), and the 'Blimpie Bakery', offering a variety of baked goods aimed at boosting early morning business.

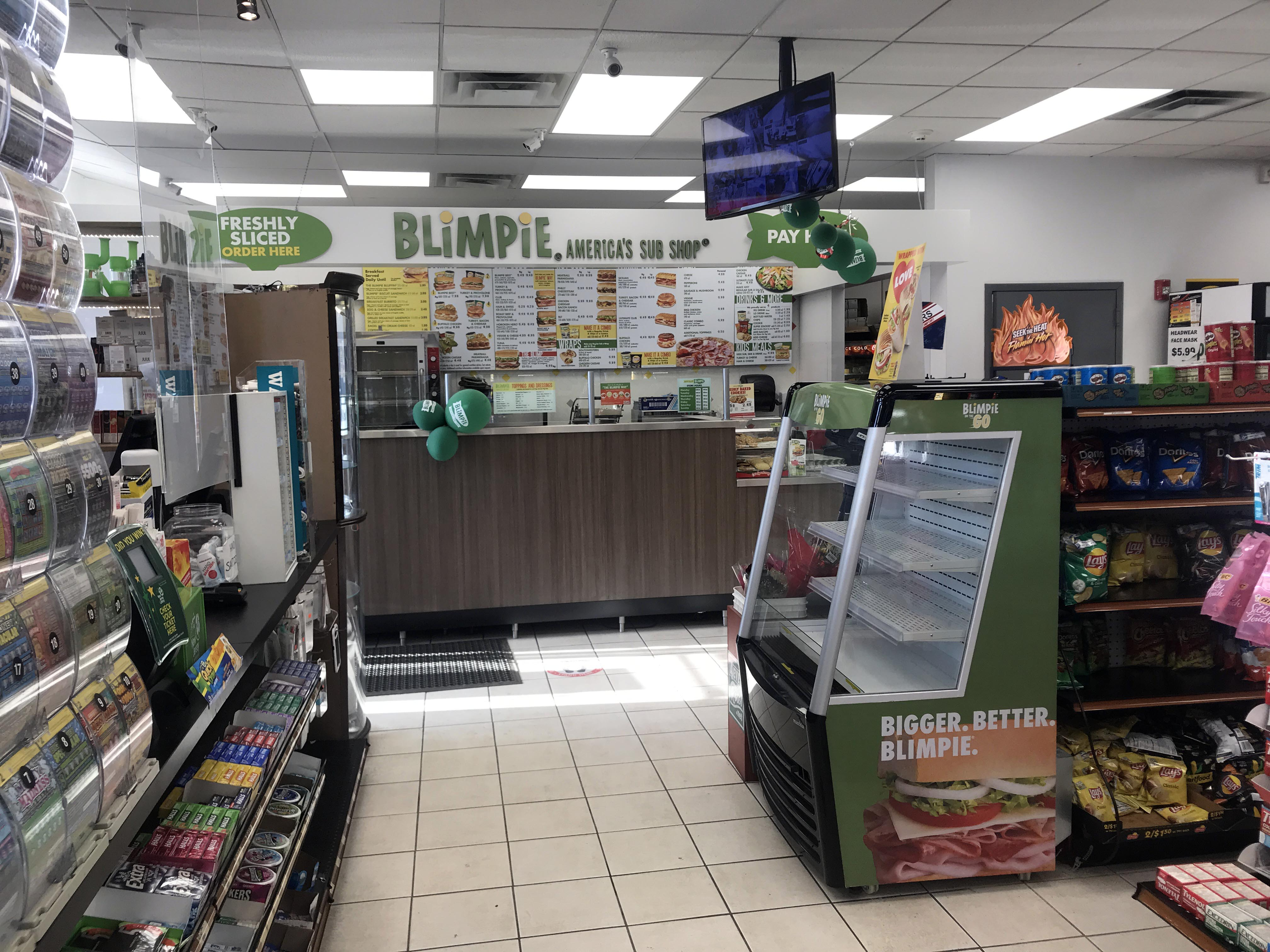
The Blimpie inside the Quick Mart convenience store in North Bergen, New Jersey

Blimpie reached two major milestones in 1995. One was that the chain passed the 1,000-outlet mark that year. Blimpie International opened its first international location in Stockholm, Sweden.

With the opening of new outlets in the US slowing and with overseas growth occurring at a slow pace (there were only 61 overseas locations in 15 countries by 2001), Blimpie launched a new diversification effort in the late 1990s. The first such initiative came late in 1997 when the company acquired a 75 percent stake in Maui Tacos, a fast-food chain with six units in Hawaii. This concept featured traditional quick-service Mexican food, such as burritos, tacos, and quesadillas, but with a Hawaiian twist, such as meat marinated in pineapple, lime, and other Hawaiian flavorings. Under Blimpie's majority ownership, Maui Tacos was soon introduced to the mainland, and by 2001 there were 15 units in nine states and the District of Columbia.

After almost two years of in-house development, Blimpie launched Pasta Central in 1999. Unlike Maui Tacos, Pasta Central was not a standalone concept but was created as a co-branding vehicle, coupled with Blimpie Subs & Salads. Co-branding emerged as a growth vehicle in the late 1990s and involved the placement of two (or more) restaurant brands within a single unit.

However, net income fell steadily throughout the second half of the 1990s. A main factor in this decline was that the subfranchiser rights to the Blimpie Subs chain had largely been sold by the mid-1990s, thus bringing a halt to what had been a steady stream of income, and by the turn of the 2000s, Blimpie International was struggling. As Blimpie's struggles continued, investors showed little interest in the company, and the price of the company's stock sagged. Seeing little benefit in being a publicly traded firm, Blimpie joined the growing ranks of restaurant companies fleeing the public market. In October 2001 a private investor group led by Jeffrey K. Endervelt, owner of the 44-unit Blimpie of California subfranchise, agreed to buy Blimpie International for $25.7 million. The transaction was completed in January 2002, whereupon Endervelt took over as chairman, president, and chief executive officer, and Conza, a partner in the investor group, remained in an advisory capacity. In 2006, Kahala Corp. acquired Blimpie, and it became the tenth brand franchised by the franchisor.

Around 2009 (also around the time they changed their logo) the brand came to Kuwait. However, by 2020 most of the locations had shut down, but there is still a location at the Kuwait International Airport.

By 2011, the number of Blimpie locations had fallen to 739 stores, and revenue was down to just over $110 million.

In 2016, MTY Food Group Inc. struck a deal valued at more than $300-million (U.S.) to acquire Arizona-based Kahala Brands Ltd. and its 2,900 locations in 25 countries.

As of 2023, there were 2 Blimpie restaurants in Singapore, one in KINEX and one in 313Somerset. However, these shut down in May 2023.

== See also ==
- List of submarine sandwich restaurants
- Last Lunch
