= List of Undercover Boss (American TV series) episodes =

Undercover Boss is an American reality television series, based on the British series of the same name and produced by Studio Lambert in both countries. Each episode depicts a person who has an upper-management position at a major business, deciding to go undercover as an entry-level employee to discover the faults in the company. The first season consisted of nine episodes produced in 2009 and first aired on February 7, 2010, on CBS. Companies that appear on the series are assured that the show will not damage their corporate brands.

During the course of the series, 136 episodes of Undercover Boss aired over eleven seasons.

== Series overview ==
Season	Episodes	Originally released	
Season	Episodes	First released	Last released
1	9	February 7, 2010	April 11, 2010
2	22	September 26, 2010	May 1, 2011
3	13	January 15, 2012	May 11, 2012
4	17	November 2, 2012	May 17, 2013
5	15	September 27, 2013	March 14, 2014
6	13	December 14, 2014	February 20, 2015
7	12	December 20, 2015	May 22, 2016
8	10	December 21, 2016	May 19, 2017
9	7	May 11, 2018	June 22, 2018
10	9	January 8, 2020	November 13, 2020
11	9	January 7, 2022	April 8, 2022

== Episodes ==
=== Season 1 (2010) ===
No. overall	No. in season	Title	Boss(es)	Original release date
1	1	"Waste Management"	Lawrence O'Donnell III	February 7, 2010
Lawrence O'Donnell, President and COO of Waste Management, works alongside his employees, cleaning porta-potties, sorting waste at one of their recycling plants, collecting garbage from a landfill and even being fired for the first time in his life. O'Donnell's mission is to garner an up-close look at his company and workforce to see how and where improvements can be made from both an operational and morale standpoint.
2	2	"Hooters"	Coby G. Brooks	February 14, 2010
When Coby G. Brooks, President and CEO of Hooters, goes undercover in his own company, he finds himself struggling to keep up in a fast-paced kitchen and is later forced to take immediate action when a restaurant manager steps out of line.
3	3	"7-Eleven"	Joseph DePinto	February 21, 2010
Joseph DePinto, President and CEO of 7-Eleven, goes undercover and discovers that a corporate policy is not being put into effect. Later on, a delivery driver's approach to life opens the undercover boss' eyes.
4	4	"White Castle"	Dave Rife	February 28, 2010
Dave Rife, Owner & Executive Board Member of White Castle, goes undercover in his own company where he accidentally ruins thousands of hamburger buns after mishandling equipment in one of his bakeries, and also discovers low morale among his employees at a local factory.
5	5	"Churchill Downs"	William C. Carstanjen	March 14, 2010
Bill Carstanjen, President & COO of Churchill Downs, goes undercover at his own racetracks. This however, proves difficult, as he is afraid of horses.
6	6	"GSI Commerce"	Michael G. Rubin	March 21, 2010
Michael G. Rubin, Chairman, President and CEO of GSI Commerce, the e-commerce giant behind numerous top U.S. retailers, goes undercover in his own company, where he discovers that rushing through a task can result in injury to others, and that his packing and shipping skills are not up to company standards.
7	7	"Herschend Family Entertainment"	Joel Manby	March 28, 2010
Joel Manby, President and CEO of Herschend Family Entertainment, a leader in the world of family theme parks and attractions, goes undercover. One of his employees says his dream job is CEO and correctly names Joel as the CEO, but does not recognize him.
8	8	"Roto-Rooter"	Rick L. Arquilla	April 4, 2010
President and COO of Roto-Rooter Rick L. Arquilla goes undercover in his own company and finds himself overwhelmed with emotion while working alongside several employees who force him to reflect on his past as well as his future legacy as the boss of their company.
9	9	"1-800-Flowers"	Chris McCann	April 11, 2010
Chris McCann, COO of 1-800-Flowers goes undercover in his own company where he discovers misconceptions about the brand. (His brother, James McCann, makes a cameo appearance but his identity is not concealed.)

=== Season 2 (2010–11) ===
No. overall	No. in season	Title	Boss(es)	Original release date
10	1	"Choice Hotels"	Steve Joyce	September 26, 2010
Steve Joyce, President and CEO of Choice Hotels, goes undercover facing jobs of managing the front desk, cleaning rooms and working with the maintenance crew to find the problems facing his company.
11	2	"Great Wolf Lodge"	Kimberly K. Schaefer	October 3, 2010
Kim Schaefer, CEO of Great Wolf Resorts, decides to go undercover, attempting numerous jobs at her chain of Lodges and discovers problems in the workplace. And she also gets a call no lifeguard wants to hear.
12	3	"DirecTV"	Mike White	October 10, 2010
Mike White, CEO of DirecTV, decides to go undercover, attempting the numerous jobs at his chain including working on the roof and inside the office and discovers problems in the workplace.
13	4	"Frontier Airlines"	Bryan Bedford	October 17, 2010
While working undercover on the company's front lines, Frontier Airlines CEO Bryan Bedford cleans a plane's lavatory, contributes to a flight's late departure and discovers how pay cuts are impacting employees' lives.
14	5	"NASCAR"	Steve Phelps	October 24, 2010
Steve Phelps, SVP and Chief Marketing Officer for NASCAR, goes undercover with one of the sport's pit crews and also struggles to keep pace working alongside a grounds crew preparing for the Coke Zero 400.
15	6	"Chiquita Brands International"	Fernando Aguirre	October 31, 2010
The CEO of Chiquita Brands International goes undercover and works as a farm worker who picks the fruit for sale.
16	7	"Chicago Cubs"	Todd Ricketts	November 7, 2010
While working undercover for his team, Chicago Cubs co-owner Todd Ricketts does jobs including cleaning bathrooms, parking cars (managing to keep his identity secret even after a fan recognized him), operating the manual scoreboard, and selling hot dogs at Wrigley Field.
17	8	"Lucky Strike Lanes"	Steven Foster	November 14, 2010
Steven Foster goes undercover in his company as the Lucky Strike Lanes mascot.
18	9	"Subway"	Don Fertman	November 21, 2010
Don Fertman, the Chief Development Officer of Subway, goes undercover in his company as a sandwich artist. Only to discover, he is a bad sandwich artist while being trained by one of the toughest, no-nonsense employees ever.
19	10	"ABM Industries"	Henrik Slipsager	December 5, 2010
The President and CEO of ABM Industries (Henrik Slipsager), which provides janitorial, engineering, parking and security services; takes a journey within his own corporation.
20	11	"Johnny Rockets"	John Fuller	December 12, 2010
John Fuller, President and CEO of Johnny Rockets, one of the nation's largest chains of retro-themed restaurants, goes undercover to work in a restaurant for the first time in his career. During his undercover stint, he fails his first taste test when tasked with preparing one of the company's signature hamburgers, and also panics when he thinks his cover has been blown.
21	12	"Norwegian Cruise Line"	Kevin Sheehan	January 2, 2011
Kevin Sheehan, CEO of Norwegian Cruise Line, one of the largest cruise lines, goes undercover and works on the ships Norwegian Epic and Pride of America. He thinks it will be a piece of cake until he actually tries and he realizes he has some changes to make. He is nearly outed by one of his employees.
22	13	"UniFirst"	Ronald Croatti	January 9, 2011
The CEO of UniFirst, one of North America's largest workwear and textile services companies, goes undercover to clean and repair uniforms.
23	14	"Belfor"	Sheldon Yellen	January 16, 2011
The CEO of Belfor, the largest home restoration company in the world, goes undercover to clean and repair homes. Along the way he becomes emotional and purposely blows his cover to an employee.
24	15	"Mack Trucks"	Denny Slagle	February 20, 2011
The CEO of Mack Trucks, part of Volvo Group — the second largest manufacturer of trucks in the world, goes undercover and works at the assembly plants, and secretly sends his wife undercover at a facility where he believes he will likely be recognized.
25	16	"City of Cincinnati"	Mark L. Mallory	March 6, 2011
The mayor of Cincinnati Mark Mallory goes undercover working as a mechanic and a sanitation worker.
26	17	"United Van Lines"	Rich McClure	March 13, 2011
The CEO of United Van Lines, Rich McClure goes undercover in his company.
27	18	"MGM Grand"	Scott Sibella	March 20, 2011
Scott Sibella, the President and COO of the MGM Grand Las Vegas, goes undercover in his company.
28	19	"Synagro"	Bill Massa	March 27, 2011
Bill Massa, the President and CEO of Synagro, goes undercover in his company.
29	20	"Baja Fresh"	David Kim	April 10, 2011
David Kim, the CEO of Baja Fresh, goes undercover in his company.
30	21	"BrightStar Care"	Shelly Sun	April 17, 2011
Shelly Sun, the co-founder and CEO of BrightStar Care, goes undercover in her company — her husband J.D., the company's head of franchise development, does one undercover assignment as well.
31	22	"University of California, Riverside"	Chancellor Timothy White	May 1, 2011
Timothy White, the Chancellor of University of California, Riverside (UCR), goes undercover in his University.

=== Season 3 (2012) ===
No. overall	No. in season	Title	Boss(es)	Original release date
32	1	"Diamond Resorts International"	Stephen J. Cloobeck	January 15, 2012
Stephen J. Cloobeck, Chairman and CEO of Diamond Resorts International, goes undercover at his resorts.
33	2	"The Dwyer Group"	Dina Dwyer-Owens	January 22, 2012
Dina Dwyer-Owens, Chairwoman and CEO of The Dwyer Group, goes undercover in her company. The Dwyer Group provides plumbing services, electrical work, auto glass repairs, and landscaping services.
34	3	"Kendall-Jackson"	Rick Tigner	January 29, 2012
Rick Tigner, President of Kendall-Jackson Wine Estates, goes undercover in his luxury wine company.
35	4	"Checkers and Rally's"	Rick Silva	February 17, 2012
Checkers and Rally's CEO Rick Silva works undercover at his burger chain; in his first assignment, Silva is so disgusted by the abusive manner in which the general manager treats his employees that he reveals his true identity and shuts down the restaurant until further notice.
36	5	"American Seafoods"	Bernt Bodal	February 24, 2012
American Seafoods CEO Bernt Bodal works undercover at his company.
37	6	"Popeyes Louisiana Kitchen"	Lynne Zappone	March 2, 2012
Popeyes Louisiana Kitchen Chief Talent Officer Lynne Zappone works undercover at her restaurants.
38	7	"Oriental Trading Company"	Sam Taylor	March 9, 2012
Oriental Trading Company CEO Sam Taylor works undercover at his company.
39	8	"Yankee Candle"	Harlan Kent	March 30, 2012
Yankee Candle Company CEO Harlen Kent works undercover at his company's retail stores and packaging center.
40	9	"TaylorMade Golf Company"	Mark King	April 6, 2012
CEO Mark King goes inside every department of his company TaylorMade Golf.
41	10	"Budget Blinds"	Chad Hallock	April 13, 2012
CEO and co-founder of Budget Blinds Chad Hallock goes undercover as an ex-artist named Tom. He works as a blinds builder and a blinds hanger, but has a hard time at both.
42	11	"Philly Pretzel Factory"	Dan DiZio	April 27, 2012
CEO of the Philly Pretzel Factory Dan DiZio goes undercover in his company. He makes and delivers pretzels. However, at one franchise, he may have a hard time staying undercover.
43	12	"Fastsigns"	Catherine Monson	May 4, 2012
CEO and President Catherine Monson goes undercover at Fastsigns.
44	13	"MasTec"	José Mas	May 11, 2012
MasTec CEO Jose Mas goes undercover and receives an explosive surprise.

=== Season 4 (2012–13) ===
No. overall	No. in season	Title	Boss(es)	Original release date
45	1	"Modell's Sporting Goods"	Mitchell Modell	November 2, 2012
Modell's Sporting Goods's CEO Mitchell Modell goes undercover in his own company.
46	2	"Tilted Kilt"	Ron Lynch	November 9, 2012
Tilted Kilt's President Ron Lynch goes undercover in his Celtic themed sports bar and restaurant chain.
47	3	"Cinnabon"	Kat Cole	November 16, 2012
Kat Cole, President of Cinnabon, the most recognized cinnamon roll brand with over 770 franchised outlets, goes undercover in her company.
48	4	"Diamond Resorts International: Take Two"	Stephen J. Cloobeck	November 30, 2012
Cloobeck goes back undercover (the first executive to make a second appearance on the show), this time focusing on properties that Diamond Resorts International acquired from Pacific Monarch Resorts when the latter declared bankruptcy.
49	5	"PostNet"	Steven J. Greenbaum	December 6, 2012
PostNet co-founder Steven J. Greenbaum goes undercover to examine the integrity of his company.
50	6	"Mood Media"	Lorne Abony	January 4, 2013
Mood Media CEO Lorne Abony works undercover at his company.
51	7	"Kampgrounds of America"	Jim Rogers	January 11, 2013
Kampgrounds of America CEO Jim Rogers works undercover at his company.
52	8	"Moe's Southwest Grill"	Paul Damico	January 18, 2013
Moe's Southwest Grill president Paul Damico works undercover at his company.
53	9	"Boston Market"	Sara Bittorf	February 1, 2013
Boston Market Chief Brand Officer Sara Bittorf works undercover at her company — and is driven to blow her cover and fire a customer-hating employee.
54	10	"O'Neill"	Toby Bost	February 22, 2013
O'Neill CEO Toby Bost goes undercover to follow his company's clothing from production to sale.
55	11	"Squaw Valley"	Andy Wirth	March 8, 2013
President and CEO Andy Wirth goes undercover at his Squaw Valley and Alpine Meadows ski resorts; Olympic gold medalist Jonny Moseley hosts the ersatz reality show Wirth is supposedly appearing on.
56	12	"Fatburger"	Andy Wiederhorn	April 5, 2013
Fatburger CEO Andy Wiederhorn works undercover at his restaurants.
57	13	"ADT"	Tony Wells	April 12, 2013
ADT security services Chief Marketing and Customer Officer Tony Wells works undercover at his company.
58	14	"Retro Fitness"	Eric Casaburi	April 26, 2013
Retro Fitness CEO Eric Casaburi works undercover at his franchised full service fitness centers, and encounters a rude employee who is later fired.
59	15	"Orkin"	John Wilson	May 3, 2013
John Wilson, President and Chief Operating Officer of Rollins Inc., the parent company for Orkin, works undercover at his company.
60	16	"Epic Employees"	N/A	May 10, 2013
Employees who were featured in previous episodes discuss how the series has impacted their lives. The employees featured were originally from the episodes (in order): 7-Eleven, Philly Pretzel Factory, Boston Market, Modell’s Sporting Goods, Diamond Resorts, Diamond Resorts: Take 2, Retro Fitness, Checkers & Rally’s, Squaw Valley Resorts, Herschend Family Entertainment, and Waste Management.
61	17	"Epic Bosses"	N/A	May 17, 2013
Bosses from past episodes discuss how the series impacted their lives. The bosses featured were originally from the episodes (in order): Hooters, Cinnabon, NASCAR, Diamond Resorts, Diamond Resorts: Take 2, Subway, Belfor, DirecTV, Modell’s Sporting Goods, City of Cincinnati, The Dwyer Group, Checkers and Rally’s, and Kendall–Jackson.

=== Season 5 (2013–14) ===
No. overall	No. in season	Title	Boss(es)	Original release date
62	1	"Twin Peaks"	Randy Dewitt	September 27, 2013
Randy DeWitt, co-founder and CEO of sports bar and grill chain Twin Peaks, goes undercover posing as a contestant on a reality TV competition who wants to win money to start his own business; at his second stop, former Hooter's CEO (and Undercover Boss participant) Coby Brooks — now a Twin Peaks franchisee — poses as an obnoxious customer so DeWitt can see how the employees react.
63	2	"Loehmann's"	Steven Newman	October 4, 2013
Steven Newman, CEO of Loehmann's department stores, goes undercover posing as an aspiring entrepreneur in a reality TV contest who is trying to win money to start up his own firm.
64	3	"Donatos Pizza"	Jane Grote Abell	October 11, 2013
Jane Grote Abell, Chairwoman of Donatos Pizza and daughter of the company's founder, goes undercover posing as a contestant on a reality TV show who is trying to win money to open her own restaurant.
65	4	"Buffets, Inc."	Anthony Wedo	October 18, 2013
Anthony Wedo, President and CEO of buffet restaurant organisation Buffets, Inc., goes undercover posing as a construction worker taking part in a reality TV competition to win money to start up his own firm.
66	5	"Menchie's"	Amit Kleinberger	October 25, 2013
Amit Kleinberger, CEO and co-owner of frozen yogurt chain Menchie's, goes undercover in his own firm posing as a participant in a reality TV contest who is trying to win money to fund and develop a new business.
67	6	"Alfred Angelo"	Paul Quentel	November 1, 2013
Paul Quentel, President of Alfred Angelo, the second largest bridal retailer in the U.S., goes undercover in his own company posing as a personal trainer who is competing in a reality TV show to win money to start his own business.
68	7	"Family Dollar"	Mike Bloom	November 8, 2013
Mike Bloom, President and COO of discount retail chain Family Dollar, goes undercover posing as a contestant on a reality TV competition who is trying to win money to open his own bar.
69	8	"Dutch Bros. Coffee"	Travis Boersma	November 15, 2013
Travis Boersma, co-founder and President of Dutch Bros. Coffee, the largest privately owned drive-through coffee shop chain in the U.S., goes undercover posing as a reality TV show contestant who is trying to win money to open a restaurant.
70	9	"Busted!"	N/A	November 22, 2013
Ex-undercover boss Eric Casaburi brings together six former participants in the series who were either 'busted', 'nearly busted' or 'self-busted' while working in disguise among their own employees. The bosses featured were originally from the episodes (in order): Retro Fitness, Cinnabon, Moe’s Southwest Grill, Fatburger, Belfor, Buffets, Inc., and Donatos Pizza.
71	10	"Massage Heights"	Shane Evans	December 13, 2013
Shane Evans is COO and co-founder of Massage Heights, one of the biggest massage therapy chains in North America. She goes undercover posing as a participant in a reality TV contest who is trying to win money to fund her own business.
72	11	"Mohegan Sun"	Bruce "Two Dogs" Bozsum	January 17, 2014
Bruce 'Two Dogs' Bozsum is Chairman of the Board of Mohegan Sun, a Native American gaming and entertainment empire owned and operated by the Mohegan tribe of Connecticut.
73	12	"Hudson News Group"	Joe DiDomizio	January 31, 2014
Joe DiDomizio is President and CEO of Hudson Group, a travel retailer that operates newsstands, bookshops, cafés and speciality stores in 70 airports and other transportation terminals throughout North America.
74	13	"Utah Jazz"	Greg Miller	February 28, 2014
Greg Miller, CEO of the Larry H Miller Group of Companies and co-owner of National Basketball Association team the Utah Jazz, goes undercover posing as a competitor in a reality television contest who is aiming to win a dream job.
75	14	"Undercover Employee"	N/A	March 7, 2014
Three former undercover bosses, wanting to take a second look at their companies, send one of the employees they worked with to do their own undercover assignment. The bosses featured were Kleinberger (CEO and co-owner of frozen yogurt chain Menchie's), Dewitt (co-founder and CEO of sports bar and grill chain Twin Peaks), and Greenbaum (co-founder and CEO of PostNet); much to the CEO's amusement, Greenbaum's employee is not only recognized, but shown a YouTube clip from his original appearance on the show.
76	15	"Sky Zone"	Jeff Platt	March 14, 2014
Jeff Platt, President and CEO of entertainment and fitness business Sky Zone, a chain of indoor trampoline parks, goes undercover in his own company posing as a contestant on a reality TV competition who is trying to win an action-adventure holiday.

=== Season 6 (2014–15) ===
No. overall	No. in season	Title	Boss(es)	Original release date	US viewers (millions)
77	1	"True Value"	John Hartmann	December 14, 2014	8.92
John Hartman, a former FBI agent and the President and CEO of True Value, goes undercover to learn more about how his company and his employees operate.
78	2	"Mayor of Pittsburgh"	Bill Peduto	December 21, 2014	8.19
Pittsburgh Mayor Bill Peduto goes undercover as a municipal worker and finds himself working in different departments undertaking various tasks and responsibilities. One employee (who stated that he did not vote for him in the past election) recognizes him and he is forced to reveal his true identity to the employee.
79	3	"Bikinis Sports Bar & Grill"	Doug Guller	December 28, 2014	9.18
Doug Guller, founder and CEO of Bikinis Sports Bar & Grill, encounters an employee who not only refuses to don the uniform's bikini top, but also over-serves an intoxicated person. NOTE: This episode drew controversy due to Guller firing a bartender for not wearing a bikini top on television, as well as incentivizing a different waitress by offering to pay for her breast augmentation. Bikinis Sports Bar & Grill ultimately went defunct in 2018.
80	4	"Maaco"	Jose Costa	January 2, 2015	8.61
Jose finds an employee who is cutting corners (who later confessed that he was ordered to do so from past Maaco managers revealing that McDonaldization is being practiced), one war veteran who needs to work out in the cold because of poor facilities and one who goes the extra mile.
81	5	"Phenix Salon Inc"	Gina Rivera	January 9, 2015	8.59
Gina Rivera, Founder and President of Phenix Salons INC., a franchise which offers independent salon and business professionals the opportunity to own and operate their own luxury salon suites, goes undercover to see if it will color her perception of how the company is running.
82	6	"EmpireCLS"	David Seelinger	January 16, 2015	8.35
David Seelinger, Chairman and CEO of EmpireCLS Worldwide Chauffeured Services, a luxury chauffeured transportation leader that provides services in more than 700 cities worldwide, goes undercover to see if his company is running smoothly.
83	7	"Rocket Fizz"	Robert Powells	January 23, 2015	8.42
Robert Powells, President and Co-Founder of The Rocket Fizz Soda Pop and Candy Shops, the largest candy and soda shop franchise in America, embarks on an emotional journey to discover what keeps his candy shops sweet.
84	8	"Forman Mills"	Rick Forman	January 25, 2015	8.80
Rick Forman, Founder and CEO of Forman Mills Inc., one of the fastest-growing discount clothing outlets in the country, discovers some defects in his organization.
85	9	"Stella & Dot"	Jessica Herrin	January 30, 2015	8.13
Jessica Herrin, CEO and Founder of Stella & Dot, a leading global direct sales company with its own boutique-style jewelry and accessories line, goes on an undercover journey to discover the real gems working within her company.
86	10	"Armando Montelongo"	Armando Montelongo	February 6, 2015	7.84
Armando Montelongo goes undercover in his business. He disguised himself as an electrician, a seminar student, and a call center employee "to see what keeps his real estate investment company on solid ground" and make sure nothing untoward is going on
87	11	"Gigi's Cupcakes"	Gigi Butler	February 13, 2015	8.53
Gigi Butler goes undercover at several of her locations and is not prepared for some of what she sees.
88	12	"Peavey Electronics"	Courtland Gray	February 15, 2015	6.46
NOTE: At the end of this episode, it was revealed that, four months after production, Plant 3 (Peavey Electronics's main manufacturing facility, where Gray was undercover) would be significantly downsized. One featured employee (Thresa) was laid off, while another (Mike, who actually recognized Gray) was upset since he had another offer but was convinced to remain with Peavey, and now was unable to accept the previous offer.
89	13	"Vivint"	Todd Pedersen	February 20, 2015	7.93
Vivint CEO Todd Pedersen accidentally blows his cover on his first job by introducing himself by his first name.

=== Season 7 (2015–16) ===
No. overall	No. in season	Title	Boss(es)	Original release date	US viewers (millions)
90	1	"Buffalo Wings & Rings"	Nader Massadeh	December 20, 2015	7.51
Buffalo Wings & Rings CEO Nader Masadeh goes undercover to find out how his blossoming franchise is going in hopes of more expansion. Along the way he finds good employees and one bully who needs to be dealt with.
91	2	"Nestlé Toll House Café"	Shawnon Bellah	December 27, 2015	7.89
No-nonsense COO Shawnon Bellah goes undercover to make sure the future of Nestle Toll House Cafe by Chip remains sweet, but she experiences a sugar crash when she fails to meet her own customer service requirements.
92	3	"Shopper's World"	Sam Dushey	January 3, 2016	7.99
When President and CEO Sam Dushey goes undercover at Shoppers World to ensure he's filling the shoes of his grandfather who founded his company in the 1930s, he's shocked to find a security-deficient store in which shoplifters are walking away with his merchandise.
93	4	"Muscle Maker Grill"	Tim M. Betts	January 8, 2016	6.93
As Tim M. Betts, the new chairman of Muscle Maker Grill, goes undercover, Rod Silva, the high-energy founder of the company, secretly gives Betts ongoing commentary as he observes the action via a live video feed.
94	5	"YESCo (Young Electric Sign Company)"	Jeffrey S. Young	January 15, 2016	6.50
Jeffrey S. Young, co-owner of YESCO, a custom electric sign company that fabricates, installs and provides service for signs, electronic display systems and lighting, has to face his fear of heights when tasked with changing a light high above downtown Chicago.
95	6	"Gerber Group"	Scott Gerber	January 22, 2016	7.94
Scott Gerber, Principal and CEO of Gerber Group, a hospitality industry leader with 14 chic hotel bar and restaurant venues, including Whiskey Park, Whisky Blue and The Roof, goes undercover to meet his employees who keep the party going.
96	7	"Marco's Pizza"	Bryon Stephens	January 29, 2016	7.26
Bryon Stephens, President and COO of Marco's Pizza, the nation's fastest-growing pizza franchise with nearly 700 locations in 35 states, goes undercover to meet the employees who rake in the "dough" for his company.
97	8	"4 Wheel Parts"	Greg Adler	February 5, 2016	6.75
Greg Adler, President and CEO of 4 Wheel Parts, the global leader in truck, Jeep, SUV and off-road tires, wheels, lift kits and accessories, goes undercover to meet the employees who keep his company on the right track.
98	9	"Hamburger Mary's"	Ashley & Brandon Wright	May 15, 2016	5.74
Identical twin brothers Ashley and Brandon Wright, co-owners of Hamburger Mary's, a flamboyant franchise of LGBT-friendly restaurants that serve gourmet burgers and cocktails, along with drag shows and nightly entertainment, each work undercover as the other watches via a live video feed.
99	10	"United Real Estate Group"	Dan Duffy	May 20, 2016	4.06
Dan Duffy, the CEO of United Real Estate Group, a real estate franchise serving residential metropolitan markets and idyllic lifestyle and investment markets, goes undercover to meet the employees who close the deals at his company.
100	11	"Wienerschnitzel"	Cynthia Galardi Culpepper	May 22, 2016	4.88
Cynthia Galardi-Culpepper, CEO and Chairperson of Wienerschnitzel, the world's largest hot dog chain with more than 330 locations throughout the U.S., Panama and Guam, struggles to pull her weight as just another link in the chain.
101	12	"Golden Krust Caribbean Bakery & Grill"	Lowell Hawthorne	May 22, 2016	3.89
Lowell Hawthorne, President and CEO of Golden Krust Caribbean Bakery & Grill, goes undercover at the family-owned manufacturer, distributor and franchisor of Caribbean-inspired cuisine with 120 locations and products in 20,000 supermarkets, and discovers some of the chefs don't have the company's official recipes.

=== Season 8 (2016–17) ===
No. overall	No. in season	Title	Boss(es)	Original release date	US viewers (millions)
102	1	"Build-A-Bear Workshop"	Sharon Price John	December 21, 2016	5.90
Sharon Price John, President and CEO, Build-A-Bear Workshop, a worldwide experiential retail company which gives guests an opportunity to make their own customizable stuffed animal, goes undercover and learns that building bears isn't all child's play.
103	2	"Mayor of Gary, Indiana"	Karen Freeman-Wilson	December 21, 2016	5.37
Karen Freeman-Wilson, Mayor of Gary, Indiana, goes undercover as a municipal employee in her own city.
104	3	"New York & Company"	Greg Scott	December 28, 2016	6.27
Greg Scott, CEO New York & Company, a women's fashion retailer designing on-trend, versatile, affordable collections that are available in over 480 domestic stores and on their ecommerce site, goes undercover to work alongside the people who keep his company "en vogue".
105	4	"Painting with a Twist"	Renee Maloney	January 4, 2017	6.41
Renee Maloney, co-founder and CFO of Painting with a Twist, the nation's first and leading paint-and-sip franchise where guests come together to experience a unique night out that includes friends, paint and the option to BYOB, goes undercover to meet the people who make her company a masterpiece.
106	5	"AdvantaClean"	Jeff Dudan	January 11, 2017	6.08
Jeff Dudan, CEO and Founder of AdvantaClean, a Light Environmental Service franchise company that helps make homes clean, safe, healthy and energy efficient, gets down and dirty while tackling masses of mold in a water-damaged kitchen and in a tight, dark crawl space beneath another client's home.
107	6	"The Coffee Bean & Tea Leaf"	John Fuller	January 18, 2017	5.83
John Fuller, the new president and CEO of The Coffee Bean & Tea Leaf, one of the world's largest independent and privately owned specialty coffee and tea retailers, born and brewed in Southern California since 1963, goes undercover to meet the employees who keep his company brewing. Fuller previously went undercover in season two when he was the CEO of Johnny Rockets, making him the second boss to go undercover twice, after Stephen J. Cloobeck.
108	7	"Taco Bueno"	Mike Roper	April 28, 2017	5.31
Michael Roper, president and CEO of Taco Bueno, a high quality Tex-Mex chain founded in Abilene, Texas in 1967, with more than 175 restaurants, goes undercover to be certain everything at his company is "bueno."
109	8	"Associa"	John Carona	May 5, 2017	5.04
John Carona, founder and CEO of Associa, the leader in community association management for more than 37 years that oversees the day-to-day operations of over 9,000 HOAs and condominiums and protects the property value of 5 million owners' homes, goes undercover to meet the employees who keep his company's foundation strong.
110	9	"Celebrity Undercover Boss: Darius Rucker"	Darius Rucker	May 12, 2017	5.47
Musician Darius Rucker travels to Austin, Texas, where he goes undercover to run an open mic night, work as a roadie, and walk the city's famous Sixth Street in search of a talent.
111	10	"Celebrity Undercover Boss: Marcus Samuelsson"	Marcus Samuelsson	May 19, 2017	5.00
Internationally acclaimed chef and restaurateur Marcus Samuelsson goes undercover to find and mentor new culinary talent. During his mission, he discovers some gifted aspiring chefs at a public cooking class, a culinary institute, a high-end food truck, and a soup kitchen.

=== Season 9: Celebrity Undercover Boss (2018) ===
No. overall	No. in season	Title	Boss(es)	Original release date	US viewers (millions)
112	1	"Gabby Douglas"	Gabby Douglas	May 11, 2018	5.03
113	2	"Idina Menzel"	Idina Menzel	May 18, 2018	4.60
114	3	"Bethany Mota"	Bethany Mota	May 25, 2018	3.36
115	4	"Deion Sanders"	Deion Sanders	June 1, 2018	4.82
116	5	"Jewel"	Jewel Kilcher	June 8, 2018	4.44
117	6	"Stephanie McMahon"	Stephanie McMahon	June 15, 2018	4.09
118	7	"Ashley Graham"	Ashley Graham	June 22, 2018	4.10

=== Season 10 (2020) ===
No. overall	No. in season	Title	Boss(es)	Original release date	US viewers (millions)
119	1	"Walk-On's Bistreaux & Bar"	Brandon Landry & Drew Brees	January 8, 2020	4.25
Brandon Landry, Founder, Co-Owner and CEO of Walk-On's Bistreaux & Bar goes undercover as a Dock Supervisor. Drew Brees, the company's co-owner, finds it hard work when he goes undercover as a Kitchen Porter. Landry travels to Lafayette, Louisiana to experience life as an Assistant Manager in one the company's top performing branches.
120	2	"Anytime Fitness"	Stacy Anderson	January 15, 2020	4.38
Stacy Anderson, Brand President of Anytime Fitness, the world's largest and fastest-growing fitness franchise travels to Lebanon, Indiana, and goes undercover as a gym manager. In Roswell, Georgia, Anderson experiences the work of a Franchise Owner. Anderson visits their Tipton, Indiana gym and poses as a Personal Trainer.
121	3	"Dippin’ Dots"	Scott Fischer	January 22, 2020	4.43
Scott Fischer, CEO, of ice cream snack company Dippin’ Dots goes undercover in Paducah, Kentucky (home of Dippin’ Dots) on the production line at one of the company's manufacturing plants. Next Fischer works as a Warehouse Operator. In Louisville, Kentucky Fischer works as a supervisor at Kentucky Kingdom. Finally, Fischer works as an Events Server in Richmond, California.
122	4	"Clean Harbors"	Alan McKim	January 27, 2020	3.43
Alan McKim, founder and CEO, of Clean Harbors, America's largest hazardous waste disposal company goes undercover. McKim travels to the Safety-Kleen Oil Re-Refinery in East Chicago, Indiana. In South Plainfield, New Jersey McKim works as Field Tech and sees first hand how the company helped in the clean-up in the aftermath of the 9/11 attacks in New York City. In Austwell, Texas McKim experiences the role of a natural disaster first responder. McKim concludes his undercover investigations in Braintree, Massachusetts as a company Truck Driver.
123	5	"TGI Fridays"	Ray Blanchette	October 2, 2020	3.07
Ray Blanchette, CEO of TGI Fridays goes under cover in the kitchen and behind the bar to cook up extra business at two locations.
124	6	"Bowlero"	Colie Edison	October 9, 2020	2.74
Colie Edison, chief customer officer of Bowlero and CEO of the Professional Bowlers Association, goes under cover at a bowling alley.
125	7	"Club Med"	Xavier Mufraggi	October 16, 2020	2.71
Xavier Mufraggi, CEO of Club Med North American and the Caribbean goes undercover at two of the company's locations. Firstly, at their Punta Cana resort, Mufraggi experiences the roles of a Bar Worker, and also a Trainee Chef. At their Cancun resort, Mufraggi works as an Events Manager Trainee, and also as a Nurse.
126	8	"Smoothie King"	Wan Kim	October 23, 2020	2.26
Wan Kim, CEO of Smoothie King goes undercover in four positions within the company: as a Team Member Trainee; as a Trainee at a Franchise Store; as a Production Line Trainee; and as a Promotions Trainee.
127	9	"Mayor of Shreveport"	Adrian Perkins	November 13, 2020	2.47
Shreveport Mayor Adrian Perkins goes undercover as a firefighter with the Shreveport Fire Department; as a Recreation Park Manager; as a Police Officer with the Shreveport Police Department; and as a Parks Maintenance Worker.

=== Season 11 (2022) ===
No. overall	No. in season	Title	Boss(es)	Original release date	US viewers (millions)
128	1	"College HUNKS"	Omar Soliman & Nick Friedman	January 7, 2022	3.86
Omar Soliman and Nick Friedman, who co-founded College HUNKS Hauling Junk & Moving over 15 years ago, go on separate missions to make certain that the foundation of their company is strong enough to withstand exponential growth in the next couple of years.
129	2	"Fremont Street Experience"	Andrew Simon	January 14, 2022	4.23
Andrew Simon, president and CEO, Fremont Street Experience, who began his job at this hugely popular Las Vegas attraction at the start of the pandemic, goes undercover to discover and address problems that may be sparking the labor shortage causing significant lost profits.
130	3	"The Vitamin Shoppe"	Sharon M. Leite	January 21, 2022	4.11
The Vitamin Shoppe's CEO, Sharon M. Leite, goes undercover to learn new ways to achieve added growth for her brand and to experience how her new operational changes and innovations are impacting the front lines.
131	4	"Rita's Ice"	Linda L. Chadwick	January 28, 2022	3.18
Linda L. Chadwick, president and CEO, Rita's Italian Ice & Frozen Custard goes undercover to see how her new initiatives are working and to help franchisees become more profitable.
132	5	"Round Table Pizza"	Paul Damico	February 25, 2022	3.68
Paul Damico, the former president and CEO, Round Table Pizza goes undercover to glean effective ways to expand the longstanding West Coast pizza franchise eastward and attract a younger clientele. Damico previously went undercover in season four when he was the president of Moe’s Southwest Grill, making him the third boss to go undercover twice, after Stephen J. Cloobeck and John Fuller.
133	6	"UScellular"	Laurent "LT" Therivel	March 4, 2022	3.50
Laurent "LT" Therivel, a proud Marine veteran who started as president and CEO of UScellular less than a year before his undercover mission, is intent on seeing how his new endeavors for brand growth are operating.
134	7	"Restoration 1"	Gary Findley	March 11, 2022	3.56
Gary Findley, CEO of Restoration 1, a self-described "Redneck CEO" from Texas, goes undercover to ensure that there are no flaws in the "playbook" of the company that would negatively impact all the franchises.
135	8	"Mayor of Fontana"	Mayor Acquanetta Warren	April 1, 2022	2.75
Acquanetta Warren, mayor of Fontana, Calif., the fastest-growing city in Southern California, is on a mission to secure its future after the devastating impacts of the pandemic.
136	9	"Coco's Bakery"	Warren Boone	April 8, 2022	3.34
Warren Boone, chief people officer at Coco's Bakery Restaurants, seeks to determine the recipe for success by working on the shop floor.
