= Celebrity Undercover Boss =

Undercover Boss
- Season 9
- Starring: Gabby Douglas; Idina Menzel; Bethany Mota; Deion Sanders; Jewel Kilcher; Stephanie McMahon; Ashley Graham
- No. of episodes: 7

Release
- Original network: CBS
- Original release: June 22, 2018

Celebrity Undercover Boss, also known as Undercover Boss: Celebrity Edition is the ninth season of the American reality television series Undercover Boss. It premiered on May 11, 2018.

Unlike previous seasons (and contrary to its name), in Celebrity Undercover Boss the celebrities featured do not mingle with their own employees, but don a disguise to find unsuspecting talented people in their line of work. The first promotional video for the season was released on April 26, 2018.

== Production ==
During the eighth season of Undercover Boss, CBS aired two celebrity episodes of the series. Like prior seasons, Celebrity Undercover Boss is produced by Studio Lambert in association with All3Media America, with Stephen Lambert, Sean Foley and Greg Goldman as executive producers.

== Episodes ==
Following the announcement of the season, CBS announced the first four celebrities. Additional celebrities were announced at a later date.

| No. overall | No. in season | Title | Boss(es) | Original release date | US viewers (millions) |
|---|---|---|---|---|---|
| 112 | 1 | "Gabby Douglas" | Gabby Douglas | May 11, 2018 | 5.03 |
Two-time U.S. Olympic women's gymnastics team member, three-time Olympic Gold medalist, a two-time New York Times bestselling author and one of the most celebrated Olympic gymnasts of all time. Douglas goes undercover to discover incredibly gifted gymnasts and coaches.
| 113 | 2 | "Idina Menzel" | Idina Menzel | May 18, 2018 | 4.60 |
Tony Award-winning, multi-platinum recording artist and actress Idina Menzel slips into an undercover role to find the next Broadway sensation and tries to remain incognito when she's asked to sing her signature song, 'Let it Go,' to a group of children.
| 114 | 3 | "Bethany Mota" | Bethany Mota | May 25, 2018 | 3.36 |
YouTube sensation Bethany Mota channels a punk rocker when she goes undercover to link up with and mentor potential YouTube stars. While pretending she wants to start her own YouTube channel, Mota hopes things will click when tasked with teaching a dance class for a YouTube channel; picks up the beat in a beatboxing challenge on Hollywood Boulevard; and fears she won't be able to keep it together when faced with eating a cricket during a YouTube food challenge.
| 115 | 4 | "Deion Sanders" | Deion Sanders | June 1, 2018 | 4.82 |
Two-time Super Bowl champion and Pro Football Hall of Famer Deion Sanders tackles an undercover mission to reward youth football coaches and give back to his community.
| 116 | 5 | "Jewel" | Jewel Kilcher | June 8, 2018 | 4.44 |
Singer-songwriter Jewel, a four-time Grammy Award nominee, one of the most successful singer-songwriters of all time, who has sold over 30 million albums worldwide, goes undercover to discover gifted musicians and artisans to recruit for her Handmade Holiday Tour.
| 117 | 6 | "Stephanie McMahon" | Stephanie McMahon | June 15, 2018 | 4.09 |
Chief brand officer of World Wrestling Entertainment, Inc. (WWE), one of the most successful sports and entertainment brands in the world, and a longtime on-air villainous WWE character, Stephanie McMahon "slams" into undercover mode to find raw talent, and helps a young WWE fan's charitable dreams come true.
| 118 | 7 | "Ashley Graham" | Ashley Graham | June 22, 2018 | 4.10 |
Ashley Graham, accomplished model and body activist, poses as an aspiring model while seeking out like-minded curvy models and meeting a trailblazing young ballerina with a massive social media following.
