= Buffalo Wings & Rings =

American sports restaurant franchise

Wings & Rings
- Company type: Privately held
- Industry: Restaurant Franchising
- Genre: Casual dining
- Founded: 1984; 42 years ago
- Founders: Haytham David, Nader Masadeh, Philip Schram
- Headquarters: Cincinnati, Ohio, USA
- Number of locations: 61 USA, 24 International
- Key people: Nader Masadeh (President and CEO), Philip Schram
- Products: Buffalo wings, sandwiches, chicken fingers, salads,
- Number of employees: 300 Corporate
- Website: www.wingsandrings.com

Wings & Rings is an American sports restaurant franchise based in Cincinnati. It offers a menu of Buffalo wings, burgers, salads, and sandwiches.

== History ==
Founded in Cincinnati in 1984, Wings & Rings was purchased in 2005 by a management team led by Philip Schram, Nader Masadeh, and Haytham David, each of whom took a senior management role with the company.

In 2008, Restaurant Business magazine named the company number one on its Future 50 list of growing chains.

The company has 80 units in the US, the Middle East, and Europe.

== Company leadership ==
Nader Masadeh has been the Chief Executive Officer since 2014, while Philip Schram is Chief Development Officer, and Haytham David as the Chief Executive Officer of International.

Masadeh was featured in the 7th-season premiere of Undercover Boss, which aired Sunday, December 20, 2015, on CBS. For a couple of weeks, CEO Masadeh worked undercover alongside employees, doing everything from washing dishes in a Cincinnati location, to waiting tables in Chicago and prepping meals in Bardstown, Kentucky.

== Awards and recognition ==
- "Best of Fest" award at the 16th annual Chicago Wingfest in 2015
- Number 1 Restaurant Chain for 2008 on the Restaurant Business "Future 50 List"
- "Data Devotee" Award - Fishbowl User Conference
- Ranked in 2018 by Entrepreneur Magazine as #12 in the full-service restaurant category.
