= Salad and Go =

Fast food salad company

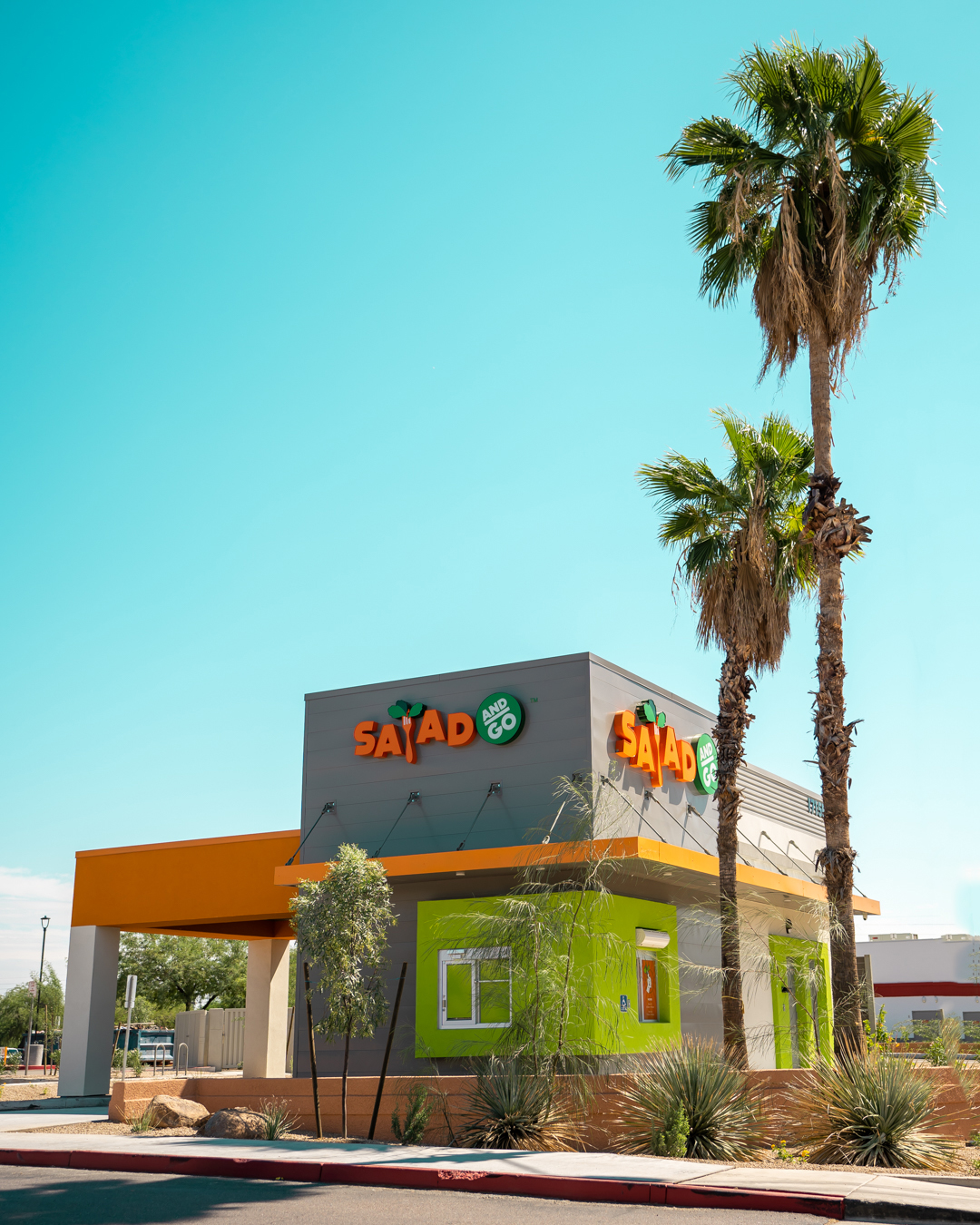
- Salad and Go, drive-through restaurant
- Type: Private
- Industry: Restaurants
- Genre: Fast food
- Founded: 2013 (13 years ago) in Gilbert, Arizona
- Founders: Tony Christofellis; Roushan Christofellis
- Defunct: August 5, 2026; 3 months ago
- Fate: Bankruptcy and closure of the original operator; brand acquired by new owners planning a revival
- Products: Salads, Wraps, soups, Breakfast burritos, lemonades, Iced Teas, Cold brew
- Website: saladandgo.com

Salad and Go was an American drive-through restaurant chain that specialized in salads, wraps, and breakfast. It was a privately held company with more than 70 locations operating across Arizona and Nevada.

After moving its headquarters to Coppell, Texas in 2024, in January 2026, Salad and Go announced it would be relocating back to Arizona, where its headquarters had been previously. In August 2026, the company closed all its remaining locations after filing for Chapter 11 bankruptcy.

The brand featured a variety of fresh items such as salads, wraps, soups, breakfast burritos and bowls, cold brew coffee, and hand-crafted lemonades and iced teas.

== History ==
Salad and Go was founded in 2013 in Gilbert, Arizona by Tony and Roushan Christofellis. The co-founders asked Chef Daniel Patino to help them develop the concept. Chef Patino remains an executive chef for the brand.

In March 2022, industry veteran Charlie Morrison joined Salad and Go as Chief Executive Officer (CEO). Since Morrison joined, the brand has expanded rapidly into major markets including the Dallas–Fort Worth metroplex, Houston, Las Vegas and Oklahoma City while continuing to open locations in its home state of Arizona. Salad and Go was on track to have a total of 135 stores open by the end of 2023. In January 2024, CEO Charlie Morrison said it was on pace to continue to open up a restaurant a week and described his plans for thousands of locations.

On September 19, 2025, Salad and Go closed all stores in Houston, San Antonio, and Austin, along with some in North Texas, with a total of 41 closures. New CEO Mike Tattersfield stated the move was to focus on more disciplined growth.

In January 2026, Salad and Go announced it would be closing all its remaining Texas and Oklahoma locations and focusing on strengthening its operations in Arizona and Nevada. The company also announced it would be relocating its headquarters from Coppell, Texas, back to the Phoenix area. On August 4, 2026, Salad and Go filed for Chapter 11 bankruptcy protection and announced the permanent closure of all remaining locations effective the next day, August 5. As a result, plans for the new headquarters were scrapped. Salad and Go blamed its bankruptcy filing on an ongoing Cyclosporiasis outbreak and stressful cash flow from rent from closed locations, as well as a continued decline in sales. On August 5, all locations were permanently closed. That same day, Dutch Bros. Coffee had reached an agreement to purchase 51 locations in Nevada and Arizona, as well as 14 locations in Texas and Oklahoma for a total of 65 locations to be bought out. These locations were expected to be refurbished and reopened under Dutch Bros. Coffee until 7 Brew outbid Dutch Bros. on September 1. The competitor acquired 73 locations- 35 in Arizona, 19 in Texas, 5 in Nevada and 7 in Oklahoma.

In October 2026, a group comprising Hospitality First Concepts co-founders Mike Myers and Tom Misitano and Salad and Go co-founder and founding chef Daniel Patiño acquired the chain's intellectual property, including its name, trademarks and recipes, through Beyond Salt and Pepper LLC. The group also secured leases for former Salad and Go locations in Gilbert and Mesa, Arizona. The new owners announced plans to reopen locations in Arizona, beginning with Gilbert, and eventually expand the brand through company-operated restaurants and franchising.

== Operations ==
Salad and Go vertically integrated operations and distribution, sourcing ingredients directly from local farmers and suppliers whenever possible. The chain operates two food production facilities–one in Arizona and one in Texas–which prepare produce directly from farms and deliver it to stores. The average Salad and Go store size is approximately 1,000 square feet. This smaller model allows the stores to be built quickly in targeted areas while minimizing costs. Restaurants lack certain features of typical fast-food establishments like freezers, boilers, or fryers that require inspection before opening.

Every Salad and Go store had a drive-through lane and a pickup window for orders placed in the drive-through, online or through the Salad and Go mobile app. The brand offered no on-site dining.

== Menu ==
Salad and Go used fresh natural ingredients. The menu offered eight salads with house-made dressings and a choice of proteins (chicken, steak and tofu). Every salad was available as a wrap. The menu also featured soup and five breakfast burrito options, also available to order as bowls.

== Locations ==
Prior to filing for bankruptcy in August 2026, Salad and Go had more than 70 stores operating across Arizona and Nevada.

== See also ==
- List of salads
- List of fast food restaurant chains
