= Dutch Bros Coffee =

American drive-through coffee chain

Dutch Bros Inc.
- Type: Public
- Traded as: NYSE: BROS (Class A); S&P 400 component
- Industry: Drive-thru restaurants; Restaurants; Retail coffee; Retail beverages
- Founded: February 12, 1992; 34 years ago in Grants Pass, Oregon
- Founders: Dane Boersma; Travis Boersma
- Headquarters: Tempe, Arizona, U.S.
- Number of locations: 1,225 (2026)
- Key people: Travis Boersma (chairman); Christine Barone (CEO)
- Products: Whole bean coffee beverages; Made-to-order beverages; Bottled beverages; Merchandise; Smoothies; Energy drinks
- Revenue: ▲US$1.17 billion (2024)
- Operating income: ▲US$106 million (2024)
- Net income: ▲US$35.3 million (2024)
- Total assets: ▲US$2.50 billion (2024)
- Total equity: ▲US$537 million (2024)
- Number of employees: c. 17,000 (2024)
- Subsidiaries: Dutch Bros Foundation
- Website: dutchbros.com

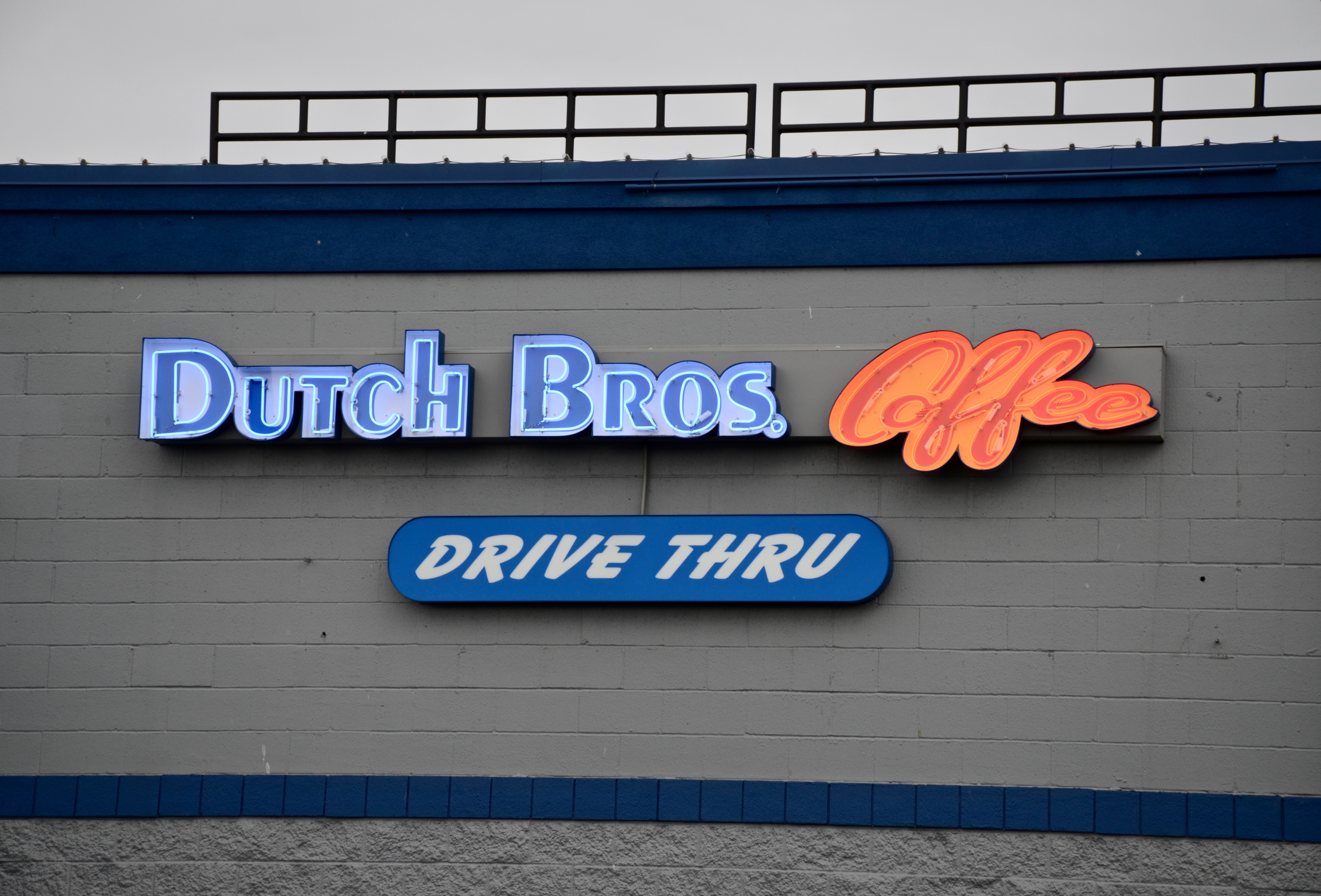
The chain's name in the neon signage of a 2014-opened store.

Dutch Bros Inc., originally written Dutch Bros. (with a period at the end), is a publicly held drive-through coffee chain in the United States. Founded in 1992 by Dane and Travis Boersma, it is headquartered in Tempe, Arizona, after having been based in Grants Pass, Oregon, for many years prior to 2025. It has company-owned and franchise locations primarily located in the Western United States, although the company has expanded as far east as Orlando, Florida.

== History ==
=== Early history ===
Dutch Bros was founded on February 12, 1992, by Dane and Travis Boersma, brothers of Dutch descent, in Grants Pass, Oregon. Their family's third-generation dairy farm had been struggling due to changes in environmental regulations, and the brothers were looking to start a new business. Travis Boersma suggested a coffee cart where they could sell espresso. Dane Boersma was able to help finance the idea with money he had set aside while running a Dairy Queen franchise. They spent an initial US$12,050 (equivalent to $27,646 in 2025) on an espresso machine and a single pushcart, which they set up in downtown Grants Pass. The name Dutch Bros was chosen in honor of their immigrant grandparents.

They soon added four more carts and, by 1994, had established their first drive-through location.

In 1996, the company began roasting its own coffee, sourcing beans from El Salvador, Colombia, and Brazil.

=== Expansion ===
In 1994, Dane and Travis Boersma struck a deal with a customer, Marty McKenna, which allowed him to open his own Dutch Bros in Medford, about 30 miles away from Grants Pass. McKenna's first stand performed so well that he soon opened up a second one across town. In 1997, the Boersmas brought McKenna on as a partner, hoping he would continue to expand the Medford operations. Two years later, they bought out McKenna's stake in the company.

In 1999, Dutch Bros started formally franchising. The company opened its 50th franchised drive-thru location in 2004. That same year, shortly after moving into a new headquarters in Grants Pass, a nearby dumpster fire spread to the building, destroying Dutch Bros roasting equipment, five vehicles, and thousands of pounds of coffee beans. Following this incident, the company continued to expand, and by the end of 2004, operated 61 coffee shops spanning from Northern California to Oregon's Willamette Valley.

By 2009, Dutch Bros was running about 135 coffee stands in seven states and generating $50 million in gross annual revenue. Dane Boersma died in 2009 from amyotrophic lateral sclerosis. In 2013, Travis Boersma was featured on the American version of the television show Undercover Boss. Revenues continued to grow into the mid-2010s. The company earned $238 million in systemwide sales in 2015, $350 million in 2016, and $415.3 million in 2017, when over 283 Dutch Bros locations were operating.

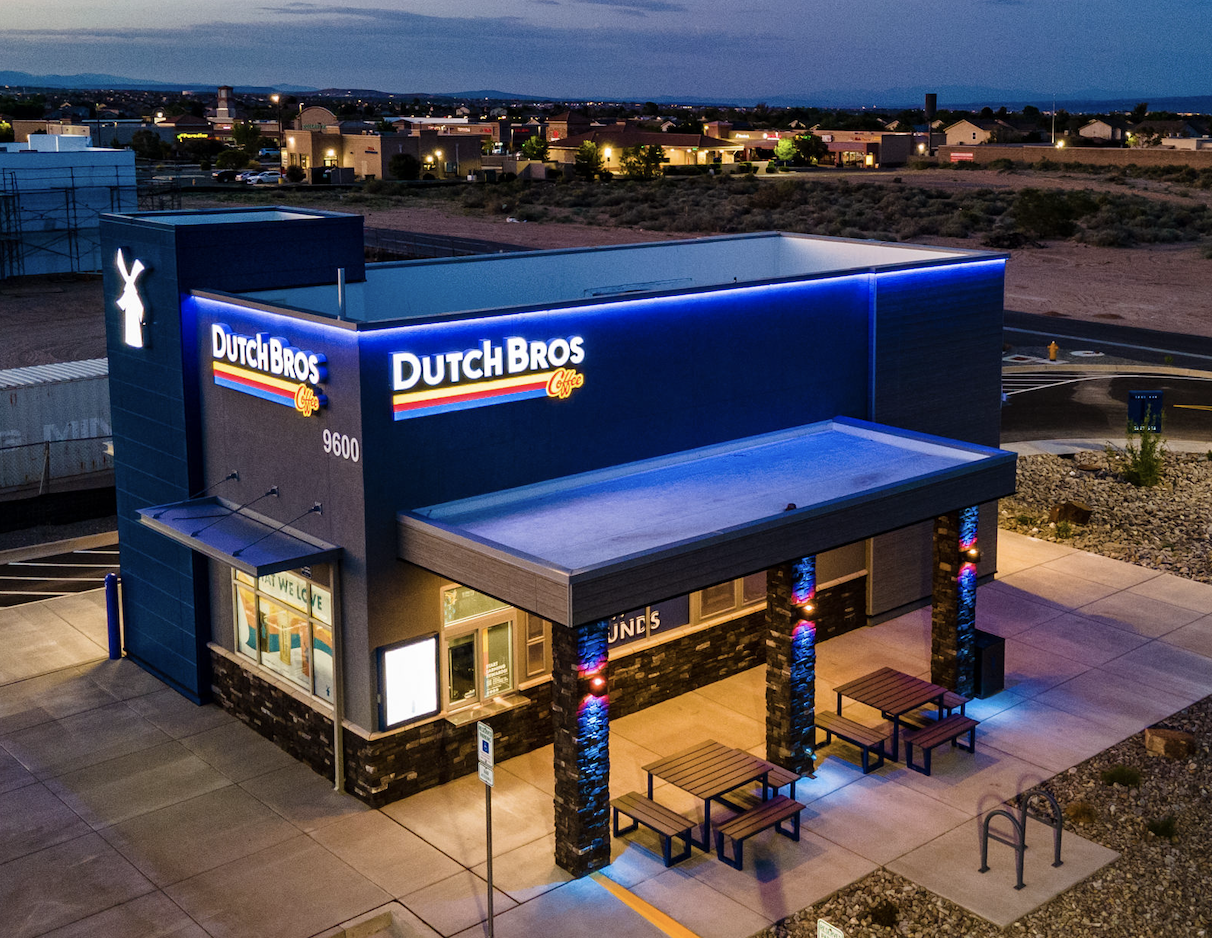
Dutch Bros Coffee in Albuquerque, New Mexico

In January 2017, Dutch Bros purchased a vacant shopping center in downtown Grants Pass, where their original push cart was located. The company converted 20,000 square feet of the shopping center's interior into futsal courts for local youth soccer teams and workout space for its employees. In March of that same year, the company bought the Washington Federal bank building across the street from the shopping center, to move its headquarters and 150 employees into the bank building the following fall.

=== Capital increase and IPO ===
In October 2018, Dutch Bros received an undisclosed amount from private equity firm TSG Consumer Partners for a minority stake in the company and announced plans to expand to 800 stores over the next five years.

Dutch Bros reported revenues of $238 million in 2019, $327.4 million in 2020, and $228 million over the first six months of 2021, heading into the company formally filing for its initial public offering (IPO) in August 2021. The company stated in its filing that it hoped to raise $100 million, which it would use toward paying down $192 million in long-term debt. Dutch Bros held its IPO and began trading on the New York Stock Exchange with the ticker symbol "BROS" on September 15, 2021. The IPO raised $484 million, selling about 21 million shares for $23 each. Travis Boersma retained about 74% of shareholder voting power after the listing, due to his ownership of class B stock before he sold his stake in November 2025.

== Business model ==
Dutch Bros operates as a chain. The vast majority of its stores have no indoor seating and are walk-up or drive-thru stands. Each store sells hot and cold drinks, including non-coffee options (including tea, milkshakes, and sparkling sodas) and a selection of baked goods.

The company started franchising in 1999. In 2008, Dutch Bros transitioned to an internal franchising model that required potential franchisees to have worked for the company for a minimum of three years. This resulted in a 97% continuity rate among franchises; between 2010 and 2015, only 3% of all Dutch Bros franchise locations closed. In 2017, Dutch Bros stopped franchising and started opening only company-owned stores. As of June 2021, franchisees were running 264 Dutch Bros stores and another 207 were fully company-owned. The company has a history of buying out franchisees that failed to meet the company's customer-service standards.

== Operations ==
Dutch Bros is headquartered in Tempe, Arizona. It had been based in Grants Pass, Oregon, since its 1992 founding, but began moving some corporate offices to Arizona in early 2024 and in June 2025 announced that it was relocating its headquarters there. The company is majority-owned by Travis Boersma, who holds the title of executive chairman, and Christine Barone is its president and CEO. In September 2021, Dutch Bros became a publicly traded company, selling 21 million shares for a total of $484 million. As of December 2023, the company employed approximately 24,000 people, and as of August 2024, it had 912 stores. In 2024, Dutch Bros opened a distribution and roasting center in Melissa, Texas. The center is a 65,000-square-foot plant located at the intersection of U.S. 75 and State Highway 121.

In January 2026, it was announced that Dutch Bros had agreed to acquire Clutch Coffee Bar, a regional drive-through coffee chain with 20 locations across North and South Carolina. The financial terms were not disclosed, and Dutch Bros stated that the acquired locations would be closed, renovated, and reopened under its own brand. On August 5, 2026, the company announced it would be acquiring 65 locations from the chain Salad and Go (which permanently closed all its locations the same day) across Arizona, Nevada, Oklahoma and Texas.

== Charity ==
Through its fundraiser "Drink One for Dane", Dutch Bros Coffee donates to the Muscular Dystrophy Association. Its other annual charitable initiatives include Dutch Luv, which benefits local food banks, and Buck for Kids, which supports local youth organizations, including chapters of the Boys & Girls Clubs of America.
