= BrightStar Care =

American home care and assisted living company

Brightstar Care
- Founded: 2002
- Founder: Shelly Sun
- Headquarters: Gurnee, Illinois
- Website: www.brightstarcare.com

BrightStar Care is a US-based home-care franchise company.

== History ==
BrightStar Care founded by Shelly Sun and her husband in 2002, located in Gurnee, Illinois. Shelly Sun is the company’s CEO and Andy Ray is the company's Chief Operating Officer. In 2005, the company began franchising its businesses. BrightStar Care and its CEO were the topic of a 2011 episode of the television series Undercover Boss.

Locations are found in thirty-eight states and Canada. As of 2016, there were about 300 franchise locations. As of 2017, the company employed 100,000 nurses and caregivers. In 2018, there were 329 BrightStar Care locations. That year BrightStar Care also acquired Iowa-based HomeChoice Senior Care. The company provides assisted-living and memory care, in addition to other forms of care, such as ALS care.

== Businesses ==
BrightStar is a source of in-home nurses and care assistance for the elderly, temporarily infirmed, and ill; in addition to physical, speech and occupational therapies for children and others. Franchises are each known by the name “BrightStar Care of”, followed by the location’s city or region of the state. The company also developed the BrightStar Connections program for those suffering from Alzheimer's or Dementia. The company also founded BrightStar Senior Living in 2014, which provides retirement communities in various regions. Each of the locations are owned by an independent franchise operator.

== Legal Issues ==
"BrightStar Care Data Breach Investigation"
"Owners Group Sues BrightStar Care Alleging Unfair Business Practices"
"Staffing Firm to pay $20,000 Over Excluded Individual Allegations"
"BrightStar Franchising, LLC. versus Northern Nevada Care, INC."
"Sexual Assault Lawsuit Filed Against BrightStar Care of SW Pennsylvania"
