= Joel Manby =

American businessman

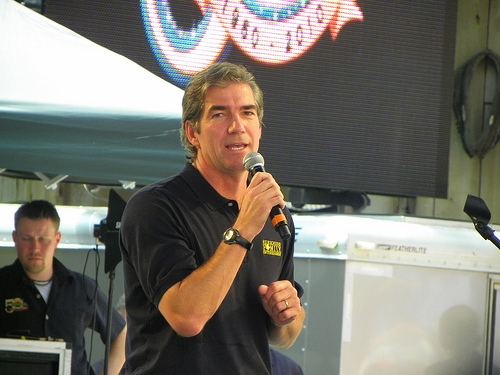
- Photo Courtesy Herschend Family Entertainment
- Occupations: CEO, SeaWorld Parks & Entertainment

Joel Manby is the former CEO of SeaWorld Parks & Entertainment and former president and chief executive officer of Herschend Family Entertainment, the largest family-owned theme park corporation in the United States. HFE creates, develops and operates entertainment, tourism and hospitality properties spanning 26 locations in ten states, including Dollywood and Silver Dollar City. He and his company were featured in the seventh episode of the first season of CBS's Undercover Boss. Manby also wrote Love Works about HFE's unique business culture, with all proceeds going toward the Share It Forward Foundation, the company's charitable organization which aids employees in need.

== Early life ==
Manby was born and raised in Michigan. He attended Battle Creek Lakeview High School and went to college at Albion College. At Albion, Manby graduated with a bachelor's degree in Economics as the valedictorian of his class and was a Rhodes Scholarship Finalist. He was elected to the Albion College Athletic Hall of Fame in 1991.

== Career ==
Upon graduating from Albion, Manby worked at General Motors and received his M.B.A. from Harvard Business School. He was a part of the start-up team for Saturn Corporation and helped launch Saturn's marketing and distribution strategy. After a few years with Saturn, Manby was promoted to CEO of Saab Automobile USA. During his four-year tenure, Saab's sales increased by 67 percent and their J.D. Power Quality Rating jumped from 30th to 5th in the entire industry.

While at Saab, Manby was asked to be on the board for Herschend Family Entertainment. He later became chairman and served as the president and CEO from 2003-2013. Manby is a strong proponent of servant leadership. His role with Herschend Family Entertainment was featured in the CBS program, Undercover Boss.

Manby replaced Jim Atchison, who resigned in December 2014 as president and CEO amid continuing attendance drops at SeaWorld's theme parks, spurred in part by a controversial documentary related to the company's handling of captive orcas. The documentary, Blackfish, explored the conditions of killer whales at SeaWorld, and the company's repeated attempts to hide the aggressiveness of the animals toward the trainers.

On February 27, 2018, SeaWorld Entertainment announced that Manby had resigned; the company named John Reilly as its interim CEO.
