= College Hunks Hauling Junk =

North American junk removal and moving company

College Hunks Hauling Junk and Moving
- Type: Private
- Industry: Junk removal, moving services
- Founded: 2004, in Washington, D.C.
- Founder: Nick Friedman, Omar Soliman
- Headquarters: Tampa, Florida, United States
- Number of locations: 177 franchises (2025)
- Areas served: United States and Canada
- Key people: Nick Friedman; Co-founder; Omar Soliman; Co-founder; Roman Cowan; Brand President; Marc Richard; Chief Operating Officer (COO)
- Website: www.collegehunkshaulingjunk.com

College Hunks Hauling Junk and Moving is a North American junk removal and moving company with headquarters in Tampa, Florida. The company provides junk removal, local and long distance full service moving and office relocation services including in home donation pickup services for non-profit partner organizations. The company became operational in 2005 and began franchising in 2007.

The company's services are available to both commercial and residential clients, with up to 70% of the "junk" collected being donated to charities such as Goodwill Industries, recycled, reused or incinerated as fuel through Reworld. As of 2025, College Hunks Hauling Junk and Moving had four company-owned locations and nearly 200 franchised locations in the United States and Canada.

== History ==
College Hunks Hauling Junk began operations in 2004 after co-founder Omar Soliman won $10,000 in the annual Leigh Rothschild Business Plan Contest. Upon graduating from the University of Miami, Soliman and partner Nick Friedman moved to Washington, D.C., and expanded the company into a full-scale operation. In its first two years, the company hauled away more than 4,000 tons of junk, and as of 2010 was hauling away an average of 10,000 tons each year.

In 2008, the company moved its headquarters to Tampa, Florida and began franchising. The organization expanded and appeared on the Inc magazine's 500 Fastest Growing Companies list in 2009. The company was ranked No. 30 on Entrepreneur Magazine's Top 50 New Franchise Rankings in 2009.

== In mass media ==
In September 2008, Friedman and Soliman tried but failed to secure funding from investors for a new business concept called College Foxes Packing Boxes, a full-service packing and professional organizing company. The company attempted to gain an investment of $250,000 for 25% for the "foxes", on the very first episode of the ABC investment television show Shark Tank. The investors requested equity in College HUNKS Hauling Junk instead, with an offer of $1,000,000 for 10%. The show's investors ultimately rejected the offer, except for Robert Herjavec who offered $250,000 for 50% of the Foxes and 10% of the Hunks, which was later rejected by Soliman and Friedman.

Soliman and Friedman were contestants in the third-season premiere of Bravo TV's Millionaire Matchmaker hosted by Patti Stanger. Friedman and his girlfriend appeared on HGTV's House Hunters, in an episode that aired on July 7, 2013. They have also appeared on Undercover Boss, The Pitch (TV series), Jobs That Don't Suck, and Below Deck.

College Hunks Hauling Junk was one of the first companies involved in a NIL deal, signing an agreement with then University of Miami quarterback D'Eriq King.

== See also ==
- Nick Friedman
- Omar Soliman
