= Omar Soliman =

American entrepreneur (born 1982)

- Born: May 10, 1982 (age 44); Washington D.C., U.S.
- Education: Bachelor of Business Administration
- Alma mater: University of Miami
- Occupations: Founder and CEO of College Hunks Hauling Junk
- Known for: Co-founder and owner College Hunks Hauling Junk

Omar Soliman (born May 10, 1982) is an American entrepreneur who co-founded College Hunks Hauling Junk, a national junk hauling and moving franchise headquartered in Tampa, Florida. He is the co-author of the book Effortless Entrepreneur and the co-executive producer of the 2012 documentary Beware of Mr. Baker, and the executive producer of the 2022 feature film Bezos: The Beginning.

== Early life and education ==
Soliman was born and raised in Washington D.C. He started his marketing, sales, and deliveries career at the age of ten, assisting his mother in her furniture shop. He attended Sidwell Friends School and went on to attend business school at the University of Miami where he received a Bachelor of Business Administration in 2004.

== Business career ==
Soliman founded College Hunks Hauling Junk, named by his mother, with Nick Friedman in 2003 while they were attending college. After working that summer with the business, he returned to the University of Miami for his senior year of college. In 2004, he entered the Leigh Rothschild Entrepreneurship Competition in Miami, a business plan competition. His business plan won first place and an accompanying award of $10,000. A year after graduation, he became a member of the advisory board of Marsh & McLenan, a healthcare research firm in Washington D.C. A short time later he partnered again with Friedman to revive "College Hunks Hauling Junk", then moving furniture under the name "College Hunks Moving."

In 2009, at the age of 27, Soliman was named to the 30 Under 30 List by Inc. Magazine.

Soliman was the co-executive producer of the 2012 documentary Beware of Mr. Baker.

In 2011, Soliman co-authored the book Effortless Entrepreneur with Nick Friedman and Daylle Schwatrz. He was nominated by Ernst & Young for the Entrepreneur of the Year award in 2011.

== Television appearances ==
In 2009, Soliman appeared on the series premier of ABC's television show Shark Tank to pitch a sister concept called College Foxes Packing Boxes. Soliman and Friedman turned down the Sharks offer of $250,000 for a 10% stake in their existing College Hunks business. Soliman turned down the offer received from the Sharks as under the terms of the offer, he and Friedman would have had to turn over partial control of the business.

Soliman appeared on a season premier of the Bravo show Millionaire Matchmaker. He also appeared on AMC's The Pitch in 2013 and on MTV's Jobs That Don't Suck in 2014. He was also on the series premier of CNBC's Blue Collar Millionaires in July 2015.

Soliman has been a guest on the Fox Business Network and MSNBC speaking on the topics of business and entrepreneurship.

== Filmography ==
Year	Title	Role	Category	Credit
2010 - 2011	The Millionaire Matchmaker (16 episodes)	Himself	TV series	
2012	Beware of Mr. Baker		Documentary	Co-executive producer
2013	The Pitch (01 episode)	Himself	Documentary series	
2014	Jobs That Don't Suck (01 episode)	Himself	TV series	
2015	Blue Collar Millionaires (01 episode)	Himself	TV series	
2015	Military Makeover with Montel	Himself	TV series	
2019	Shark Tank (02 episodes)	Himself	TV series	
2021	Wake Up America (01 episode)	Himself	TV series	
2022	Undercover Boss (01 episode)	Himself	TV series	
2023	Bezos: The Beginning		Movie	Executive producer
