= Bethany Mota =

American vlogger (born 1995)

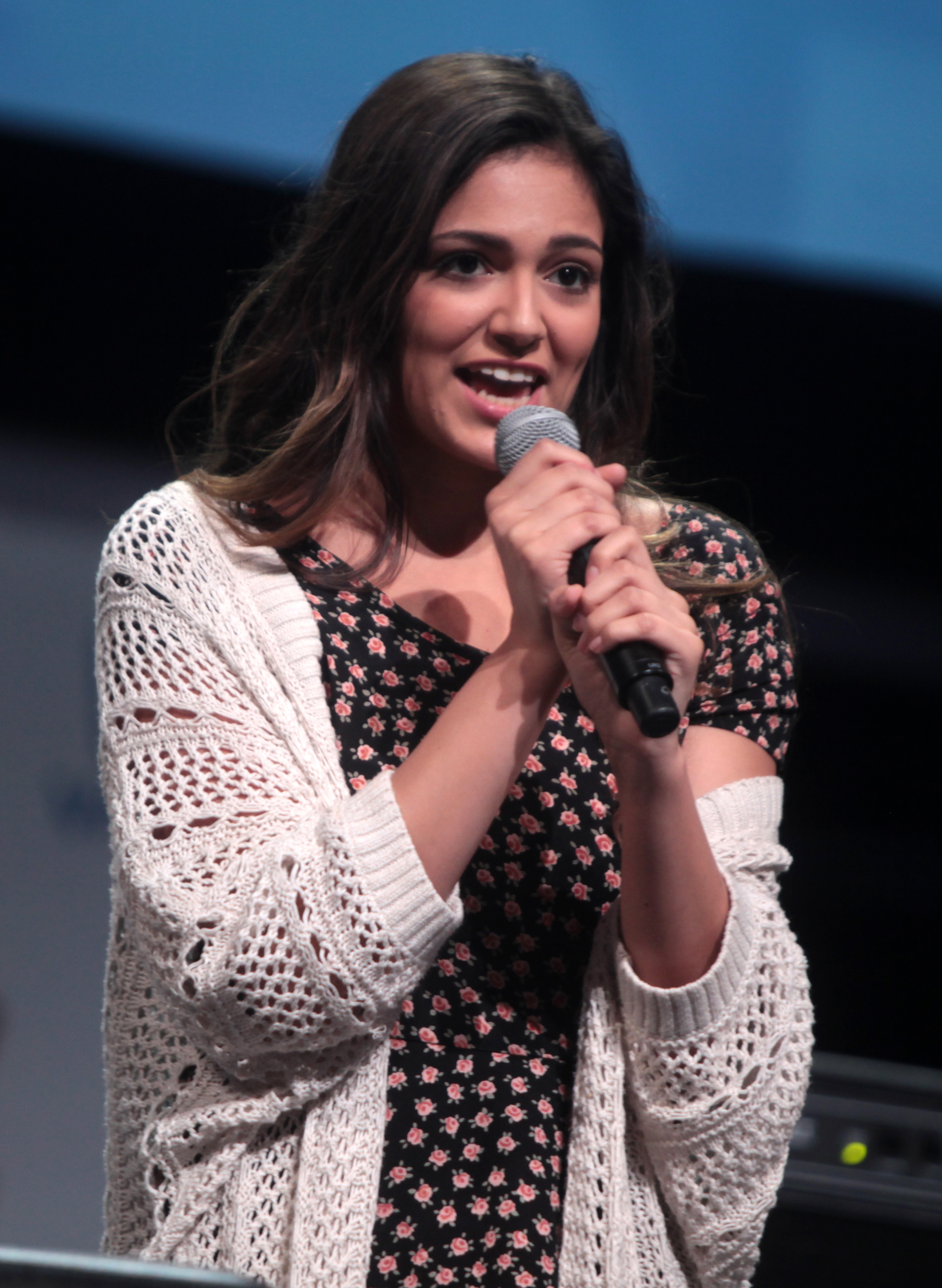
- Mota in 2014
- Born: Bethany Noel Mota; November 7, 1995 (age 31); Merced County, California, U.S.
- Occupations: YouTuber; vlogger; fashion designer; singer; dancer

YouTube information
- Channel: Bethany Mota
- Years active: 2009–present
- Genres: Vlogs; hauls; beauty; DIY; fashion; lifestyle; food
- Subscribers: 9.29 million
- Views: 178 million
- Last updated: August 4, 2026

Bethany Noel Mota (born November 7, 1995) is an American video blogger. Starting with her YouTube channel, Macbarbie07, created in 2009, she rose to fame for her haul videos, in which she shows her fashion and style purchases via the internet. She uploads videos of outfit ideas, makeup and hair tutorials, recipes, and do it yourself ideas. She has since expanded into her own fashion line at Aéropostale. She has gone on multiple tours, which she calls her "Motavatours" to meet and interact with fans. She also appeared on Season 19 of Dancing with the Stars.

== Early life ==
Bethany Noel Mota was born on November 7, 1995, to Tammy and Tony Mota in Merced County, California. Mota is of Mexican and Portuguese descent. She grew up in Los Banos, California and has an older sister named Brittany. She was homeschooled through most of her education but attended public school from third to sixth grade. Mota attended dance and acting classes briefly during sixth grade.

== YouTube career ==
Bethany Mota was one of the most popular YouTube celebrities. Bethany Mota's first haul video was in June 2009. She began her YouTube channel in order to escape from the stress of bullying and rapidly gained followers, which numbered 9.5 million in October 2015. Business Insider described her as "relentlessly upbeat and bouncy" and "a virtuoso of positivity". As hauling became more popular on YouTube, retailers began to use it for marketing, and Mota was offered free cosmetics and gift cards. Mota is ambivalent about promotional videos, but when she does feature free products, she clearly identifies the products that she has not purchased. In January 2014, Business Insider estimated that she made $40,000 a month on her videos.

In order to cultivate her fan following, she purchases prizes and awards to give them to fans who promote her videos. Her fans are called "Mota-vators". Besides her fashion-related videos, she also maintains a more personal account, which she uses to discuss whatever interests her. In 2014, she was selected to be among the content creators in YouTube's first advertising campaign. Mota has also appeared on YouTube's web show IMO, an opinion show aimed at teenagers. She also interviewed President Barack Obama on January 22, 2015, as part of a White House initiative to reach out to a broader audience following his 2015 State of the Union Address.

== Personal life ==
Since April 2017, Mota has been in a relationship with Emmy Award-winning choreographer and fellow YouTuber Dominic Sandoval.

== Fashion career ==
She has partnered with J. C. Penney and Forever 21, and, in December 2013, she launched a clothing, perfume, and accessories line at Aéropostale, over which she retains creative control. She maintains a close relationship with her fans and incorporates their ideas into her fashion design. Teen Vogue called her style "laid-back-but-girly". New announcements are made first to her social media accounts, which Aéropostale credits with increasing interest among teenage girls. The Salt Lake Tribune described this relationship as unique, as both Mota and Aéropostale benefit in prestige from the deal, unlike traditional celebrity endorsements. As of June 2014, the retailer has yet to gain traction from these efforts. Forbes reports that the collection has delivered "high average prices and margins" but still underperformed.

While resting from YouTube, Mota also became the founder and co-designer of Atom&Matter, a line of delicate jewelry meant for everyday use. The brand came to fruition in 2019. The brand's pieces are described by her as a symbol of personal growth and transformation. She believes it can be a good and a new way to reach those audiences who don't watch her or know who she is. "I want this to also appeal to them," she said. In November 2020, she was the subject of a NYT profile, "Can a YouTube Queen Like Bethany Mota Create a Jewelry Realm?" In February 2021, Bloomberg interviewed her for a podcast, "Mota Creates Sustainable Fine Jewelry."

== Music ==
On October 13, 2014, she released a single, "Need You Right Now", with producer-vocalist Mike Tompkins. The song debuted in the Danish top 40 record chart Tracklisten at number thirty. On February 10, 2015, the official music video was released on Tompkin's YouTube channel. On May 4, 2015, in an interview at YouTube's 10th anniversary's YT Fan Meet Up, Mota confirmed she is working on new music and possibly her debut studio album. In June 2015, a video of Bethany Mota singing "Flashlight" on Kurt Hugo Scheneider's YouTube channel was released, which has since amassed over 24 million views. In August 2015, Mota wrote her own song, "Be Who You Wanna Be", and uploaded it on her YouTube channel.

== Other ventures ==
In January 2014, she embarked on a tour called the "Motavatour", across the United States. In March 2014, Mota reported on the Nickelodeon Kids' Choice Awards for Entertainment Tonight. Mota also served as a guest judge in season 13 of Project Runway. On September 4, 2014, Mota was announced as a competitor on the nineteenth season of Dancing with the Stars. She paired with five-time champion Derek Hough. Mota and Hough reached the finals but were eliminated on Night 1, finishing in 4th place. She has also given talks in October 2015 about anti-bullying as part of National Bullying Prevention Month. In 2016, it was announced that Mota would be publishing her first book, a memoir called Make Your Mind Up: My Guide to Finding Your Own Style, Life, and Motavation!. Mota recently joined UNICEF Kid Power as a brand ambassador Kid Power Champion.

=== Dancing with the Stars performances ===
average: 36.27

Week #	Dance / Song	Judges' scores				Result
Week #	Dance / Song	Inaba	Goodman	J. Hough	Tonioli	Result
1	Jive / "Shake It Off"	8	8	8	8	Safe
2	Foxtrot / "All About That Bass"	8	9	8	8	Safe
3	Jazz / "Singin' in the Rain"	10	10^{1}	10	10	Safe
4	Rumba / "Try"	8	9^{2}	8	8	Safe
5^{3}	Hip-Hop / "She Came to Give It to You"	8	8^{4}	8	8	No elimination
6	Tango / "Jealous (I Ain't with It)"	9	9^{5}	9	9	Safe
7	Paso doble / "Run Boy Run"; Team freestyle / "Black Widow"	10; 9	9; 9	10; 9	10; 9	Safe
8	Salsa / "Babalu"; Cha-cha-cha dance-off / "Really Don't Care"	9 Awarded	9; 3	9 extra	10 points	Safe
9	Viennese Waltz / "Say You Love Me"; Trio Argentine tango / "Jungle"	9; 9	9; 10	9; 10	9; 9	Safe
10; Semi-finals	Samba / "I Want You Back"; Contemporary / "I Want You Back" (acoustic version)	9; 10	9; 10	9; 10	9; 10	Safe
11; Finals	Jive / "Shake It Off"; Freestyle / "Revolution (District 78 Remix)"	9; 10	9; 10	9; 10	9; 10	4th place
^{1} Score given by guest judge Kevin Hart in place of Goodman.^{2}The American public scored the dance in place of Goodman with the averaged score being counted alongside the three other judges.^{3}This week only, for "Partner Switch-Up" week, Mota performed with Mark Ballas instead of Hough. Hough performed with Sadie Robertson.^{4}Score given by guest judge Jessie J in place of Goodman.^{5}Score given by guest judge Pitbull in place of Goodman.

== Artistry ==
Her debut single is generally pop and dance music, and has elements of electropop. The follow-up to "I Need You Right Now", is described as an evolution from her first single with a new sound exploring stripped down acoustic music.

== Discography ==
Year	Single	Peak positions	Album
Year	Single	DEN	Album
2014	"Need You Right Now" (feat. Mike Tompkins)	30	

== Filmography ==
Film and television
Year 2036	Title	Role	Notes
2014	Project Runway	Guest judge	Season 13, episode 4
2014	Dancing with the Stars	Contestant on season 19	Finished in 4th place.
2018	Celebrity Undercover Boss	Boss / Expert advisor on Celebrity Undercover Boss	

== Awards and nominations ==
Year	Association	Category	Work	Result
2014	Young Hollywood Awards	Viral Superstar	Herself	Nominated
2014	Teen Choice Awards	Choice Web Star: Female	Herself	Won
2014	Teen Choice Awards	Choice Web Star: Fashion/Beauty	Herself	Nominated
2014	Streamy Awards	Entertainer of the Year	Herself	Nominated
2014	Streamy Awards	Fashion Program	Herself	Won
2015	Teen Choice Awards	Choice Web Star: Female	Herself	Won
2015	Teen Choice Awards	Choice Web Star: Fashion/Beauty	Herself	Nominated
2015	Teen Choice Awards	Choice YouTuber	Herself	Nominated
2016	Teen Choice Awards	Choice Web Star Female	Herself	Nominated
2016	Teen Choice Awards	Choice Web Star: Fashion/Beauty	Herself	Won
2019	Teen Choice Awards	Choice Fashion/Beauty Web Star	Herself	Nominated

Mota was named one of "The 25 Most Influential Teens of 2014" by Time magazine in 2014 and 2015.
