= Nick Friedman =

American businessman

Nick Friedman (born 1981) is an American entrepreneur best known for co-founding College Hunks Hauling Junk and College Hunks Moving with his lifelong friend and business partner, Omar Soliman. He co-authored Effortless Entrepreneur, Work Smart, Play Hard, Make Millions with Soliman. Friedman is also a TV personality, public speaker, and co-executive producer of the documentary Beware of Mr. Baker.

== Early life ==
Friedman grew up in the Washington, D.C., area where he attended the Sidwell Friends School. Following graduation in 2000, he attended Pomona College in California where he played basketball for four years.

== Career ==
After graduating from college, Friedman worked briefly as an economic research analyst for Marsh and McLennan Companies, Inc. In the summer of 2002, before his senior year in college, he joined Omar Soliman in hauling junk in their community to earn extra money. Initially, they hauled junk from houses, offices, and different entities in Omar's mother's cargo van. He quit employment to pursue entrepreneurship at College Hunks Hauling Junk with Omar Soliman, a business they had founded while in college. The term H.U.N.K.S from the name 'College Hunks Hauling Junk', is an acronym for Honest, Uniformed, Nice, Knowledgeable, Service.

== Affiliations ==
Friedman is a board member of the Entrepreneur's Organization (EO) and the Young Presidents' Organization (YPO). He is also a founding member of the Youth Entrepreneur Council.

In 2015, Friedman joined the Florida chapter of YPO and also partnered with a national non-profit organization named 'Feeding Children Everywhere'.

== Awards and recognition ==
In 2008, Friedman was listed by Inc. Magazine as one of the "Top 30 Entrepreneurs Under 30".

Friedman and his partner were among the 2018 winners of the Ernst & Young Entrepreneur of the Year Florida Award.

At the age of 22, Friedman and his friend became the youngest franchisors in the U.S.

== Television ==
Friedman has appeared on the following television programs: ABC's Shark Tank, Bravo's Millionaire Matchmaker, The Nate Berkus Show, FOX Business News, The Dylan Ratigan Show, House Hunters, and Undercover Boss.

== Filmography ==
Title	Year	Role	Reference(s)
The Millionaire Matchmaker	2008	Himself	
Shark Tank	2009	Himself	
Beware of Mr. Baker	2012	Executive producer	
The Pitch	2012	Himself	
House Hunters	2013	Himself	
Below Deck	2013	Himself	
Jobs That Don't Suck	2014	Himself	
Blue Collar Millionaires	2015	Himself	
