= Undercover Boss (American TV series) =

American reality television series

- Genre: Reality
- Created by: Stephen Lambert
- Presented by: Drew Carey
- Narrated by: Mark Keller
- Composers: Jeff Cardoni; David Vanacore
- Country of origin: United States
- Original language: English
- No. of seasons: 11
- No. of episodes: 136 (list of episodes)

Production
- Executive producers: Stephen Lambert; Jack Burgess; Mike Cotton; Rachel Bloomfield
- Camera setup: Multi-camera
- Running time: 42 minutes
- Production company: Studio Lambert

Original release
- Network: CBS
- Release: February 7, 2010 – April 8, 2022

Related
- Undercover Boss

Undercover Boss is an American reality television series, based on the British series of the same name and produced by Studio Lambert in both countries. Each episode depicts a person who has an upper-management position at a major business, deciding to go undercover as an entry-level employee to discover the faults in the company. The first season consisted of nine episodes produced in 2009 and first aired on February 7, 2010, (right after Super Bowl XLIV) on CBS. Companies that appear on the series are assured that the show will not damage their corporate brands.

On April 26, 2018, CBS announced the first-ever Celebrity Edition to premiere on May 11, 2018.

In May 2021, the series was renewed for an eleventh season which premiered on January 7, 2022. In September 2026, CBS announced that they would revive the series for a twelfth season with Drew Carey set to host, becoming the first host in the series history.

== Production ==
The first episode premiered on February 7, 2010, after Super Bowl XLIV, and featured Larry O'Donnell, President and chief operating officer of Waste Management, Inc. The series was a ratings success for the network, with its premiere episode receiving 38.6 million viewers and a share of 32 percent. The first season was the most popular new show in any genre in the 2009–10 television season with an average audience of 17.7 million viewers. Originally, the show was created in response to corporate distrust, as echoed in the introduction of the first two seasons.

On March 9, 2010, CBS announced it had commissioned Undercover Boss for a second season. On July 28, 2010, CBS announced four company executives had signed up for the second season, from NASCAR, DirecTV, Chiquita Brands International, and Great Wolf Lodge, Inc. The second season opener featured the Choice Hotels CEO, Steve Joyce on September 26, 2010. The season two premiere drew 11.02 million, down 27.58 million from the previous season's premiere, and with a 9.55% share, the episode ranked number 2 against its major competition consisting of Sunday Night Football on NBC and Brothers & Sisters on ABC. The second season averaged 12.158 million viewers and the third season, which saw the show move from Sunday to the less popular Friday night, attracted an average of 9.347 million viewers. CBS ordered a fourth season in March 2012 and a fifth season was confirmed in March 2013. The show was renewed for a sixth season on March 13, 2014. A seventh season renewal was announced on May 11, 2015. The show was renewed for an eighth season on May 16, 2016.

The series received Emmy Awards nominations for Outstanding Reality Program in 2010, 2011, 2012, and 2013, winning the category in 2012 and 2013.

Reruns of Undercover Boss have been picked up by TLC and the Oprah Winfrey Network. Broadcasts on TLC began on July 25, 2011, initially Mondays at 8pm ET, later moving to Thursdays at 9pm ET. OWN has also broadcast repeats of Undercover Boss since the fall of 2011. As of 2020, CNBC also continues to broadcast repeats of the show, often on Saturdays.

=== Format ===
Each episode features a high-positioned executive or the owner of a corporation going undercover as an entry-level employee in their own company. The executive changes appearance and assumes an alias and fictional back-story. The fictitious explanation for the accompanying camera crew has changed over the years. To begin with, the person was supposedly part of a competition, and a competitor was shown in clips early in the series but later dropped. In later episodes the idea is that the executive is being filmed as part of a documentary about entry-level workers in a particular industry, usually changing careers. They spend approximately one week undercover, working in various areas of the company's operations, with a different job and in most cases a different location each day. The boss is exposed to a series of predicaments with amusing results and invariably spends time getting to know selected company employees, learning about their professional and personal challenges.

At the end of the undercover week, the boss returns to his or her true identity and calls in the selected employees to the corporate headquarters. The boss rewards hardworking employees through campaign, promotion, material, or financial rewards. Other employees are given training or better working conditions.

The show's producers determine what companies will be featured, what jobs the bosses will do, and which employees and which situations will be shown. The company has no control over what airs, although a promise is made the companies' reputations will not be hurt. Neither the company nor its executive receive money from, or give money to, CBS or the show's producers.

== Episodes ==
Season	Episodes	Originally released	
Season	Episodes	First released	Last released
1	9	February 7, 2010	April 11, 2010
2	22	September 26, 2010	May 1, 2011
3	13	January 15, 2012	May 11, 2012
4	17	November 2, 2012	May 17, 2013
5	15	September 27, 2013	March 14, 2014
6	13	December 14, 2014	February 20, 2015
7	12	December 20, 2015	May 22, 2016
8	10	December 21, 2016	May 19, 2017
9	7	May 11, 2018	June 22, 2018
10	9	January 8, 2020	November 13, 2020
11	9	January 7, 2022	April 8, 2022

== Reception ==
CBS's premiere of Undercover Boss on February 7, 2010, immediately following the network's coverage of Super Bowl XLIV, delivered 38.6 million viewers—the largest audience ever for a new series following the Super Bowl since the advent of people meters in 1987, the largest audience ever to watch the premiere episode of a reality series, the most watched new series premiere overall on television since Dolly on September 27, 1987 (39.47 million), and the third largest post-Super Bowl audience behind Friends Special on January 28, 1996, and Survivor: The Australian Outback on January 28, 2001. As of November 2019, the premiere episode of Undercover Boss remains both as the highest rated and most watched single episode of the 2010s on American television.

=== Broadcast ===
The show is first broadcast on CBS, and reruns are also broadcast on TLC and The Oprah Winfrey Network on Thursdays. In the United Kingdom, the American version aired on Channel 4 (usually on weekday mornings at 11.05 after its fellow American remake Kitchen Nightmares) and in 2020 was found with the Canadian version on British feed of Pluto TV. In the Philippines, the program is aired on CNN Philippines. As of July 3, 2020, the first seven seasons are available on Hulu.

=== Reviews ===
Undercover Boss received mixed reviews; most held good words for the opening episode, but some criticized elements of the show's format. The New York Daily News praised the concept as "simple and brilliant" and "an hour of feel-good television for underappreciated workers." Reviewers with the Chicago Sun-Times and the New York Times complimented the opening episode, although the latter described the ending as "embarrassingly feudal" and had reservations on Waste Management, Inc COO Lawrence O'Donnell III's plan to create a task force to address the problems he found: "Larry's plans to reform his company and humanize the workplace seem great, until he starts to order up committees to study what he has learned. So many good intentions have gone to die in task forces, off-site meetings and mentoring programs." "The show is a welcome change from reality concepts based on humiliating people," concluded the Wall Street Journal. "It is emotionally stirring, with catharsis and messages of virtue rewarded and lessons learned for the betterment of all," said the Baltimore Sun.

The Washington Post, in a negative review, said that Undercover Boss "is a hollow catharsis for a nation already strung out on the futility of resenting those who occupy CEO suites." Entertainment Weekly initially panned it, calling the first episode a "CBS-organized publicity stunt" and "a recruiting tool for a worker uprising," but in another review described the show as "irresistible." The Los Angeles Times believed that it was deriving its idea from Fox's Secret Millionaire (also created by Stephen Lambert) and that it was "cooked" for TV, with the low-level workers being hand-picked, but conceded that the show is "undeniably touching".

Arianna Huffington noted, "In the 19th century, one of the most effective ways to convey the quiet desperation of the working class to a wide audience was via a realistic novel. In 2010, it's through reality TV. And Undercover Boss has clearly touched a nerve with viewers. Last week [February 28 – March 6, 2010], only the Olympics and American Idol scored higher in the ratings."

In a season-end review, The New York Times's chief television critic, Alessandra Stanley, examined the unexpected success of the show and concluded that "it's the humility of the workers, their genuine astonishment and thankfulness over small acts of benevolence, that is most striking. If nothing else, Undercover Boss is a reminder that in bad times, people are less eager to confront or provoke authority; mostly they wish for small favors and the big, serendipitous strokes of luck."

On the tenth anniversary of the show, Alex McLevy of The A.V. Club was severely critical of the show: "Undercover Boss is some of the most blatant propaganda on American television. It's a shameless endorsement of capitalist inequality that may as well end each episode by reminding everyday Americans that they should shut up and be grateful their lives are controlled by such selfless exemplars of virtue. It's class warfare in everything but name."

=== Parodies ===
In 2011, MAD made a parody of Undercover Boss for one of their Christmas episodes, called "Undercover Claus", which shows Santa Claus working undercover as an elf.

In 2015, Key & Peele explored the idea of an employee that bullied the undercover boss, changing his tune after the reveal.

In 2016 and 2020, Saturday Night Live aired sketches that parodied Undercover Boss which featured Adam Driver in character as Kylo Ren, the Supreme Leader of the First Order from the Star Wars sequel trilogy.
