= Janine Allis =

Australian businesswoman (born 1965)

- Born: 1965 (age 60–61); Melbourne, Victoria, Australia
- Occupations: Entrepreneur in retail food and beverage industry
- Years active: 2000–present
- Known for: Founder of Boost Juice
- Board member of: Retail Zoo; Michael Hill Jeweller
- Spouse: Jeff Allis
- Children: 4
- Awards: Awards
- Website: www.janineallis.com.au

Janine Allis (born 1965) is an Australian businesswoman who is the founder of Boost Juice and part-owner of Retail Zoo, which is the parent company of Boost Juice, Salsas Fresh Mex and Betty's Burgers.

Allis started Boost Juice from her home in 2000. The first Boost Juice store was located in Adelaide, South Australia, and the franchise is now in 13 countries.

Apart from her directorship with Retail Zoo, Allis is also a director of Michael Hill Jeweller. She is also the author of the book The Accidental Entrepreneur – The Juicy Bits.

== Career ==
Allis started working at the age of 17 as a media assistant at advertising agency McCann-Erickson. She went on to do modelling as well as working as an assistant gym manager. Her early career also included roles such as a nanny in France, a promotions executive in Portugal as well as a camp counsellor in the USA. Allis has also worked as a stewardess on David Bowie's yacht, a senior manager for a Singapore cinema chain, a publicist for United International Pictures, a publisher, an author, and a touring agent for USA comedians.

Allis has been an independent non-executive director at Kogan since April 2021.

== Retail Zoo ==
After her success in growing her juice business, Allis and her husband decided to diversify their operations by forming a holding company in 2007 called Retail Zoo which they use to acquire and grow other retail food chains.

The first chain that Retail Zoo acquired was the four-outlet Mexican food chain called Salsa's Fresh Mex Grill in 2007. In 2012, Retail Zoo acquired the 20-outlet Cibo Espresso for AU$15 million. In 2014, Retail Zoo started an American-style hamburger diner chain called Betty's Burgers & Concrete Company.

In 2010, the Riverside Company purchased an equity stake in Retail Zoo for an undisclosed amount with Allis remaining in charge. Four years later, Riverside sold their stake to Bain Capital. After the acquisition, Bain owned 70% of the company while Allis owns the rest.

== Television appearances ==
In 2010, Allis participated in the Channel Ten TV show Undercover Boss. Allis appeared as a "shark" on the Australian version of the TV show Shark Tank.

In 2019, Allis competed in the sixth season of Australian Survivor. She was eliminated on day 44 and finished in sixth place. She returned to the show representing Australia on the Australia V The World season of Australian Survivor. She made it to the finale with fellow Australian Luke Toki but lost the jury vote to American representative Parvati Shallow.

In 2021, Allis appeared as a boardroom advisor for the fifth season of The Celebrity Apprentice Australia. In 2022, Allis returned to The Celebrity Apprentice Australia as Lord Sugar's boardroom advisor.

On 26 March 2024, Gordon Ramsay's Food Stars premiered on Channel 9 in Australia where Allis and celebrity chef and television personality Gordon Ramsay go head to head in a show where contestants pitch their food or drink related item, for a $250,000 investment from both Allis and Ramsay.

== Awards ==
- 2015 Franchise Hall of Fame Inductee – MYOB FCA Excellence in Franchising Awards
- 2015 The Australia Awards for Excellence in Women's Leadership: Victoria.
- 2015 InStyle and Audi Women of Style Awards; Business Award
- 2012 Australian Export Heroes Award
- 2010 Franchise Council of Australia International Franchise Award
- 2004 Telstra Australian Business Woman of the Year
