= Betty's Burgers =

Australian burger chain

Betty’s Burgers & Concrete Co.

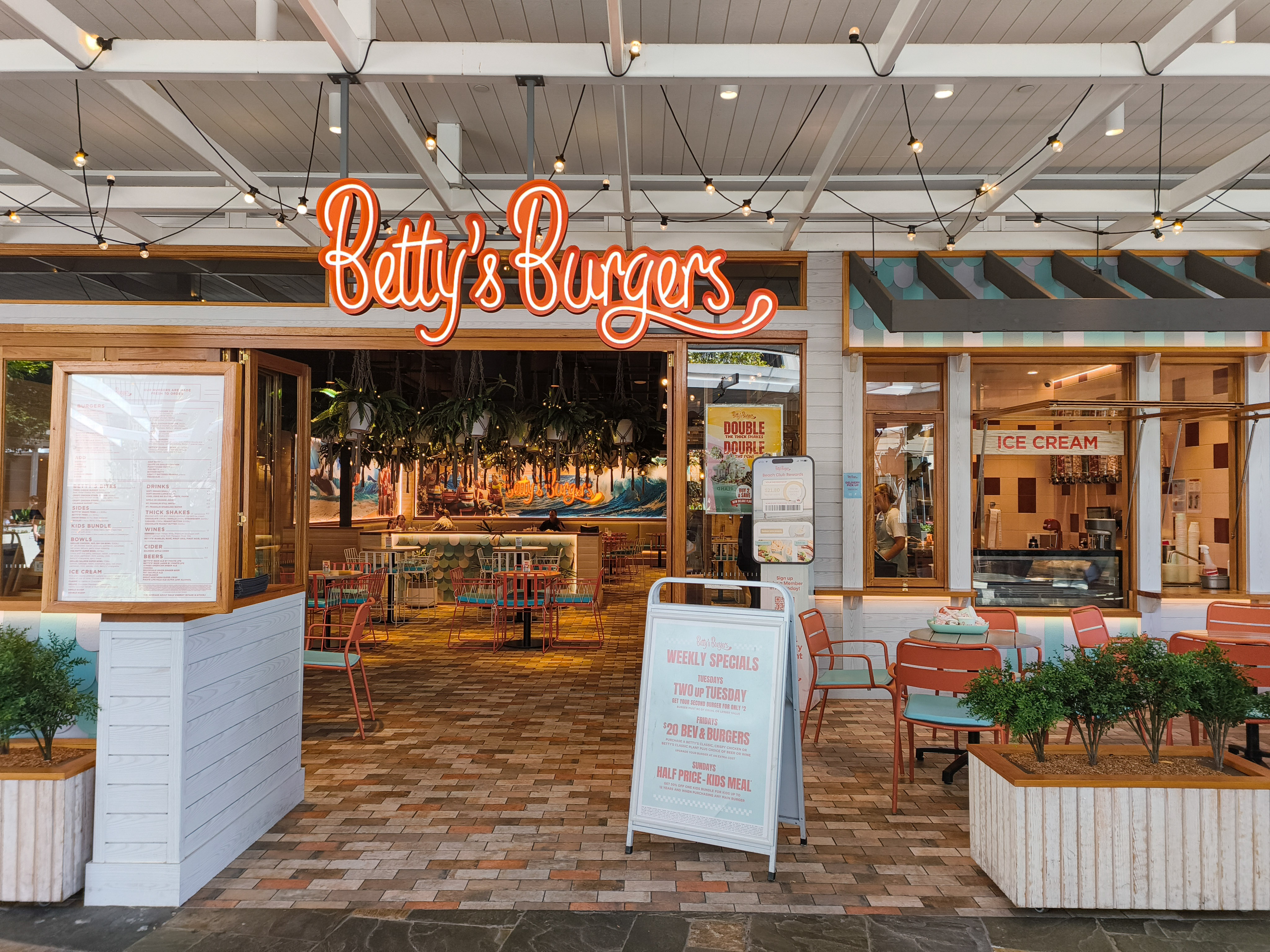
- Betty's Burgers restaurant at Westfield Whitford City
- Type: Subsidiary
- Industry: Fast food
- Founded: 2014; 12 years ago, in Noosa, Queensland
- Founder: David Hales, Nik Rollison and Michael Tripp
- Headquarters: Clayton, Victoria, Australia
- Number of locations: 74 (February 2026)
- Area served: Australia
- Key people: Chris Garlick (CEO); Joanne Bradley (Managing director)
- Products: Hamburgers, chips
- Revenue: A$113.4 million (2022)
- Parent: Retail Zoo
- Website: www.bettysburgers.com.au

Betty's Burgers & Concrete Co. is an Australian fast food and casual dining burger restaurant chain owned by parent company Retail Zoo. Betty's Burgers was formed in 2014 with its first store located in Noosa, Queensland. The company is currently under rapid expansion. As of February 2026, there are 74 restaurants located throughout all states of mainland Australia and the Australian Capital Territory.

== History ==
The chain was founded in 2014 in Noosa, Queensland by three entrepreneurs David Hales, Nik Rollison and Michael Tripp after they saw an opening in the Sunshine Coast's dining market. The restaurant had a franchisor request on the first day of operation.

In 2017, the restaurant was acquired by Retail Zoo, the same parent company as Boost Juice. Retail Zoo aimed to open 12 to 15 restaurants each year until it reached about 150 restaurants Australia-wide, which was twice its then-current presence, to compete in the A$9 billion burger market.

During the 2021 Mansfield earthquake, one of its restaurants located on Chapel Street, Melbourne suffered severe damage, which caused the outlet to suspend business for two months while repair works took place.

== See also ==
- List of hamburger restaurants
- List of restaurant chains in Australia
- Janine Allis, part-owner of Retail Zoo
