= List of restaurant chains in Australia =

This is a list of notable restaurant chains in Australia. A restaurant chain is a set of related restaurants with the same name in many different locations that are either under shared corporate ownership (e.g., McDonald's in the U.S.) or franchising agreements. Typically, the restaurants within a chain are built to a standard format through architectural prototype development and offer a standard menu and/or services.

== Restaurant chains in Australia ==
- Bakers Delight – Australian bakery chain franchise
- Baskin-Robbins Australia – US international ice cream parlor chain
- Belles Hot Chicken
- Betty's Burgers – Australian burger chain
- Breadtop – Australian bakery chain
- Brumby's Bakeries – Chain of retail bakeries
- Bucking Bull – Australian restaurant chain
- Burger Urge – Australian restaurant chain
- Carl's Jr – American multinational fast food chain
- Chargrill Charlie's – Australian restaurant
- Chicken Treat – Australian fast food restaurant chain
- Cibo Espresso – Adelaide, South Australia coffee franchise
- The Coffee Club – Australian café chain
- Cold Rock Ice Creamery – Australian-owned ice cream parlour chain
- Crust Pizza – Australian franchising company
- Domino's – Australian franchise of Domino's Pizza
- Donut King – Australian restaurant franchise
- El Jannah – Australian Lebanese fast food restaurant chain
- Gloria Jean's Coffees – American-Australian retail coffeehouse chain
- Grill'd – Australian multinational casual dining restaurant chain
- Guzman y Gomez – Australian dining and fast-food chain
- Hog's Breath Cafe – Australian restaurant chain
- Hudsons Coffee – Australian coffee retailer chain
- Hungry Jack's – Australian fast food franchise
- Jamaica Blue – International coffeehouse chain
- KFC – American fast food restaurant chain
- Krispy Kreme – US-based doughnut company and coffeehouse chain
- Lone Star Steakhouse & Saloon – Casual dining restaurant chain
- Mad Mex (Australia) – Mexican fast-food restaurant chain
- McDonald's Australia – American multinational fast-food chain
- Michel's Patisserie – Australian café chain
- Miss Maud – Australian café and hospitality business
- Muffin Break – International cafe franchise
- Muzz Buzz – Coffee chain founded in Perth, Western Australia
- Nando's – South African flame-grilled chicken chain
- Nene Chicken – South Korean fried chicken restaurant franchise
- Noodle Box – Australian company
- Oporto – Australian fast food restaurant
- Outback Steakhouse – American chain steakhouse
- Pancake Parlour – Australian restaurant chain
- Pepper Lunch – Japanese restaurant chain
- Pie Face – Australian fast food chain
- Pizza Capers – Australian pizza chain
- Pizza Hut – American multinational restaurant chain
- La Porchetta – Italian restaurant franchise in Australia and New Zealand
- Red Rooster – Australian fast food restaurant
- Salsa's Fresh Mex Grill – Tex-Mex restaurant chain in Australia
- Schnitz – Australian food franchise
- Shingle Inn – Bakery chain headquartered in Brisbane, Australia
- Spudbar – Australian baked potato restaurant chain
- Starbucks – American multinational coffeehouse chain
- Subway – American fast food chain
- Taco Bell – American fast-food chain
- Taco Bill – Australian restaurant chain
- Vittoria Coffee – Australian coffee company
- Wahlburgers – American burger restaurant chain
- Wendy's Milk Bar – Australian ice cream parlour franchise
- Zambrero – Australian multinational fast-food franchise serving Mexican cuisine
- Zarraffas Coffee – Australian coffeehouse chain
- Zeus Street Greek – Australian fast food chain
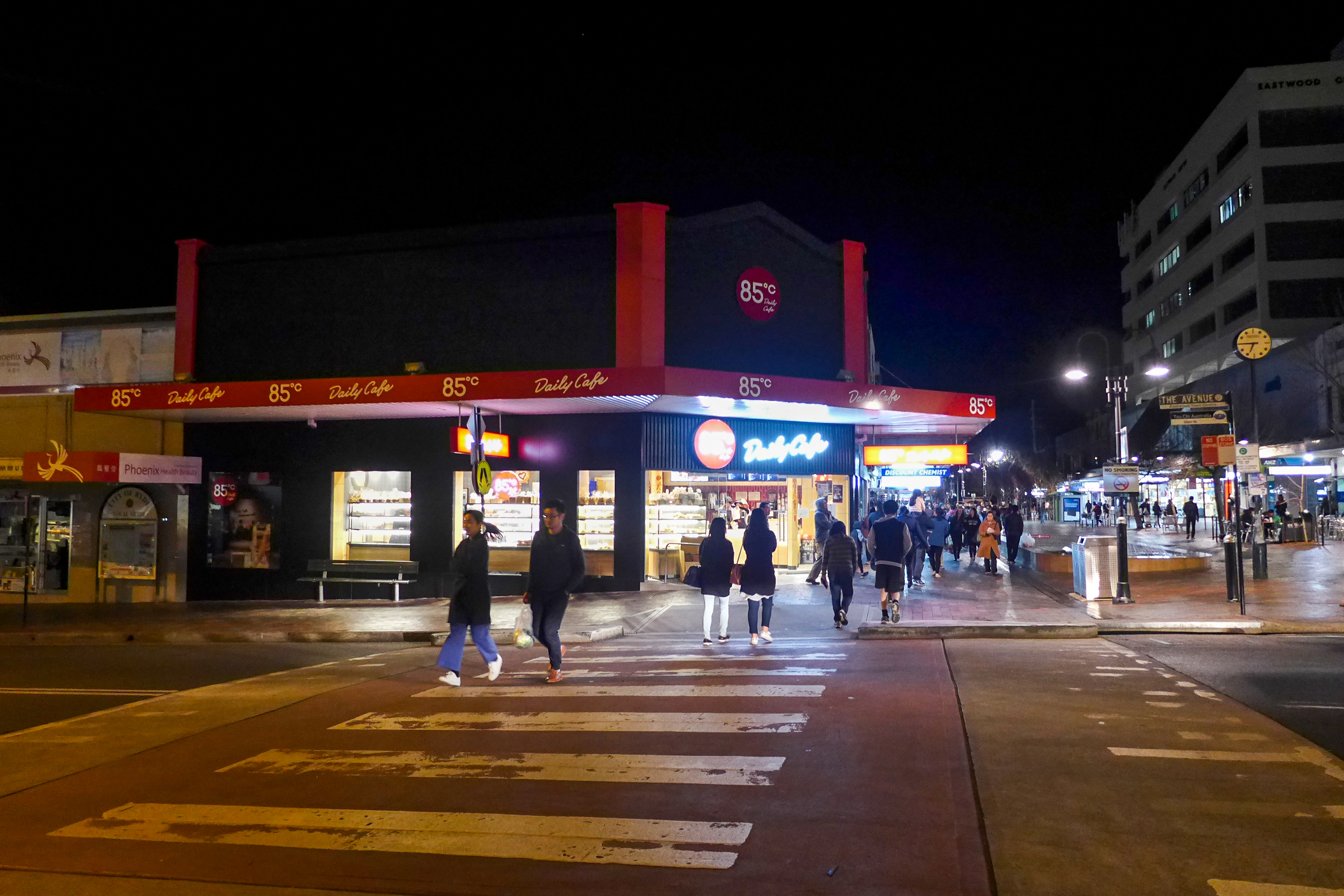
A 85C Bakery Cafe location in Sydney

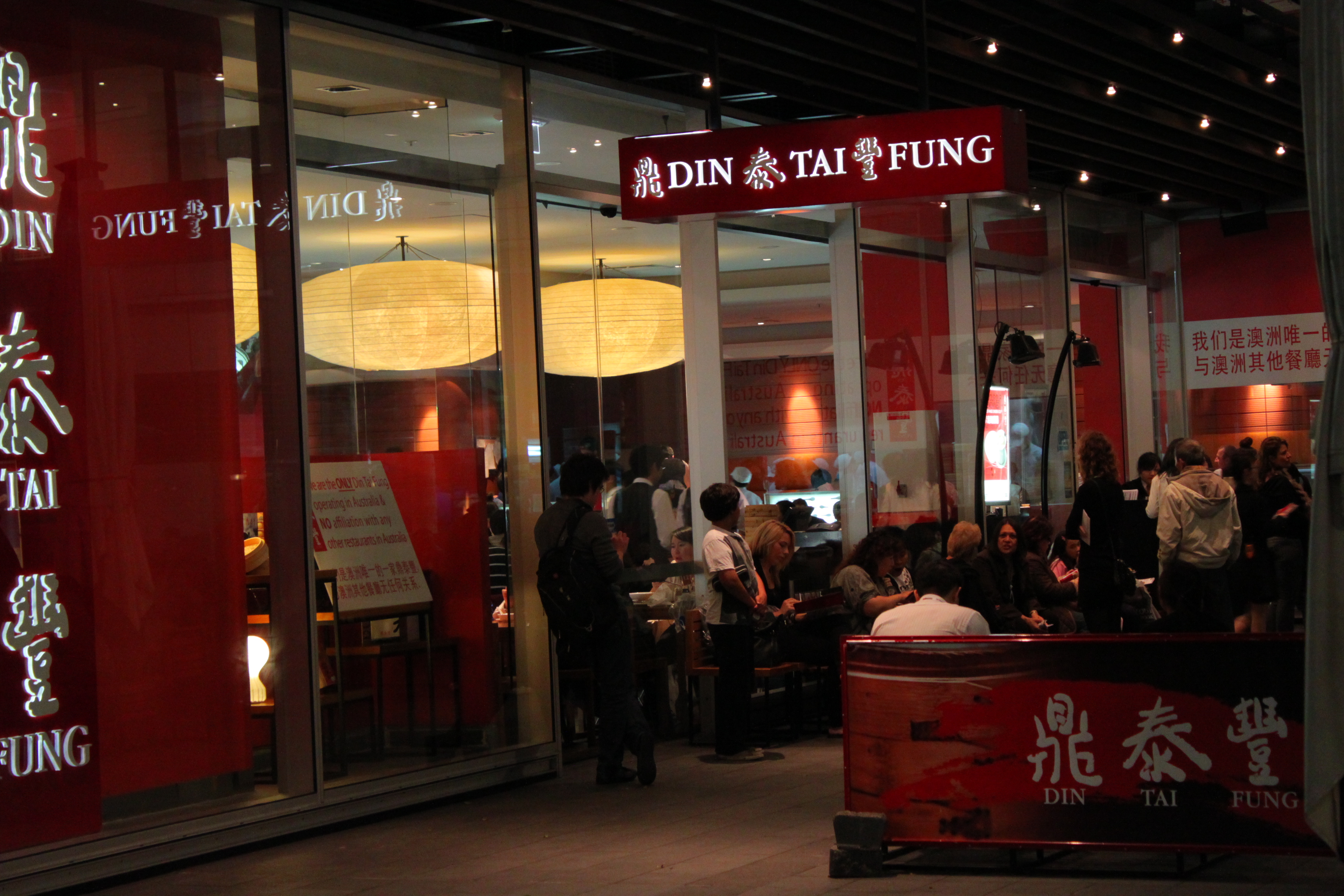
A former Din Tai Fung restaurant in Sydney

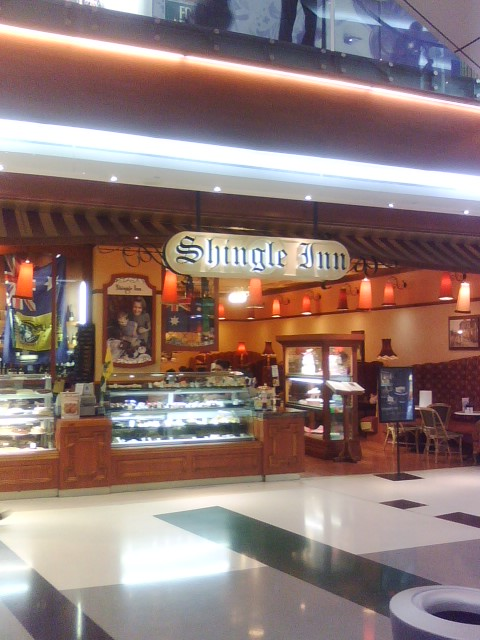
A Shingle Inn location at MacArthur Central, Brisbane

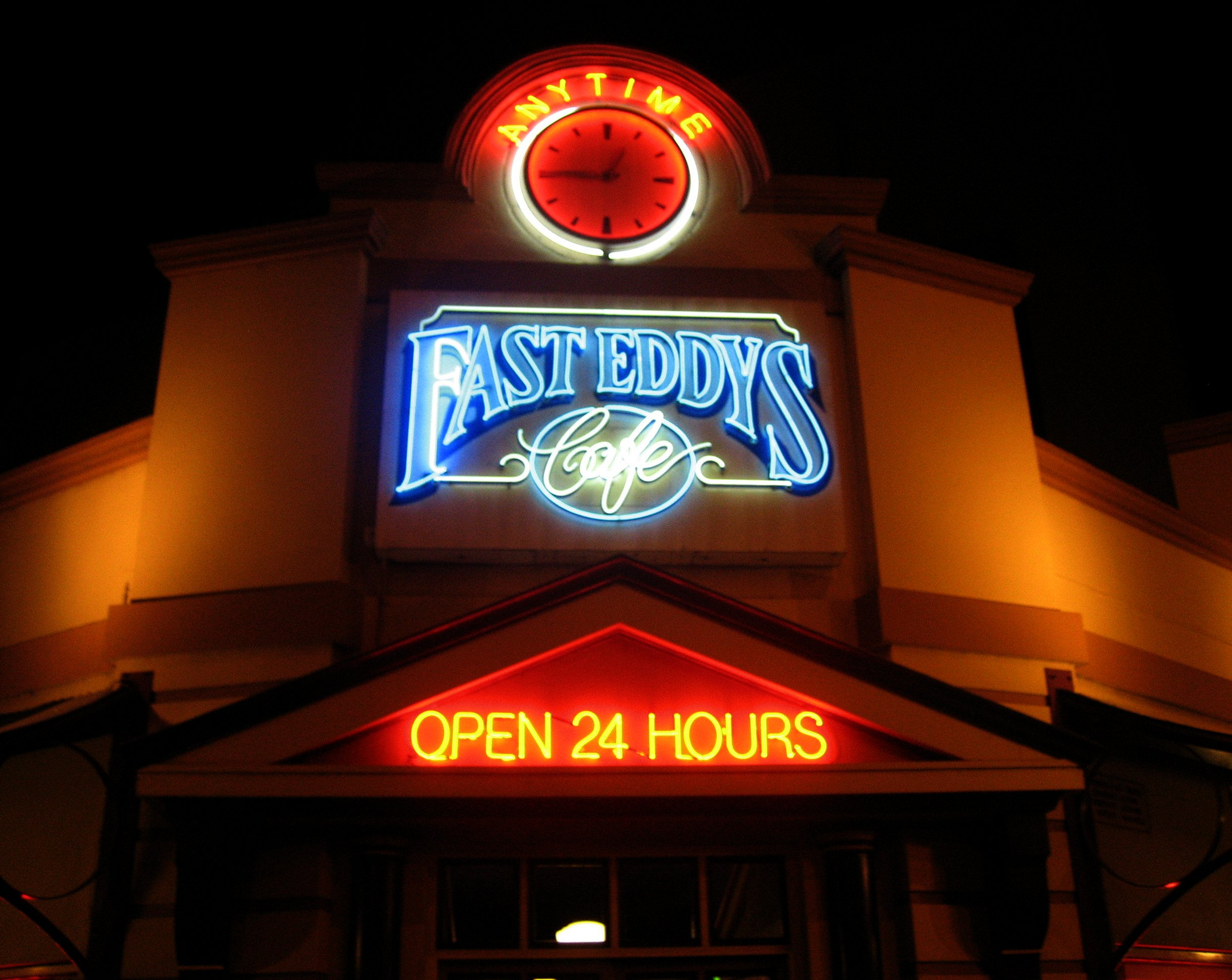
A Fast Eddys location in the Perth CBD

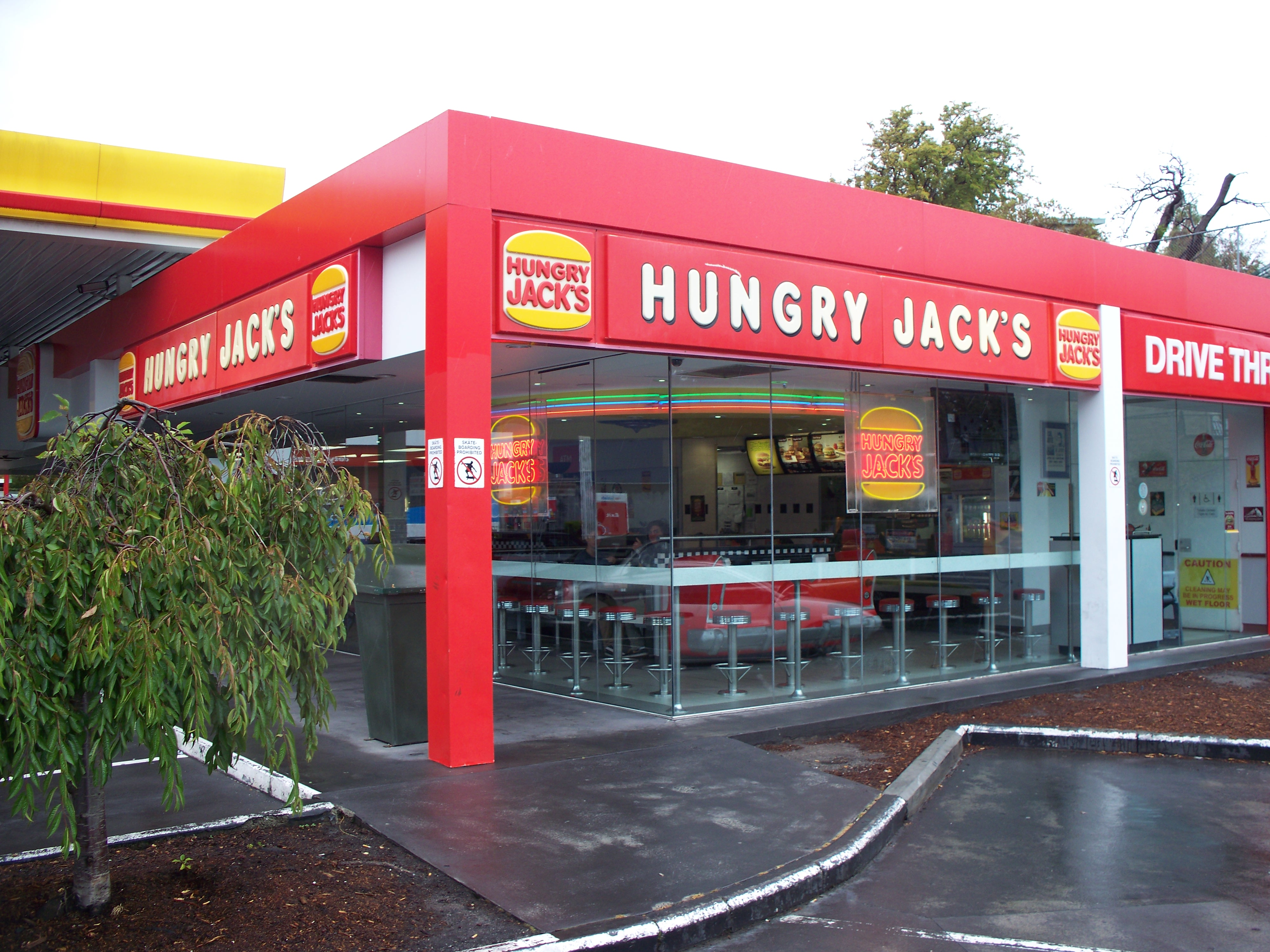
A Hungry Jack's/Coles Express/Shell outlet in Elizabeth Street, Hobart

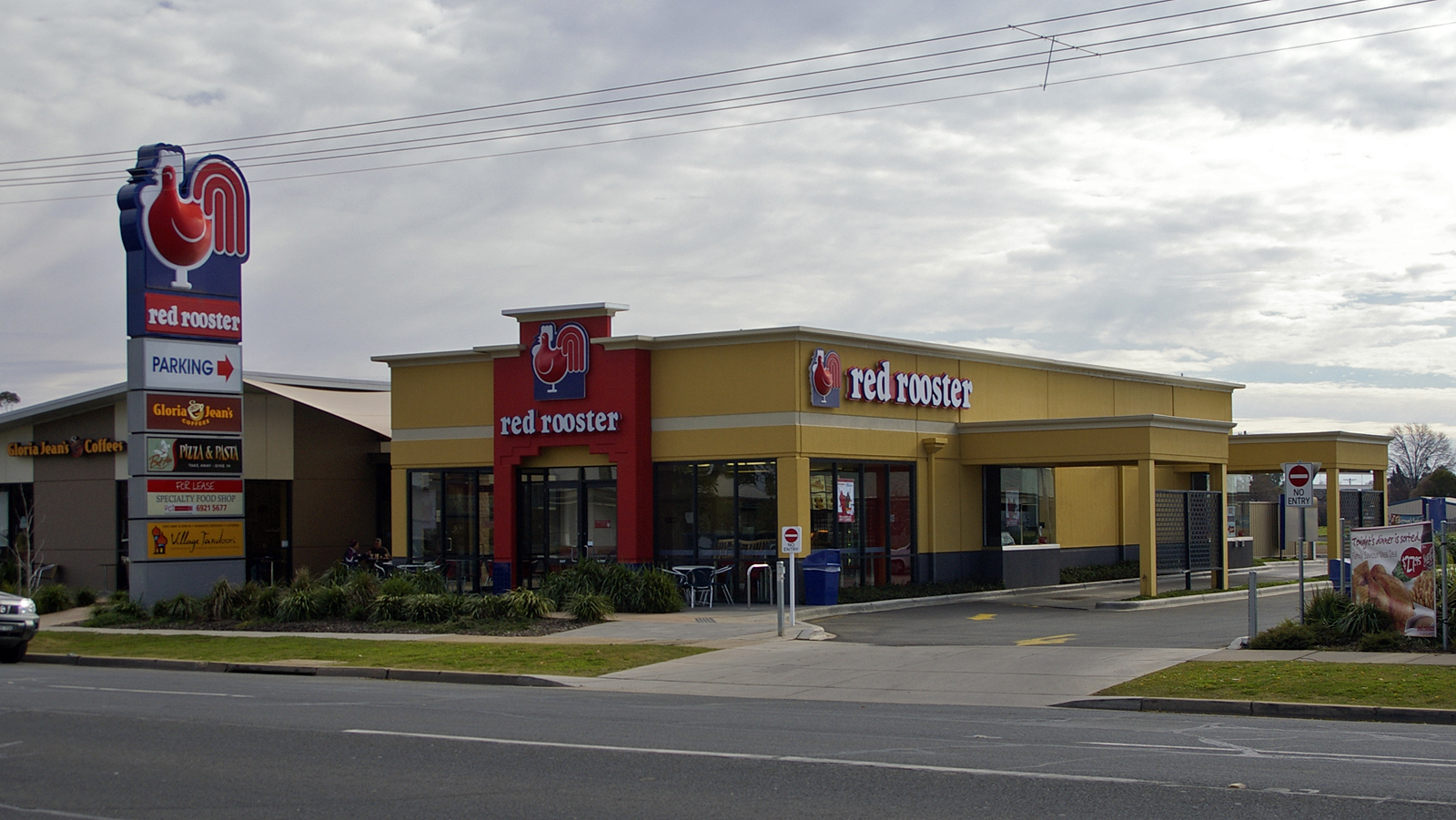
A Red Rooster restaurant in Wagga Wagga

== See also ==
- List of fast food restaurant chains
- List of Michelin-starred restaurants in South Australia
- List of pizzerias in Australia
- List of restaurant chains
- Lists of restaurants
- Outline of Australia
