= Jamaica Blue =

International coffeehouse chain

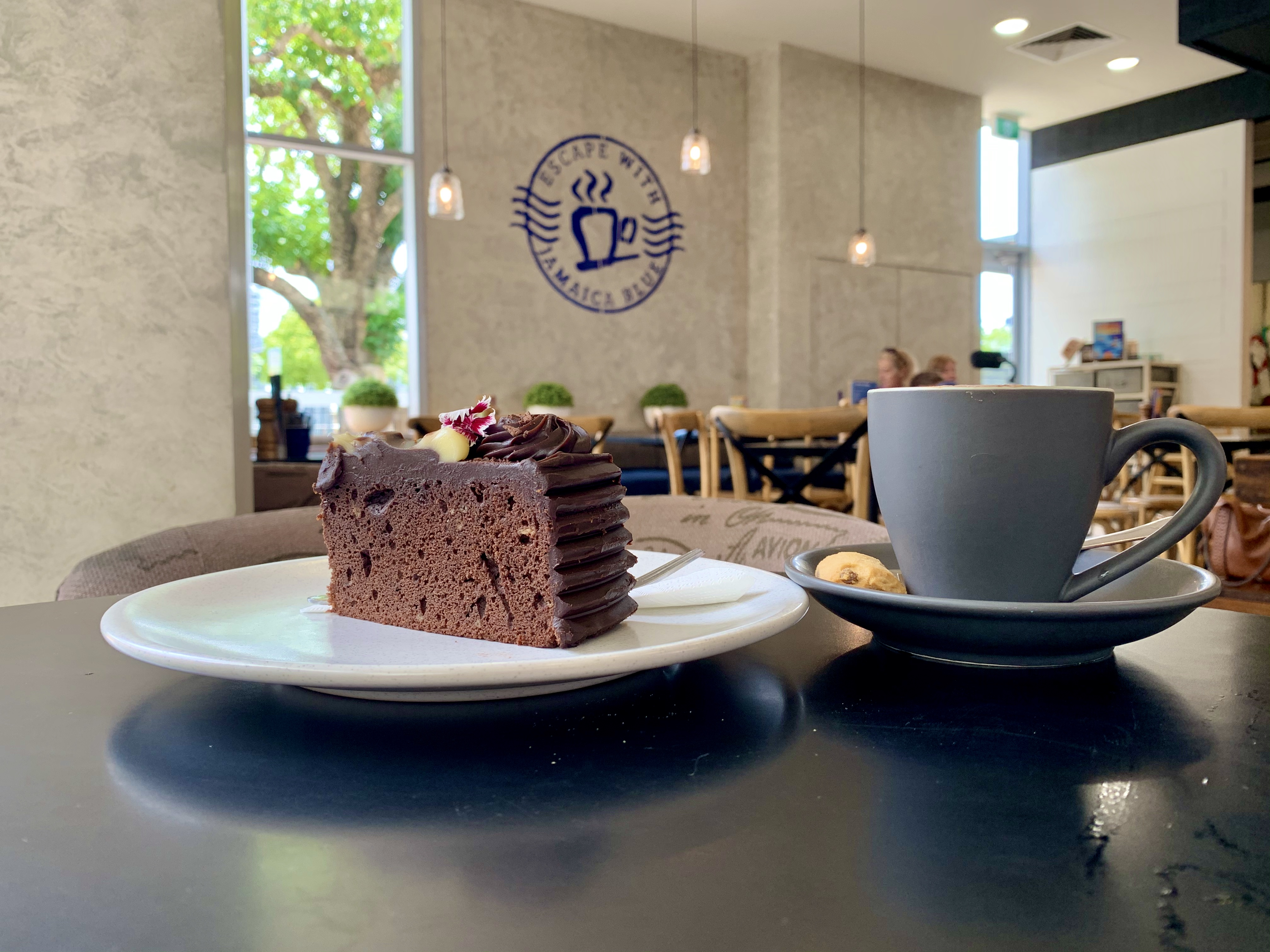
- Jamaica Blue chocolate cake serving, 2020
- Product type: Coffee
- Current owner: Foodco Group Pty Ltd
- Country: Australia
- Markets: Australia, New Zealand, United Kingdom, Malaysia, Singapore, China, United Arab Emirates
- Website: www.jamaicablue.com.au

Jamaica Blue is a franchise business of Foodco Group Pty Ltd which operates small coffee shops throughout Australia, New Zealand, the United Kingdom, China, and the United Arab Emirates. The company mainly operates businesses in residential areas, malls, airports, hospitals and high streets. Jamaica Blue operates around 171 cafés in 5 countries.

== History ==
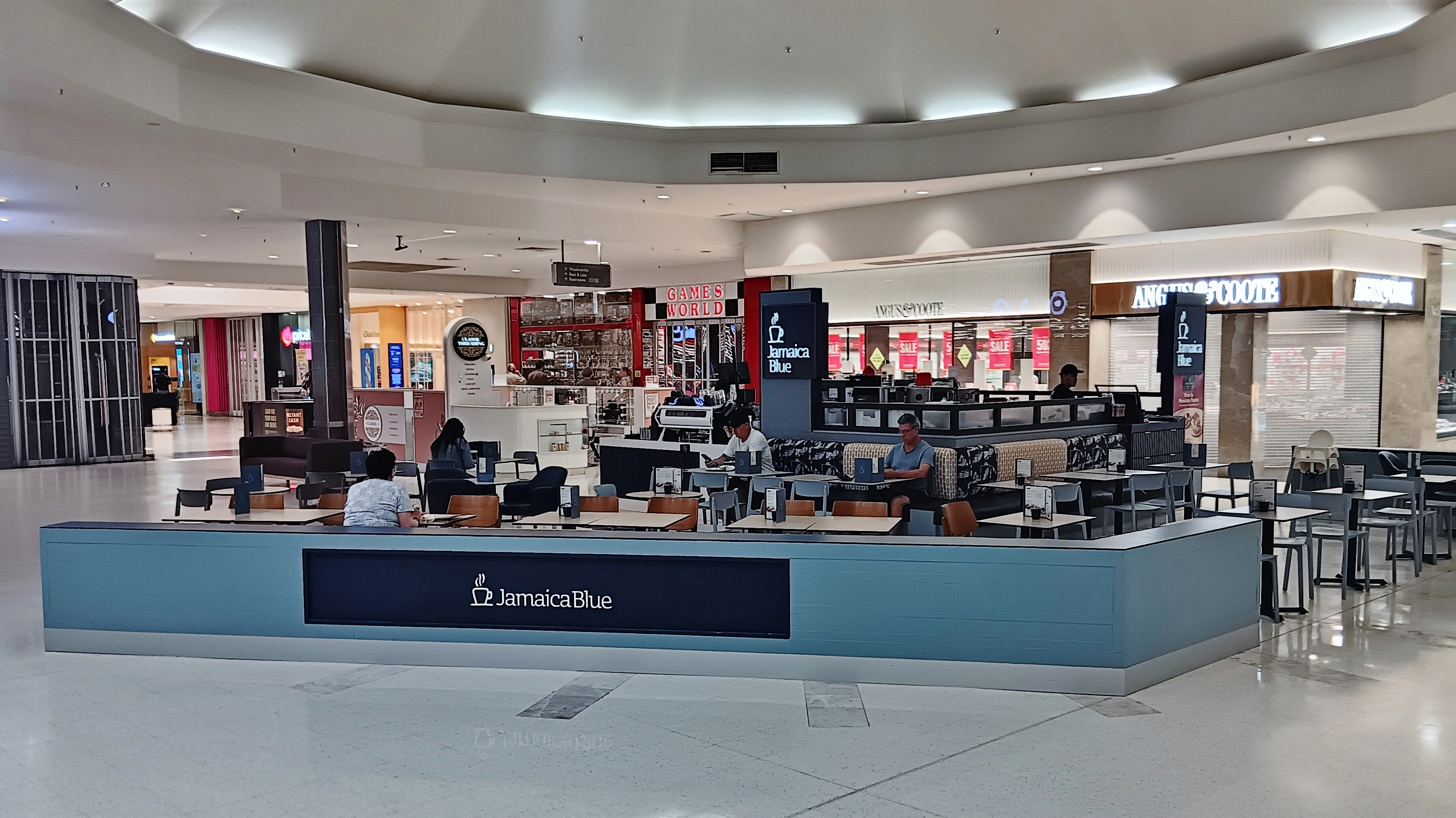
Westfield Carousel location

In 2012, the first Jamaica Blue cafe opened in Singapore. In that same year the cafe celebrated its 20th anniversary. It opened its 100th store in Australia on 16 October 2014, in Westfield Miranda. Jamaica Blue is the sister company of Muffin Break, which is also a franchise of Foodco Group Pty Ltd.

In 2020, Jamaica Blue together with their sister company, Muffin Break, raised over $90,000 to assist those affected by the devastating bushfires within Australia by donating to the Australian Red Cross Bush Fire Appeal.

== Memory cafes ==
The City of Wanneroo, working with Alzheimer's Western Australia, Jamaica Blue and Ocean Keys Shopping Centre, opened a memory cafe at the end of September 2020.

“Memory cafes help reduce stigma and promote a society that enables and supports people living with dementia to remain active in the community rather than be confined within the four walls of their home,” said Alzheimer's WA chief executive, Maria Davison.

== Controversies ==
In November 2020, former journalist and Labor candidate Ali France alleged that the Jamaica Blue Indooroopilly store appeared to discriminate against her due to her disabilities and had security escort her from the premises. After publicly discussing the incident on International Day of Persons with Disabilities, it gained significant national media coverage. The next day, the company issued an unreserved apology on behalf of Jamaica Blue and the franchisee, and expressed deep disappointment at France's treatment.

== See also ==
- List of coffeehouse chains
- List of restaurant chains in Australia
