= Bucking Bull =

Australian restaurant chain

- Company type: Subsidiary and franchise system
- Industry: Restaurant
- Founded: 1999; 27 years ago, Western Australia
- Headquarters: Brisbane
- Number of locations: 10 (2025)
- Products: Coffee, soft drinks, Roast & Grill
- Owner: Aktiv Brands
- Website: www.buckingbull.net

Bucking Bull is an Australian chain of roast and grill restaurants. It was founded in 1999 in Western Australia by franchise group Aktiv Brands. Later it expanded to Queensland, New South Wales, and Victoria. In 2015 there were 35 Bucking Bull outlets. Bucking Bull places great emphasis on growing all of the products it sells in Australia. He has also mastered Beef, Pork and Lamb meat products.

== See also ==
- List of restaurant chains in Australia
