= Salsas Fresh Mex =

Tex-Mex restaurant chain in Australia

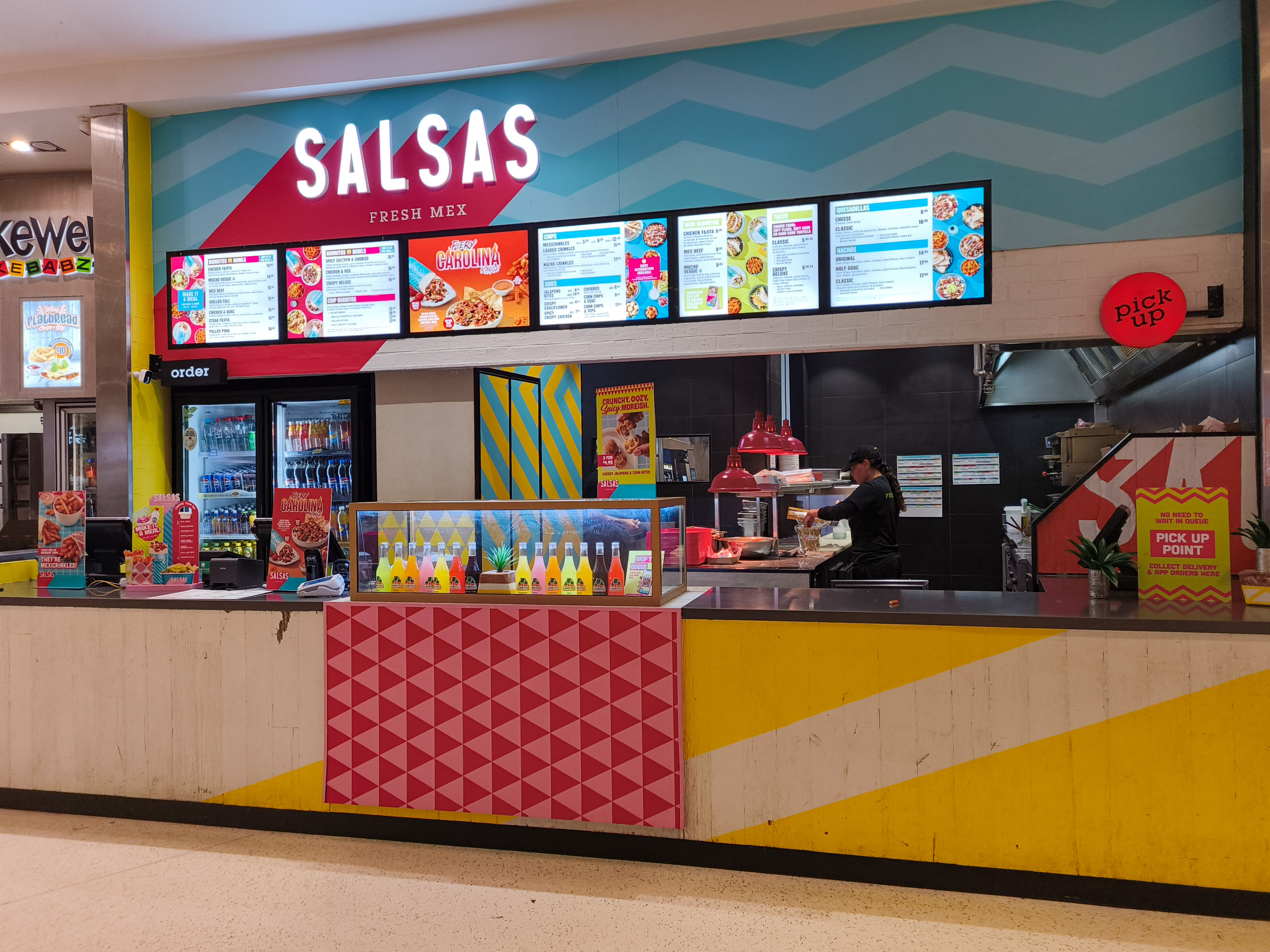
- Salsas Fresh Mex store in Cockburn Gateway
- Company type: Subsidiary
- Industry: Fast food
- Founded: 21 March 2007; 19 years ago in Sydney
- Number of locations: About 42
- Area served: Australia
- Key people: Janine Allis
- Products: Tacos, burritos, and other Tex-Mex cuisine-related fast food
- Parent: Retail Zoo
- Website: salsas.com.au

Salsas Fresh Mex is an Australian chain of fast-food restaurants. It serves a variety of Tex-Mex foods including tacos, burritos, quesadillas, nachos, other specialty items, and a variety of "value menu" items.

Salsas was founded by Lawrence Di Tomasso (now owner of Laurie Dee's), it was sold in 2009 to Retail Zoo.

There are 42 locations in operation across Australia.

== See also ==
- List of restaurants in Australia
- List of Mexican restaurants
