= Mad Mex (Australia) =

Mexican fast-food restaurant chain

Mad Mex Fresh Mexican Grill
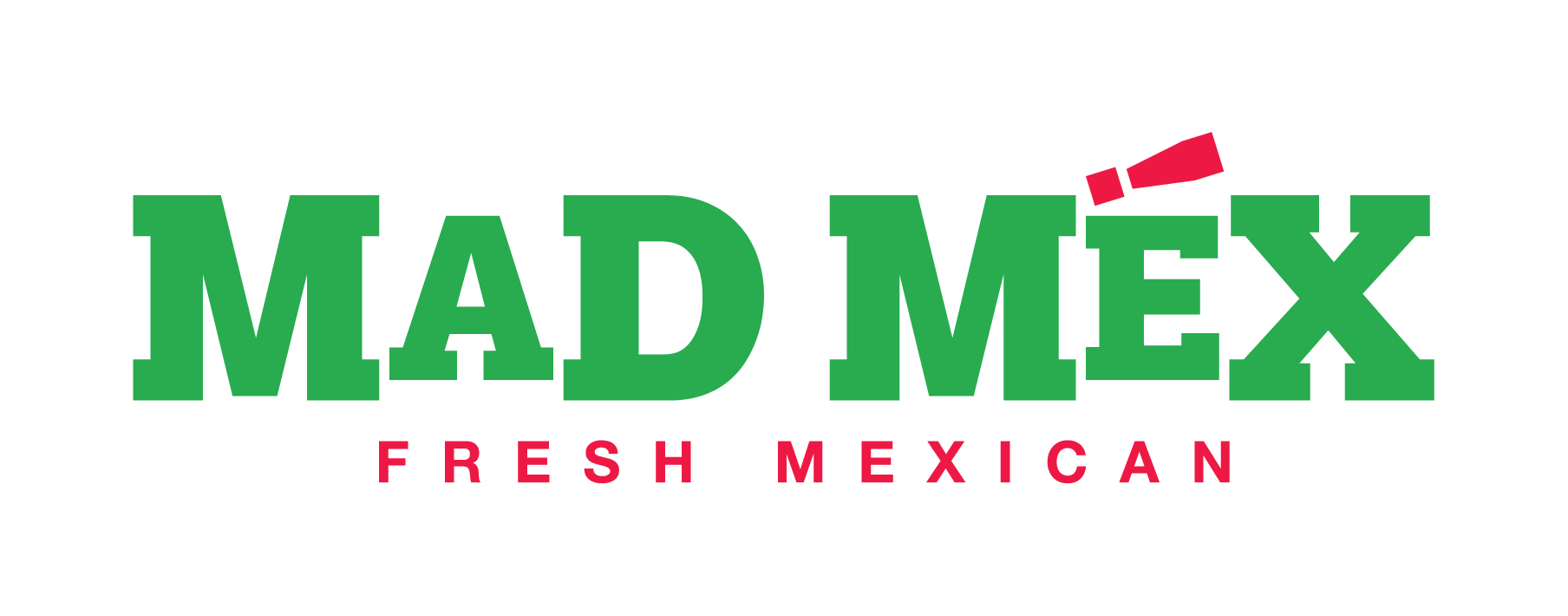

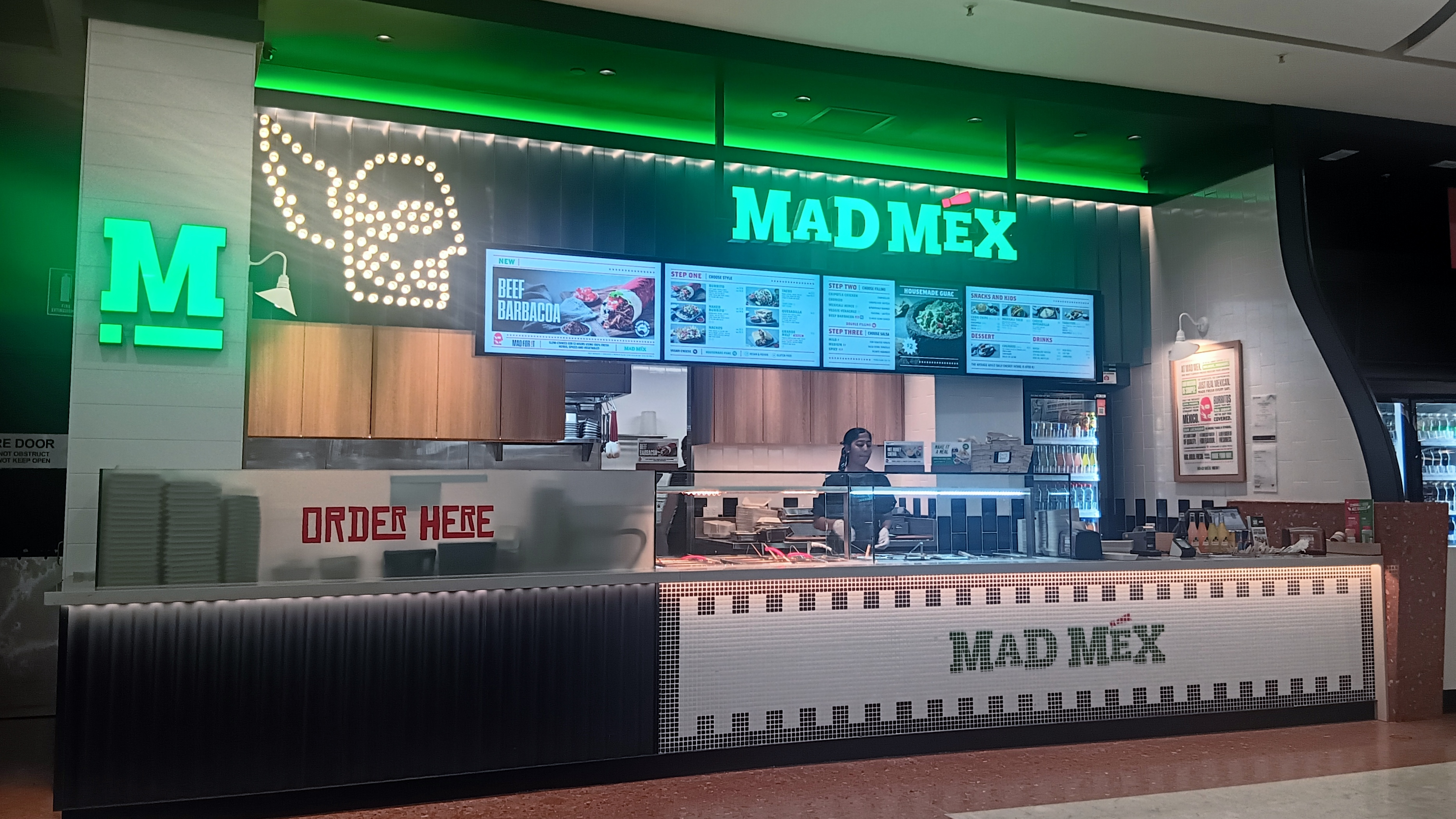
- Location in Westfield Carousel
- Industry: Restaurant
- Founded: 21 March 2007; 19 years ago
- Founder: Clovis Young
- Headquarters: Sydney, Australia
- Area served: Australia; Singapore; Malaysia
- Products: Tacos, burritos, and other Mexican-related fast food
- Website: Official website

Mad Mex Fresh Mexican Grill, referred to simply as Mad Mex, is a multinational chain of fast-food restaurants based in Sydney, Australia, that purveys Mexican cuisine. Stores are decorated after Lucha libre, and as of late 2022, 71 were in operation.

Mad Mex was founded by Clovis Young, a Californian who immigrated to Australia in 2006 and opened the first Mad Mex outlet in 2007.

In the early 2010s, a company named Mad Group was appointed as the master franchisee of the Mad Mex chain for New Zealand. The first Mad Mex outlet in that country was opened in 2013. By 2015, Mad Group was operating six Mad Mex outlets in New Zealand. That year, the company launched an equity crowdfunding campaign aiming to raise NZ$1.5 million in growth capital, mainly to finance opening new outlets. The campaign did not raise the NZ$750,000 initially sought, but a second campaign aiming to raise NZ$500,000 was successful.

In September 2019, 4Fingers Crispy Chicken announced its acquisition of a 50% stake in Mad Mex. As part of the partnership, 4Fingers opened Mad Mex's first stores in Asia; these being in Singapore and Malaysia in 2019. The company bought out 4Fingers in 2021. During 2023, all of the Mad Mex outlets in New Zealand were closed after several holding companies went into liquidation.

== See also ==
- List of restaurant chains in Australia
- List of Mexican restaurants
