= Muzz Buzz =

Coffee chain founded in Perth, Western Australia

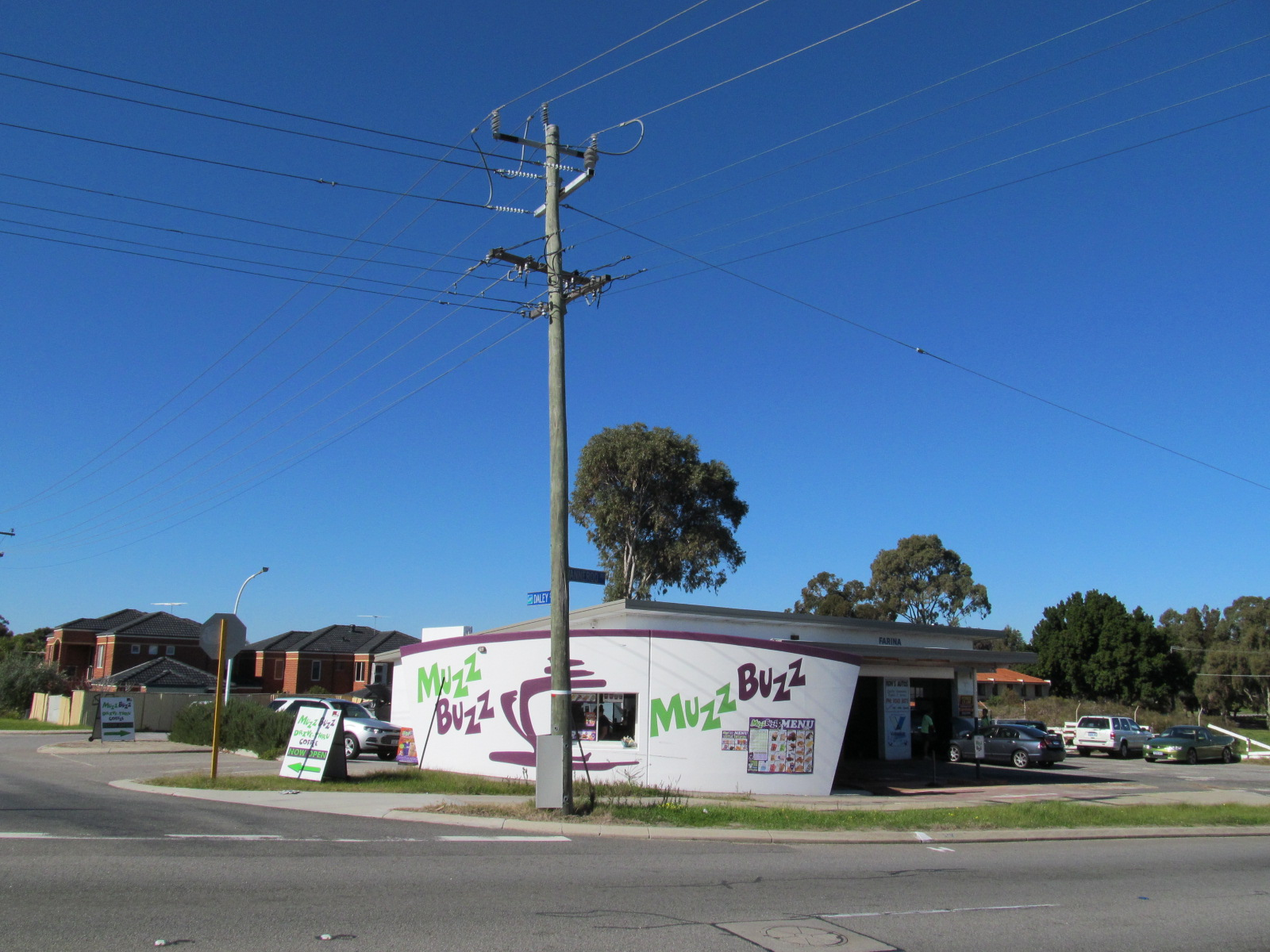
- A Muzz Buzz outlet in Yokine, Western Australia, July 2012
- Type: Private
- Industry: Drive-through coffee stores Retail coffee and tea Retail beverages
- Founded: Belmont, Perth, Western Australia (2001)
- Headquarters: Belmont, Western Australia, Australia
- Key people: Craig Muzeroll (founder); Warren Reynolds (former Executive Chairman); Joyce Reynolds (CEO)
- Products: Whole bean coffee Tea; Made-to-order beverages Bottled beverages Baked goods Frappuccino beverages
- Services: Coffee
- Number of employees: Over 100
- Website: www.muzzbuzz.com

Muzz Buzz is an Australian owned and operated drive-through coffee franchise chain, originating in Perth, Western Australia. Established in 2001 in the suburb of Belmont, Muzz Buzz has since expanded to over 30 locations within Western Australia, and has made forays interstate and overseas.

== History ==
Craig Muzeroll opened the first Muzz Buzz in 2001 on Great Eastern Highway, Belmont, Western Australia. The coffee shop was created to cater to growing Australian tastes for premium coffee which, at the time, was not commonly available within Perth in drive-through form.

Franchising of the brand commenced in 2004 after Warren Reynolds and his partners purchased Craig Muzeroll's business. The first franchised outlet was established in Mosman Park. Reynolds was instrumental in the expansion of the franchise to additional Perth locations. Sporting a distinctive design reminiscent of an oversized coffee cup, the stores have the standard corporate livery of white, green, and purple. As a member of the Franchise Council of Australia, it was ranked as one of the top 10 franchises within Australia in 2012, based on an independent review of franchisors by 10 Thousand Feet. In 2016, it began a co-branding agreement with fellow Western Australian business Java Juice, and began selling Java Juice's products in its outlets.

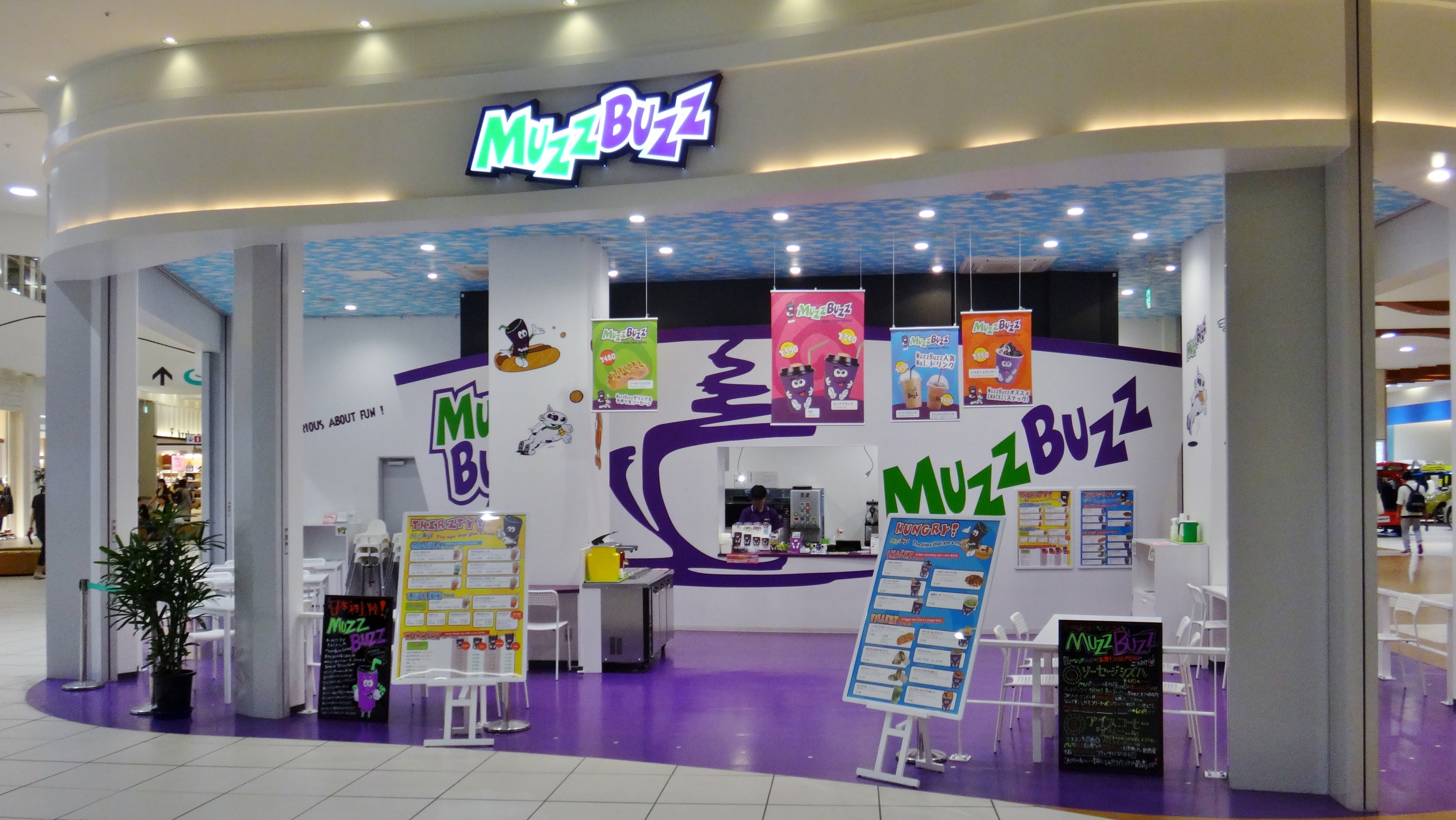
A Muzz Buzz outlet in Japan, inside the Aeon LakeTown shopping mall in Saitama Prefecture, September 2015

Expansion into non-Western Australian markets began in 2006, with potential sites earmarked in New South Wales, South Australia, Queensland and Victoria. Expanding internationally, Muzz Buzz opened its first New Zealand outlet in 2012. Muzz Buzz opened its first location in Japan in 2015. Franchise rights were also sold to Belarus for the Eastern Bloc, Turkey and the Middle East, South Africa, the United Kingdom, and Singapore, with interest expressed for future North American based operations. Additionally, Reynolds has mentioned in interviews that the company has received expressions of interest from China.

In 2016, Muzz Buzz had 53 locations in Australia, and 7 locations across Japan, New Zealand and Russia. However, as of 2026, Muzz Buzz stores only operate in Western Australia.

== Controversy ==
An advertisement by Muzz Buzz in 2016 had received complaints from viewers who pointed out that it "promot[ed] paedophilia and abusive behaviour". The advertisement shows a man pouring juice over a young boy, wiping it off with his finger, licking his finger and saying "delicious sticky boy". The ad was criticised as “violent, messy, and disgusting”. In response, Muzz Buzz removed the advertisement from all broadcasts and apologised to the public for “any distress caused”.

== See also ==
- List of coffeehouse chains
- List of restaurant chains in Australia
