= Breadtop =

Australian bakery chain

Breadtop Pty Ltd

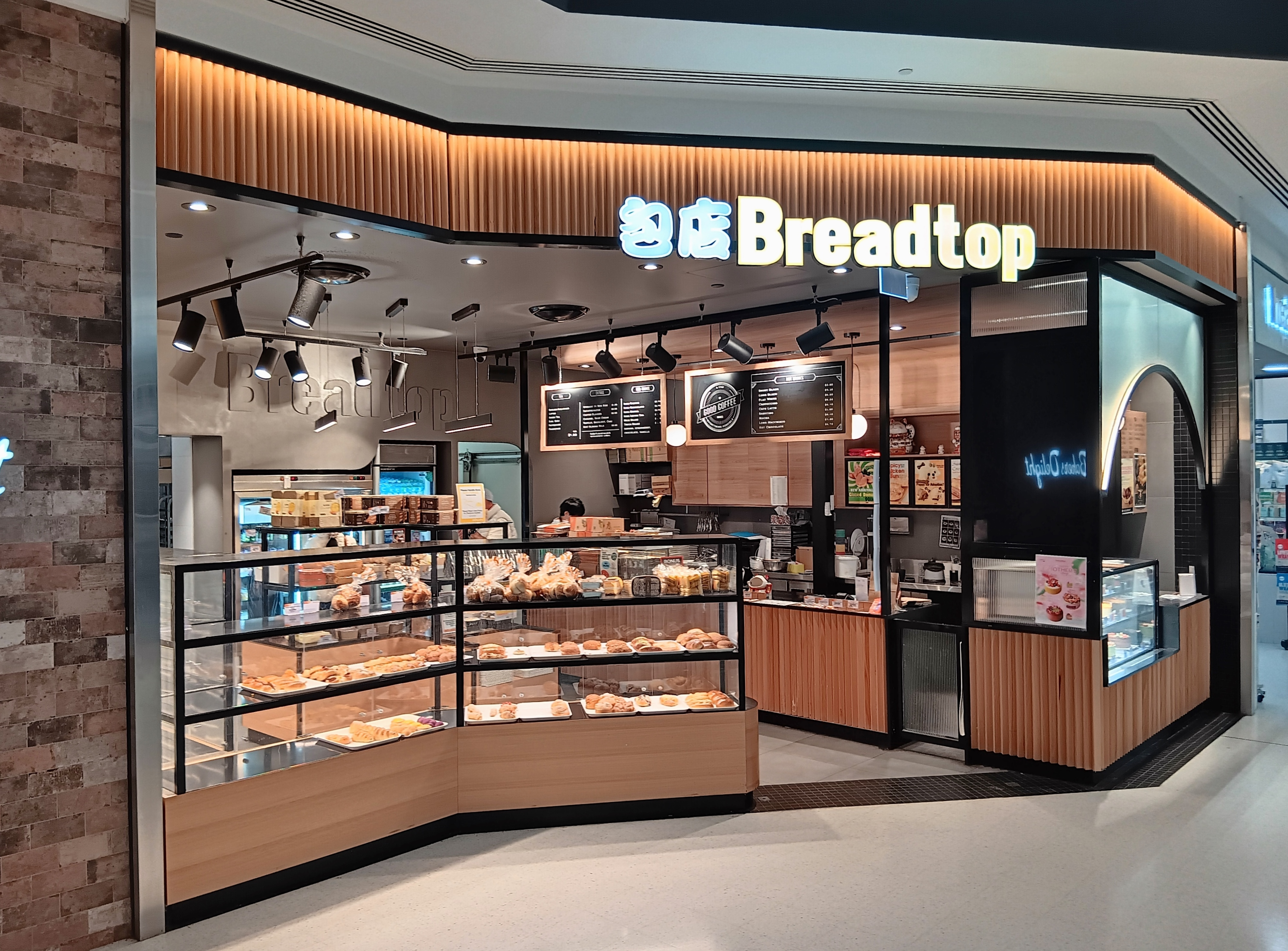
- Breadtop Garden City WA
- Industry: Food and Beverage
- Founded: 2002; 24 years ago
- Headquarters: Richmond, Victoria, Australia
- Key people: Simon Ip, managing director
- Products: Bread and Cakes
- Website: breadtop.com.au

Breadtop (Chinese: 包店, pinyin: bāo diàn) is an Australian bakery franchise selling a wide range of bread, cakes, buns and pastries. The chain is often likened to the Singapore-based Breadtalk due to the similar store concepts, products on offer and designs. As of December 2017, the franchise has over 70 stores throughout metropolitan Melbourne, Sydney, Brisbane, Adelaide, Canberra, Perth and Darwin.

== History ==
Simon Ip and his brother Kenneth run the Breadtop business across Australia. They opened the first Breadtop bakery in Box Hill, Victoria in 2002 and have since opened 70 stores – most of them franchises – across the country.

In 2014 Breadtop launched a self-audit process to review its 800 employees' pay following a series of complaints of underpayment by foreign students that led to backpayments of $2000 to two of the complainants.

In February 2021, Breadtop signed a deal with Australian supermarket chain Coles to supply a range of its products to supermarkets in New South Wales and Victoria.

== See also ==
- List of bakeries
- List of brand name breads
- List of restaurant chains in Australia
