= Taco Bill =

Australian restaurant chain

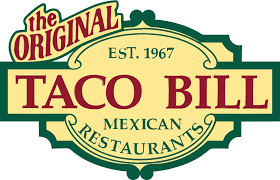

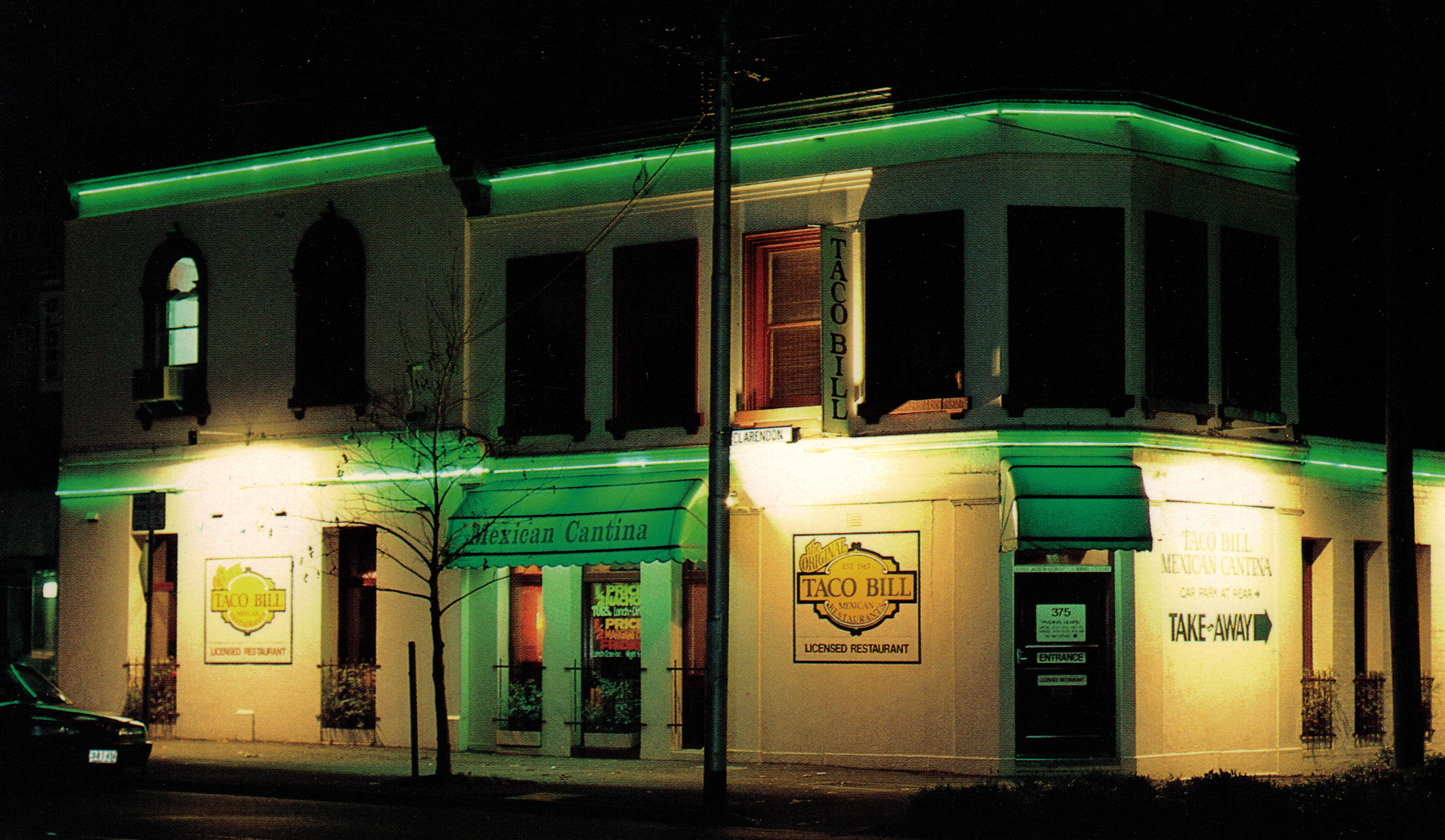
- South Melbourne location
- Industry: Restaurants
- Genre: Mexican food
- Founded: 1967; 59 years ago
- Founder: Bill Chilcote
- Headquarters: Melbourne
- Number of locations: 28 (2021)
- Key people: Tom Kartel (CEO); Stan Teschke; Vicki Teschke
- Members: 70,000 (2021)
- Website: tacobill.com.au

Taco Bill is an Australian restaurant chain serving Tex-Mex style Mexican cuisine. It is the longest-established Mexican franchise in Australia.

== History ==
The restaurant was established in 1967 by Bill Chilcote (16 October 1925 - 11 December 2011). After marrying a Mexican woman whose family owned several cantinas, Chilcote moved to Australia from the Mexico-California border region and introduced Mexican food to the country. The first Taco Bill outlet opened on the Gold Coast as a takeaway location. Subsequent locations opened in Bondi, Sydney and later in Armadale, Melbourne. The chain has 27 stores in Victoria, and its "Club Taco" loyalty program has over 70,000 active members.

A legal dispute with Taco Bell over the American fast-food chain's planned Australian expansion was resolved in February 2020.

== Management ==
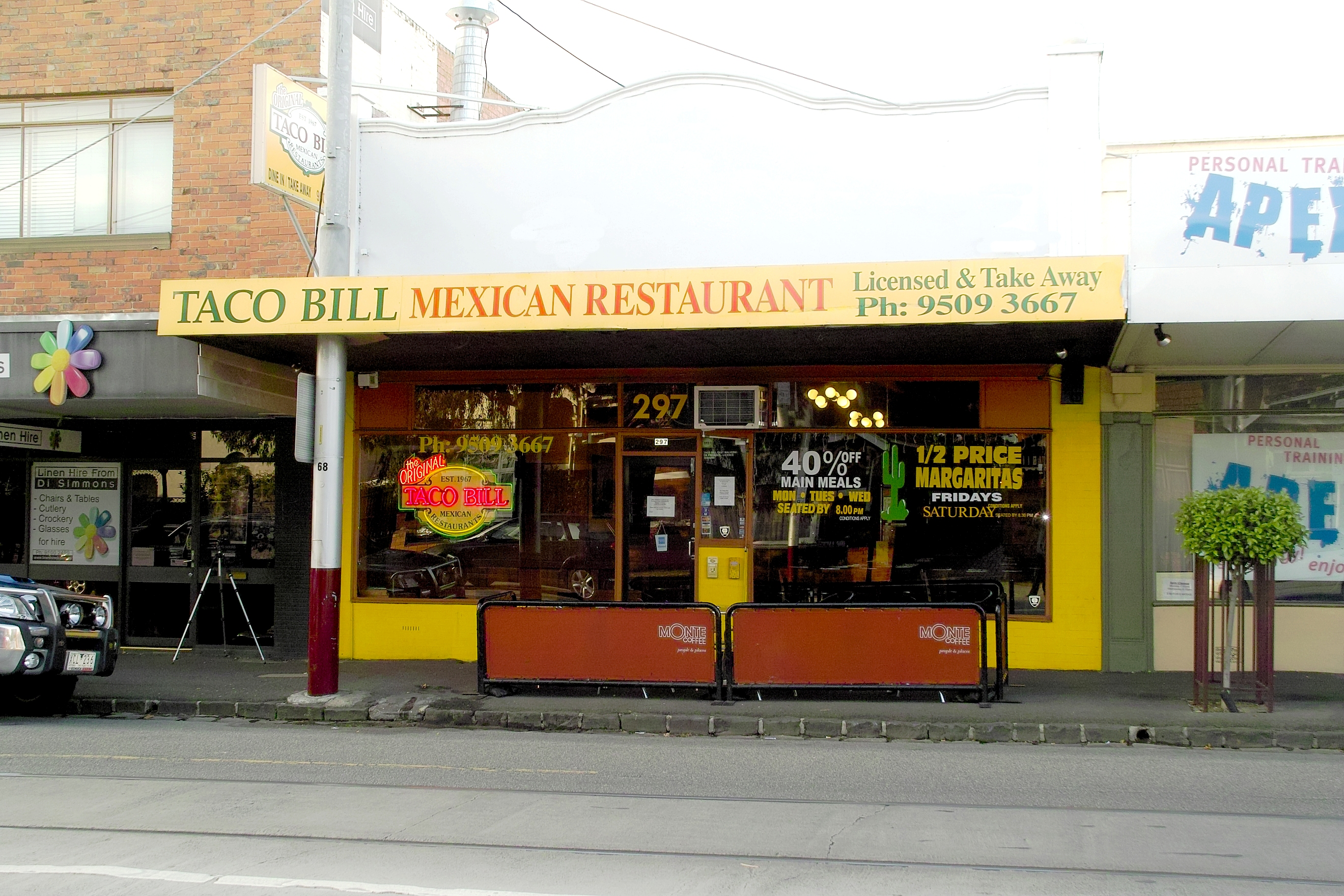
Taco Bill Restaurant in Malvern East

Taco Bill is managed by Tom Kartel, an Iranian native, who arrived in Australia in 1987. He started work as a kitchen hand at Taco Bill's South Melbourne location. In 1994, Kartel opened his own franchise in Springvale, and over the following four years, he acquired two additional outlets in Clifton Hill and Camberwell. In 2002, he bought a 50 percent share of Taco Bill from its owner Stan Teschke. Kartel received a Master of Business Administration (MBA) from Swinburne University.

== Food and drink ==
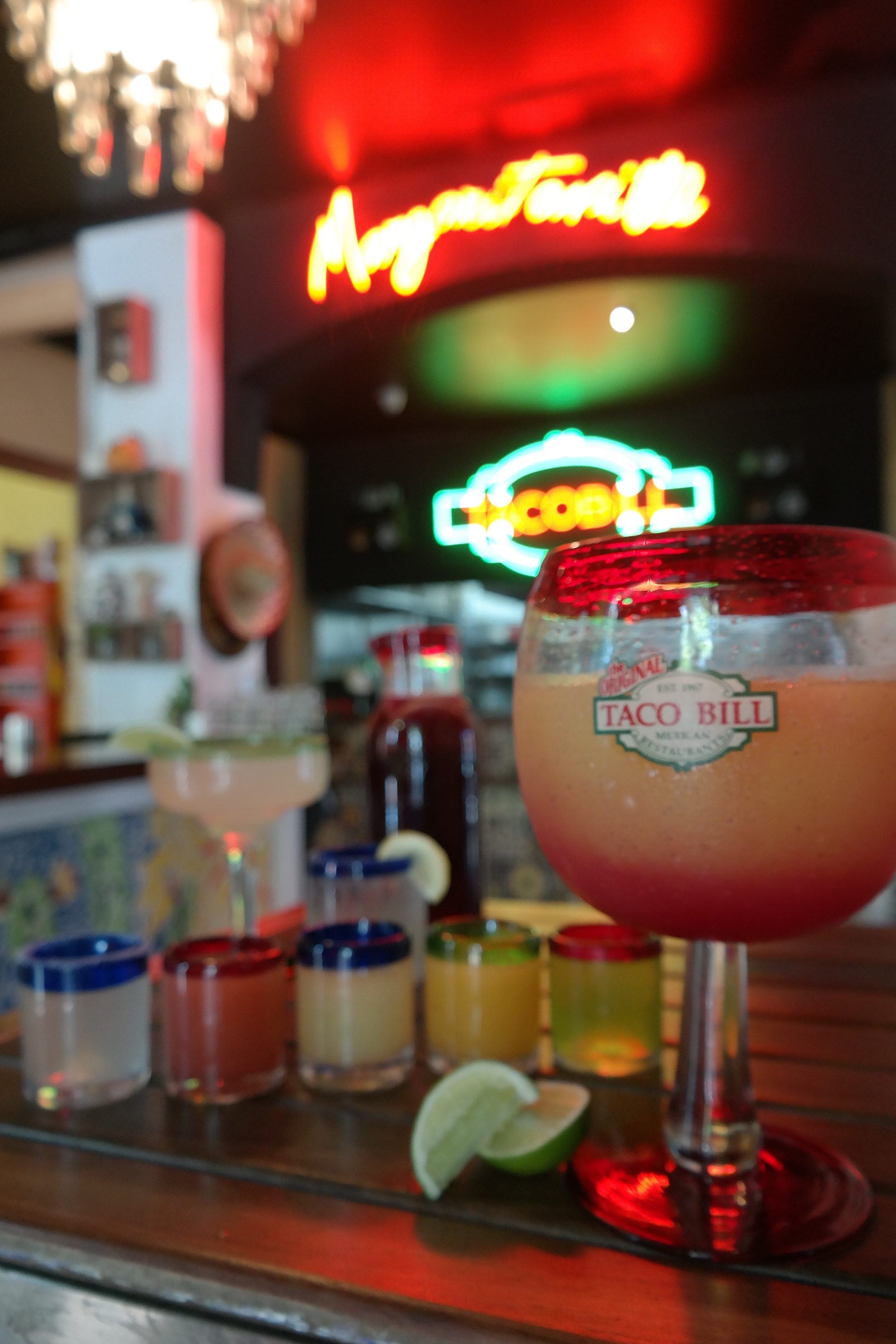
Margarita at Taco Bill

Taco Bill serves Tex-Mex style food, including tacos, nachos, tortillas, quesadillas, enchiladas, fajitas, and burritos. The chain was the first to introduce nachos, tacos, enchiladas, and frozen margaritas to the Australian market. Ingredients are sourced local suppliers, including Aztec Mexican Products and Liquor, Bidfood, G&T Chickens, Merchant Australia, Marino Bros, and Ixom, while various spices are imported directly from Mexico. Taco Bill offers Gluten free, vegetarian, and vegan food and provides dietary or allergen options. It bottles its own trademarked hot sauce, and has previously sold its own tequila and beer. Its beverage selection includes the "Pancho Villa" margarita, which is served with a free sombrero.

== Awards ==
- Savour Australia Restaurant and Catering Awards for Excellence (2016, 2020)
- Lifestyle FOOD Awards (2007, 2009, 2010)

== Charity ==
The Citizen of the Month is held by Taco Bill every month. It also sponsors several local institutions including schools, colleges and clubs. Among them are:

- Ashwood School
- Aurora School
- Belgrave Heights Christian School
- Box Hill Institute
- Carrington Primary School
- Loyola College, Watsonia
- Middle Park Primary School
- Presentation College, Windsor
- Trinity Catholic Primary School
- Upper Ferntree Gully Primary School
- Whitehorse Mustangs Basketball Club
- Juvenile Diabetes Research Foundation
- Operation Smile Australia

== See also ==
- List of restaurants in Australia
- List of Mexican restaurants
