= Spudbar =

Australian baked potato restaurant chain

- Company type: franchise system
- Industry: Restaurant
- Founded: 2 March 2000
- Founder: Clayton Thompson
- Headquarters: Malvern East, Victoria
- Number of locations: 21
- Products: Baked potatoes
- Website: www.spudbar.com.au

SpudBAR is an Australian baked potato chain, founded in 2000 by Clayton Thompson in St.Kilda, Victoria. SpudBAR is the largest Australian owned potato franchise with locations in Victoria, Western Australia and Queensland.

SpudBAR currently has 21 active locations across Australia. Its ventures in Western Australia (at Cannington, Fremantle and Joondalup) were unsuccessful, with each of these stores going out of business.

== Menu ==
SpudBAR offers a variety of pre-set menu options as well as a create your own option.

SpudBAR's menus is made up of three major sections:

- Spuds
- Salads
- Snacks

SpudBAR offers a variety of different spud, salad and snack options depending on customers dietary options. These include;

- Vegetarian (v)
- Dairy free (df)
- Vegan (vg)

== See also ==
- List of restaurant chains in Australia
- List of hamburger restaurants
