= Zeus Street Greek =

Australian fast food chain

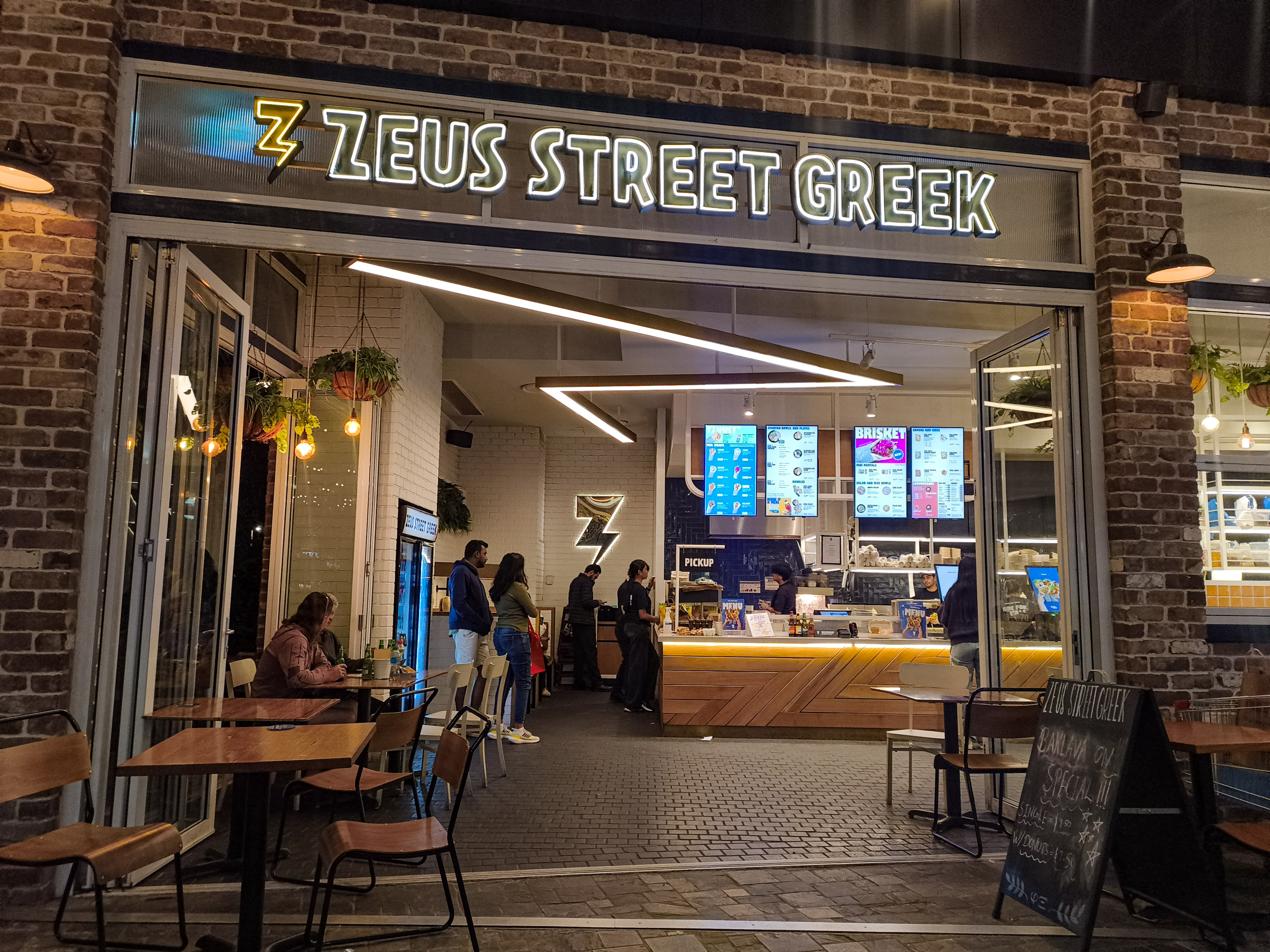
- Zeus Street Greek restaurant at Westfield Carousel
- Product type: Greek cuisine
- Country: Australia
- Introduced: June 2014
- Markets: Australia
- Website: Official website

Zeus Street Greek is a Greek fast food chain in Australia. The first store was opened in June 2014 in Drummoyne, Sydney, New South Wales. It was started by Costa Anastasiadis (the founder of Crust Pizza). As of August 2025, the chain had 41 locations.

The restaurant serves gyros as its flagship product, as well as other food associated with the Greek-Australian diaspora.

In August 2025, Zeus Street Greek launched a range of products, including pita kits and sauces, in Woolworths supermarkets.

== See also ==
- List of restaurant chains in Australia
