= Boost Juice =

Australian juice and smoothie store

Boost Juice Bars

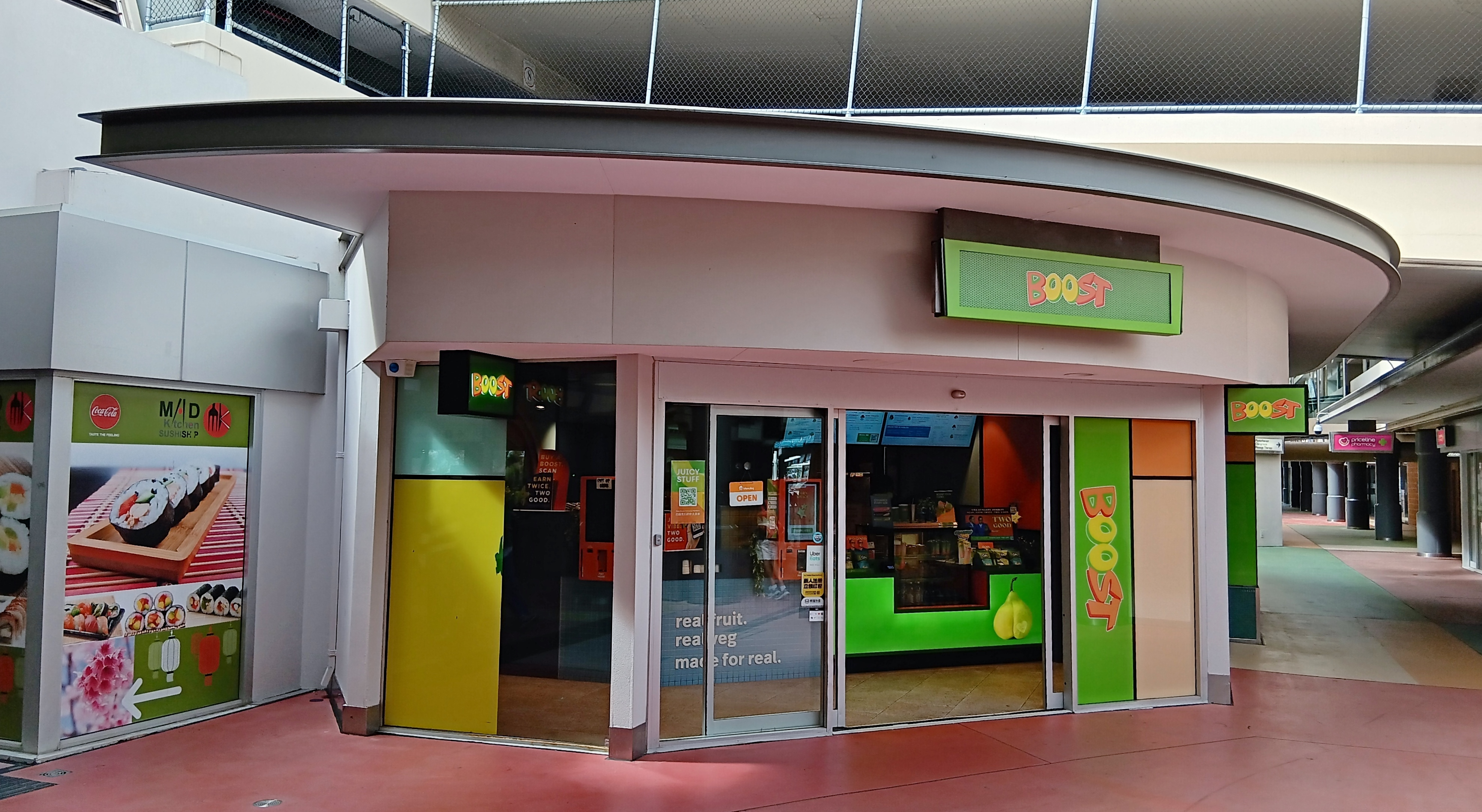
- Perth railway station location
- Type: Subsidiary
- Industry: Food & Beverage
- Founded: March 2000; 26 years ago in Adelaide
- Founder: Janine Allis
- Headquarters: Chadstone, Melbourne, Australia
- Number of locations: 550 (2020)
- Area served: Australia; Brunei; Cambodia; Chile; Estonia; Indonesia; Saudi Arabia; Latvia; Laos; Malaysia; New Zealand; Singapore; South Africa; Taiwan; Thailand; United Kingdom; Vietnam; Malta
- Products: Juices, smoothies
- Parent: Retail Zoo
- Website: www.boostjuicebars.com.au

Boost Juice Bars is an Australian multinational retail outlet owned by parent company Retail Zoo that specialise in fruit juice and smoothies. Boost Juice Bars was formed in 2000 with the first store located in Adelaide, South Australia. The company has expanded internationally with stores in Asia, Europe and South America, through franchising.

== History ==
The founder of Boost Juice Bars, Janine Allis, noticed the fad of the juice bar when on holiday in the United States in 1999. With her husband, Jeff Allis, Janine decided to bring the idea to Australia. In 2000, Allis opened her first Boost Juice Bar in King William Street, Adelaide while she was on maternity leave. At the end of 2004, Boost Juice had 175 stores operating across Australia and New Zealand.

In May 2007, Boost Juice Bars ceased operations in New Zealand after the franchiser (which operated all the New Zealand stores) was put into liquidation. The stores were sold to Tank Juice, which now operates the concept under the Tank brand.

The founders of British bakery firm Millie's Cookies, Richard O'Sullivan and Mario Budwig, signed an agreement with Boost Juice Bars to launch the brand in the United Kingdom. By the end of the year, the company had also expanded into Chile, Kuwait, Singapore, Indonesia and, most recently, Thailand.

In 2008, Nestlé launched a range of fruit smoothies in association with Boost Juice Bars, to operate alongside the company's expansion into the United Kingdom.

Between 2009 and 2012, a Boost Juice store operated in China, but it was plagued by problems—the store opening was delayed, the shop-fit was average and the product was not as good as expected.

In 2010, Riverside Company bought a 65% stake in the Boost Investment Group, paying around $65 million for the share. That year, Boost Juice launched "Boost the way you feel" rebranding to mark its tenth anniversary.

In 2014, Bain Capital bought out Riverside Company to take over as the majority shareholder in Boost Juice.

== Operations ==
Legend: Current locations Former locations

As of June 2022, stores operate in Australia, Brunei Darussalam, Cambodia, Chile, Estonia, Indonesia, Latvia, Laos, Malaysia, New Zealand, Saudi Arabia, Singapore, Taiwan, Thailand, United Kingdom, Vietnam and Malta.

In 2007, Boost Juice Bars attempted to acquire the Canadian juice bar company Booster Juice, which would have led to the company being floated on the stock market, though this was unsuccessful.

As of June 2017, Boost Juice has 270 stores in Australia with another 197 stores worldwide for a total of 467 stores.

== Environmental commitments ==
When Boost first launched in 2000, Janine employed the use of styrofoam cups to minimize costs and to establish Boost as an environmentally friendly brand. The company took the approach that polystyrene cups require less raw materials than paper cups. The company also argues that polystyrene cups can theoretically be fully recycled. However this angle could be interpreted as greenwashing as most city councils in Australia do not recycle soft polystyrene cups.

In late 2013, Boost changed its cups from Styrofoam to paper cups. It did so because:

- The styrofoam cups were visually dated;
- Paper was seen as the more environmentally friendly option, in contradiction of earlier statements by Boost; and
- The bumpy surface of the new paper cups was more aesthetically pleasing to hold and to touch.

Not long after inception, Boost Juice released an Enviro-Cup. This reusable cup could be constantly reused in store. Users of the Enviro-cup received a $3 discount per use.

In 2017, Boost updated its Enviro-Cup with a new Fill-Up-Cup, which maintained the size and discount; however, this cup was considered by the company to be more aesthetically pleasing and was ergonomically designed to be spill-proof.

In late 2018, Boost introduced their reusable stainless steel cup and their stainless steel straw and straw cleaner kit.

== See also ==
- Juice bar
- List of restaurant chains in Australia
