= Shingle Inn =

Bakery chain headquartered in Brisbane, Australia

Shingle Inn logo

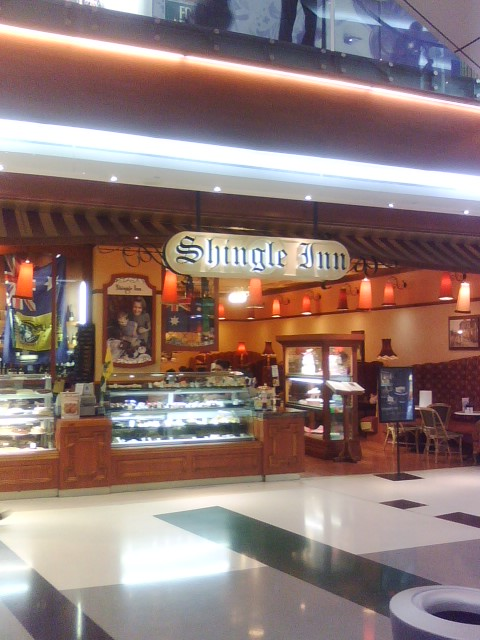
A franchised Shingle Inn at MacArthur Central, Brisbane

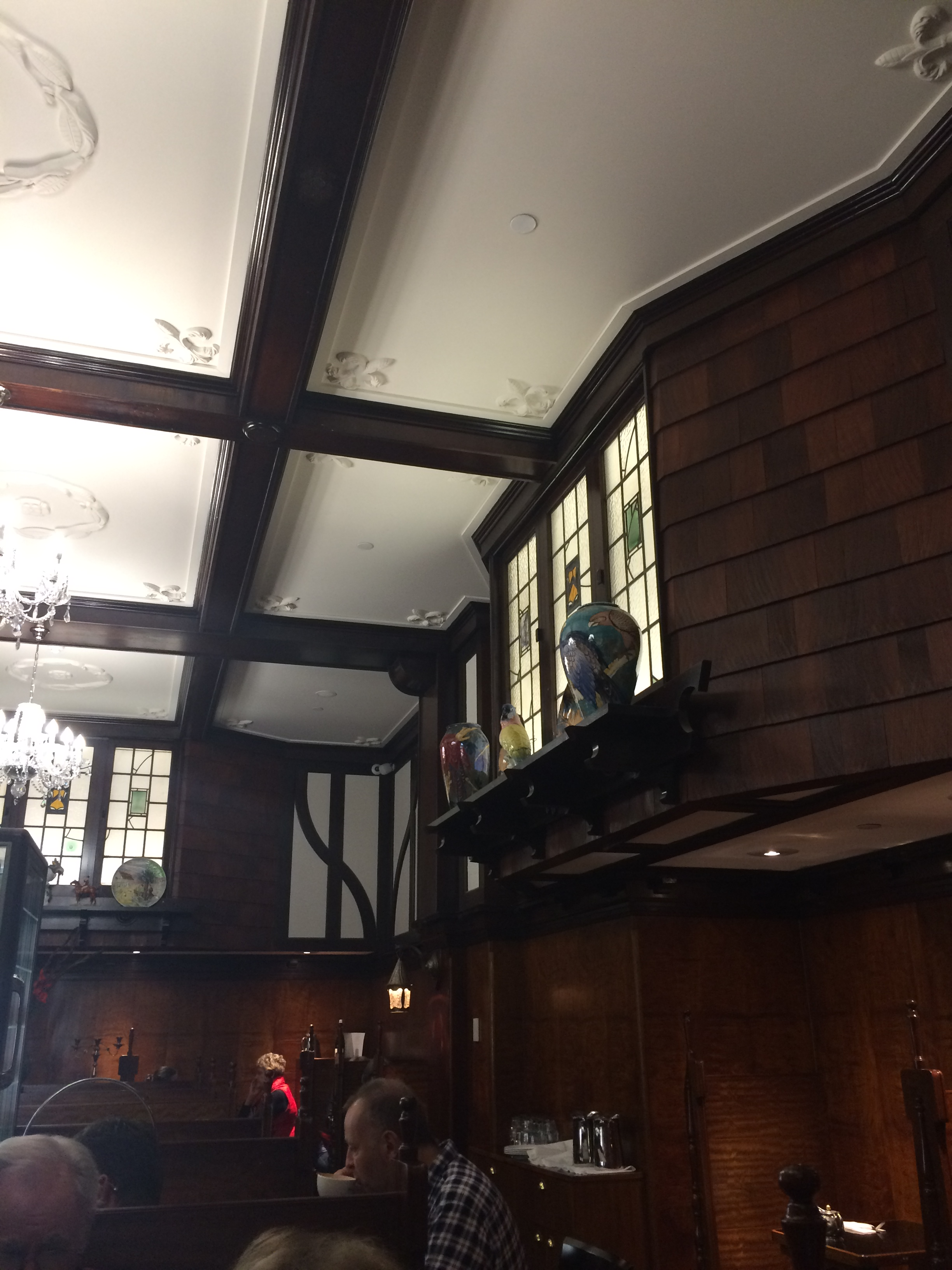
Original Tudor style fittings restored at the Shingle Inn, Brisbane City Hall, 2015

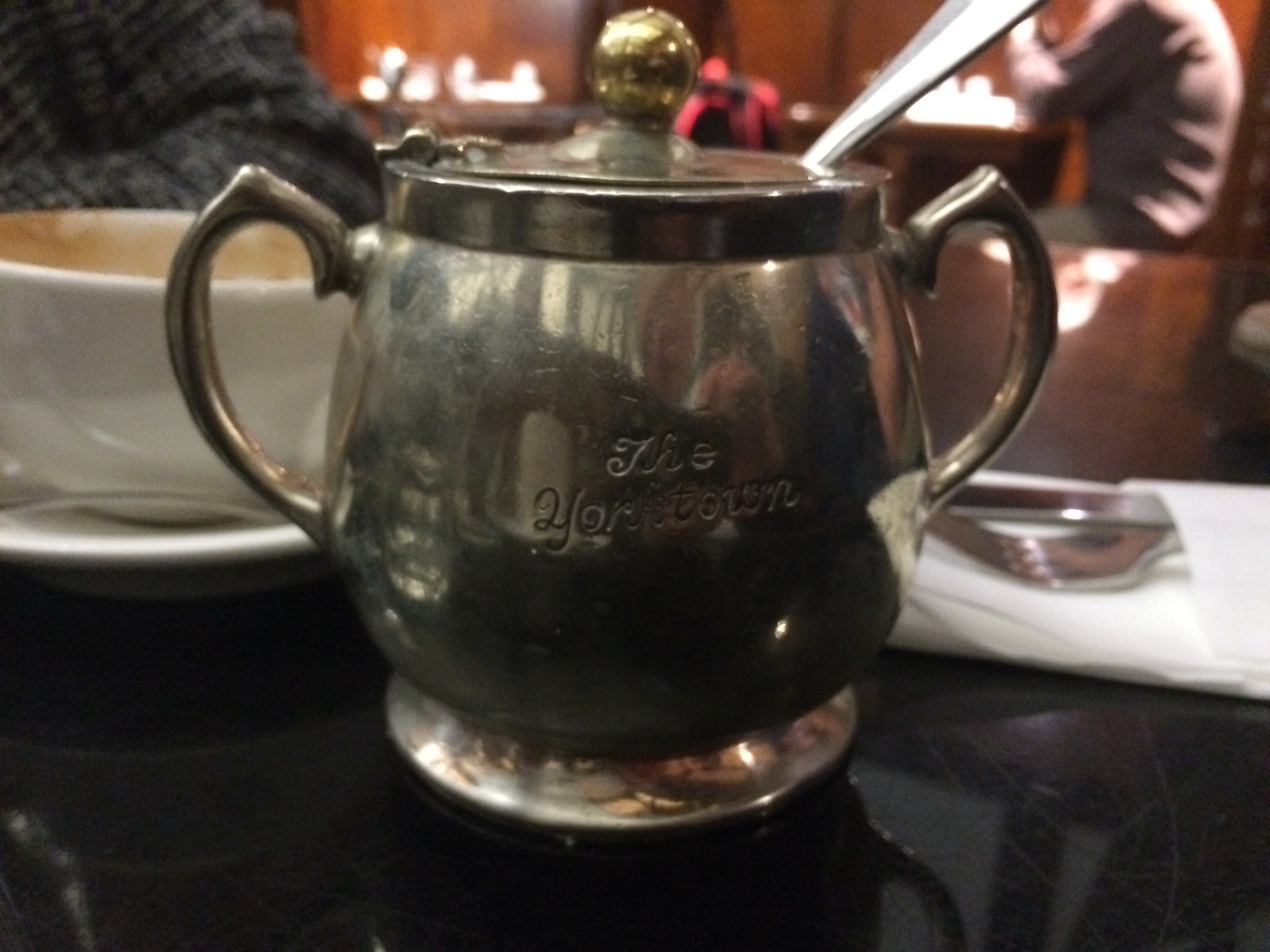
Yorktown sugar bowl, Shingle Inn, Brisbane City Hall, 2015

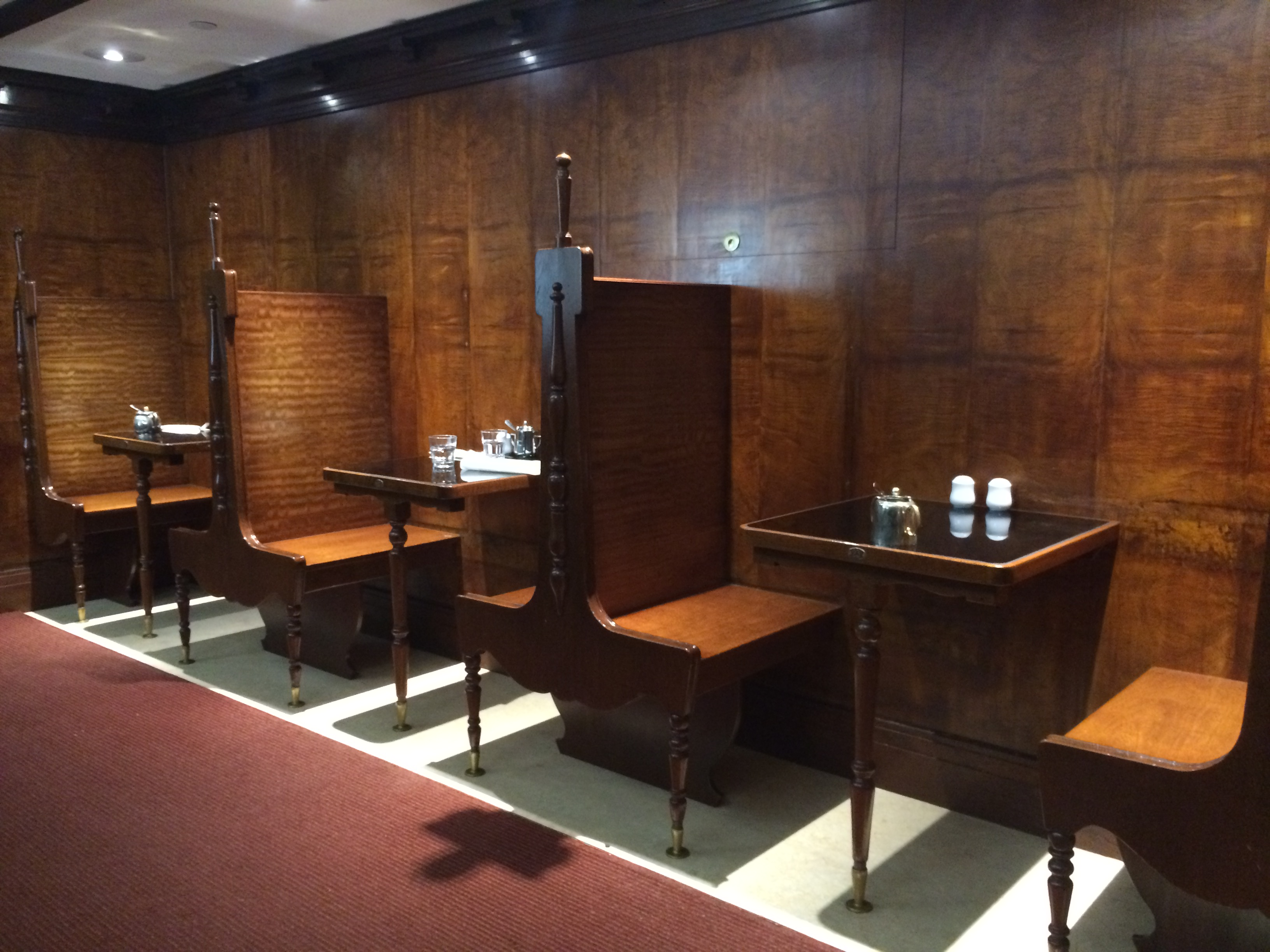
Restored booths, Shingle Inn, Brisbane City Hall, 2015

The Shingle Inn is a restaurant and bakery franchise headquartered in Brisbane, Queensland, Australia.

== History ==
The Shingle Inn opened in 1936 at 254 Edward Street, Brisbane in 1936 as a Tudor inn style restaurant.

The Shingle Inn is a considerably well known aspect of Brisbane's dining culture, where it has welcomed generations of diners, and was also popular with American service personnel during World War II. It is one of the oldest continuing restaurants in the city of Brisbane. It has been owned since 1975 by the Bellchambers Family.

With the closure of the flagship store in 2002 due to the new Queens Plaza development, the fittings of the store were removed and placed into storage. A franchise of the restaurant was created with a dozen stores throughout the Brisbane central business district, suburbs, the Gold Coast and Sunshine Coast.

With the re-opening of Brisbane City Hall after its $215 million refurbishment in April 2013, the fittings and layout of the original Shingle Inn in Edward Street were replaced inside Brisbane City Hall, re-creating the olde-world Tudor atmosphere of the original 1936 restaurant. The sugar bowls used in the restored city hall branch bear the engraved names of the Shingle Inn and other former Brisbane cafes (Renoir, Websters, Yorktown) that were owned by the Webster and Bellchambers families.

The Shingle Inn has a franchise network of 30 cafes in Queensland, New South Wales, Victoria, Western Australia, and in December 2019, Shingle Inn opened its first store in South Australia as well as their first international store in New Zealand.

== See also ==
- List of restaurant chains in Australia
