= Noodle Box =

Australian company

- Type: Subsidiary
- Founded: 1996; 30 years ago (Chapel Street, South Yarra, Victoria)
- Founder: David Milne; Josh James
- Headquarters: Abbotsford, Victoria, Australia
- Area served: Australia; New Zealand; Singapore; Malaysia
- Products: Southeast Asian–influenced street food
- Parent: Concept Eight
- Website: www.noodlebox.com.au

Noodle Box Pty Ltd is an Australian-based multinational stir-fried noodle quick service restaurant chain headquartered in Melbourne founded by Josh James and David Milne in 1996.

Noodle Box is Australia's largest franchised noodle restaurant chain, with a network of over 70 restaurants across the country.

All Noodle Box restaurants are franchised, with master franchise partners in the Middle East and Mauritius. This move towards franchising the brand was delivered under the strategic direction of current CEO, Ian Martin, previously the CFO of Yum! Restaurants in Asia, and Group CEO of Gloria Jeans Coffee.

== Growth strategy ==
In October 2015, Noodle Box announced a strategic takeover of the noodle QSR network Wok in a Box. This consolidation of the brands makes Noodle Box the largest noodle-based QSR in Australia, with more than 100 restaurants across the country.

== See also ==
- List of restaurant chains in Australia

In Adelaide, the Noodlebox stores at Glenelg and Marryatville operate late -night trading hours with full menu. Both stores are open until 4 am daily.
