= Retail Zoo =

Australian company

- Type: Private
- Industry: Fast food
- Founded: 2000; 26 years ago
- Founder: Janine and Jeff Allis
- Revenue: $178 million (2022)
- Net income: $15 million (2022)
- Parent: Adamantem Capital

Retail Zoo is an Australian company that owns multiple major restaurant chains, including Boost Juice, Betty’s Burgers and Salsa's Fresh Mex Grill. It also previously owned the Hatch Chicken Shop and Cibo Espresso chains.

Valued at around half a billion dollars, it is a private company that has explored a public listing on at least two occasions, first exploring and then putting on pause the idea in 2019; before resuming its pursuit of an IPO again in 2022.

In 2023, Australian private equity firm Adamantem Capital acquired a majority stake in the company for $350 million.

== History ==
Retail Zoo was founded by Janine and Jeff Allis in 2000. The company acquired the Cibo Espresso coffee chain in December 2012 and launched the Hatch Chicken Shop chain in 2013.

A majority stake in Retail Zoo was later sold to private equity investor Riverside Company. In 2014 Riverside's shareholding was purchased by Bain Capital. During this time, it explored a public listing on the ASX in 2019, but the listing ultimately didn't go ahead that year; and remained owned by Bain. In 2022 the company lodged documents with the Australian Securities & Investments Commission to change its status to a public company. However, it was later acquired by Australian private equity firm Adamantem Capital following a $225m capital raise through debt syndication by the Commonwealth Bank.

Its reported valuation history is as follows:

Date	Valuation	Source
2014	majority stake = $185m	SmartCompany
October 2019	$482m	Goldman Sachs estimate (sponsor-broker)
April 2022	$400m	AFR estimate
February 2023	majority stake = $350m	SmartCompany

In November 2024, Retail Zoo sold the Cibo Espresso chain to Retail Food Group for A$2.7 million.
