= 2021 Mansfield earthquake =

Strong earthquake in Victoria, Australia

- Location within Victoria Location within Australia
- UTC time: 2021-09-21 23:15:53
- ISC event: 621094758
- USGS-ANSS: ComCat
- Local date: 22 September 2021
- Local time: 09:15:53
- Duration: 10–60 seconds
- Magnitude: M_{w} 5.9
- Depth: 10.0 km (6.2 mi) (Geoscience Australia) 12.0 km (7.5 mi) (USGS)
- Epicentre: 37.491°S 146.363°E
- Fault: Governor Fault
- Type: Strike-slip
- Max. intensity: MMI VII (Very strong)
- Peak acceleration: 0.2g
- Aftershocks: M_{w} 4.1
- Casualties: 1 injured

An earthquake struck approximately 53 kilometres SSE of the town of Mansfield (in the vicinity of the township of Woods Point), in the Victorian Alps of Australia on 22 September 2021, at 09:15 local time. The earthquake measured 5.9 on the moment magnitude scale. The earthquake caused minor structural damage in parts of Melbourne and left one person injured. The earthquake was also felt in New South Wales, Australian Capital Territory, South Australia and Tasmania. The earthquake was substantially stronger than the 1989 Newcastle earthquake that measured 5.6 and killed 13 people.

== Tectonic setting ==
The Australian landmass is situated in the Australian plate, far from any known active plate boundary, where most of the world's earthquakes occur. Such earthquakes at the plate boundary are known as interplate earthquakes. In Australia, earthquakes occurring within the Australian plate are known as intraplate earthquakes because they happen within a tectonic plate rather than at the boundary.

The earthquake is situated in the Lachlan Fold Belt, an orogenic belt consisting of folded and faulted strata. This zone formed as a result of plate convergence occurring at the eastern boundary of the supercontinent Gondwana during the Neoproterozoic. From the Neoproterozoic to Early Devonian, the region was dominated by thrusting and some rifting. Crustal deformation were later accommodated by predominantly strike-slip faulting in the Devonian. One of the major strike-slip faults accommodating this deformation is the Baragwanath Transform; a transform fault. Rifting also occurred in this period, leading to volcanism. By the Middle Devonian, the Baragwanath Transform became extinct. The Governor Fault marks the northern margin of the Melbourne Zone, and southern margin of the Tabberabberan Orogeny, and is characterised by strike-slip movement.

The Governor Fault is a large intraplate fault that runs from mid-western New South Wales, along part of the Murray River bed and cutting through Central North Victoria near Barmah to the Victorian Alps near Mount Buller (near the quake epicentre) down toward the Gippsland Basin near the coast at Saint Margaret Island. Tectonically this fault separates the Melbourne and Tabberabberan structural zones.

An earthquake of magnitude 6.0 or larger strikes Australia about once every six to ten years, based on the seismological data collected over the past 150 years. The last-known magnitude 6.0 quake in Australia occurred in 2016 in the Northern Territory. That earthquake occurred as a result of shallow reverse faulting within the Australian plate. The largest earthquake in Australia was the mainshock of the 1988 Tennant Creek earthquakes which consisted of an M_{w}6.7 quake preceded by two M_{w}> 6.0 foreshocks.

== Earthquake ==
According to the United States Geological Survey, the earthquake occurred on 22 September at 09:15 ACST and measured 5.9 on the moment magnitude scale. The agency also reported that the shock occurred at a depth of 12 km (7.5 mi). It had an epicentre in Woods Point, or about 130 km (81 mi) northeast of Melbourne. The earthquake's location places it within the Southern Seismic Zone, a region of considerable tectonic strain. While there northwest–southeast trending faults dated to the Neogene to Quaternary, the earthquake did not occur on any of them. Furthermore InSAR scans failed to locate any possible surface ruptures, indicating a deeper source for the earthquake. In 2023, seismologists published their findings in Seismological Research Letters, concluding that the earthquake was caused by a rupture along an unmapped buried strike-slip fault that is oriented to the north and located at a deeper depth than the mapped faults.

== Impact ==
According to a geologist at the University of Melbourne, the quake produced ten seconds of strong shaking which was felt by people. The earthquake generated shaking lasting up to a minute at the epicentre region.

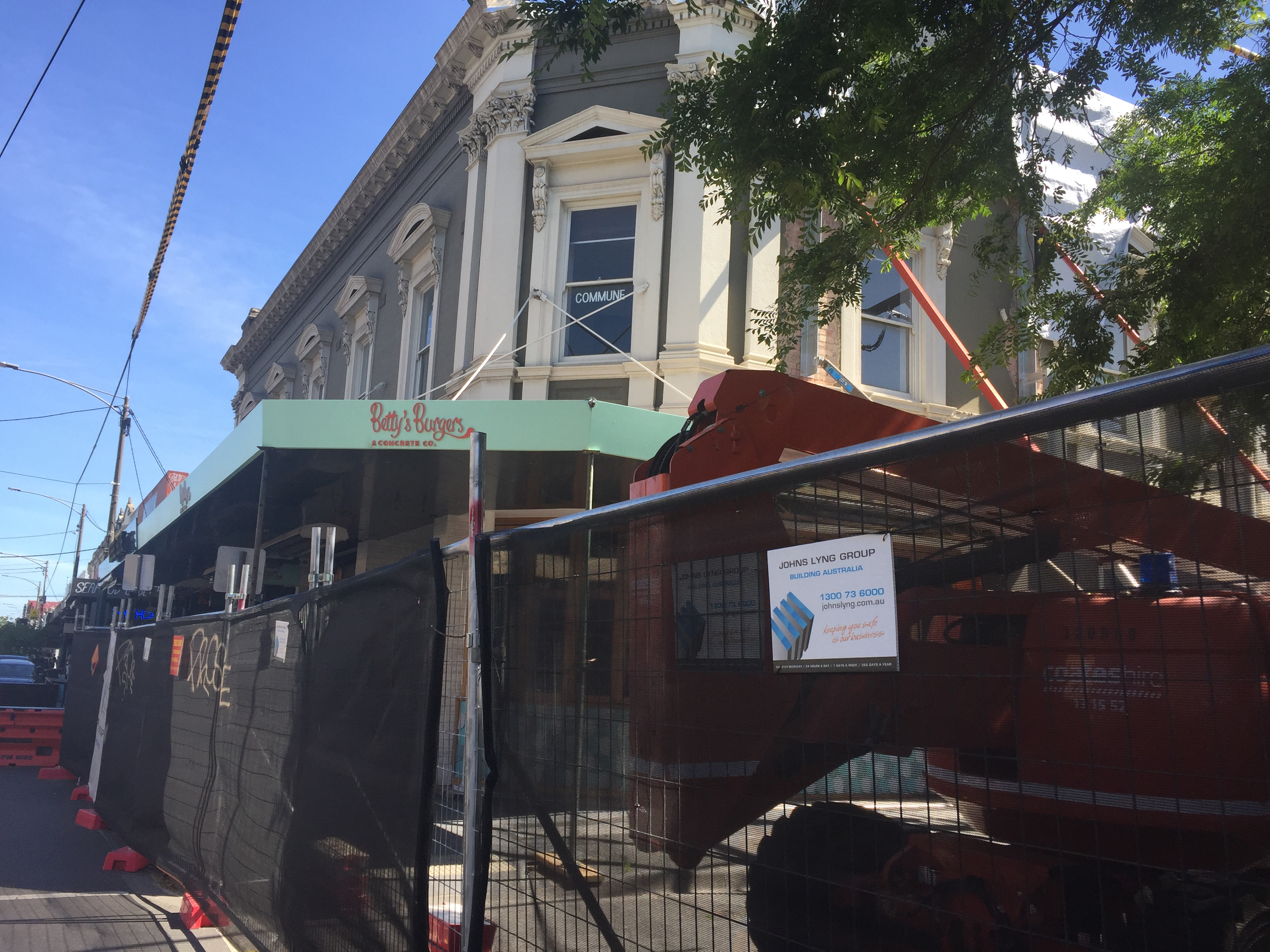
A Betty's Burgers store on Chapel Street, Melbourne (pictured in November 2021) damaged as a result of the earthquake

Many residential buildings in Melbourne were evacuated due to the damage inflicted by the quake. Some damage was reported in many parts of Victoria. On Chapel Street, the earthquake collapsed the top facade of Betty's Burgers & Concrete Co., which is a brick building and left debris across the road. Along Brunswick Road in Fitzroy another brick building suffered a partial collapse of its facade. At least 46 instances of building damage to chimneys and facades were reported in the city. Tall residential apartments of up to 50 storeys swayed for as much as 20 seconds, triggering panic among residents. In Mansfield near the epicentre, there was minor damage to some buildings including a local ambulance centre. Power outages were reported across parts of metropolitan Melbourne.

In the town of Mansfield, Victoria, the quake caused some minor damage to buildings, resulting in no casualties. At least 40 km away is a gold mine operated by Kaiser Reef. When the tremors began, at least twelve mining workers were present in the mine and were brought to the surface unhurt. Kaiser Reef said that mining would cease temporarily while inspections were carried out. The company did not find any damage in the mine area. Another mine located 60 km away, and operated by White Rock Minerals did not find any damage to their mines after the quake. Nine workers under the mine were safely evacuated.

Initially, state officials and emergency services said no casualties were caused by the earthquake, but a man in Mount Eliza, a coastal suburb in Melbourne, sustained minor injuries. The man was injured when construction fell on him while he was working.

Geoscience Australia said the earthquake is the strongest to hit Victoria in 50 years. It is also the largest earthquake on land in the nation since a magnitude 6.0 struck the Northern Territory in 2016.

== Response ==
Acting Premier of Victoria James Merlino announced a statewide Watch and Act warning was in place for Victoria. The Fire & Rescue New South Wales service stated on social media that they had received calls for assistance in the New South Wales area, but did not report any serious structural damage.

== Media coverage ==
The earthquake made headlines in Australian news outlets the moment it occurred. News Breakfast was interrupted by the shaking which was video recorded. The earthquake which lasted 20 seconds in the filming studio caught hosts Michael Rowland and Tony Armstrong by surprise.

== Further tremors ==
On 4 October 2021, a 2.9-magnitude tremor was felt in the Victorian town of Rawson at approximately 11:11 p.m. The following day, two further tremors were recorded, both with a 3.0 magnitude occurring at 7:17 a.m. and at 9:17 a.m. It is believed to be linked to the earthquake which occurred two weeks prior. Geoscience Australia estimates that the depth of those tremors was 8 to 10 kilometres deep.

== See also ==
- List of earthquakes in 2021
- List of earthquakes in Australia
