= Zarraffa's Coffee =

Australian coffeehouse chain

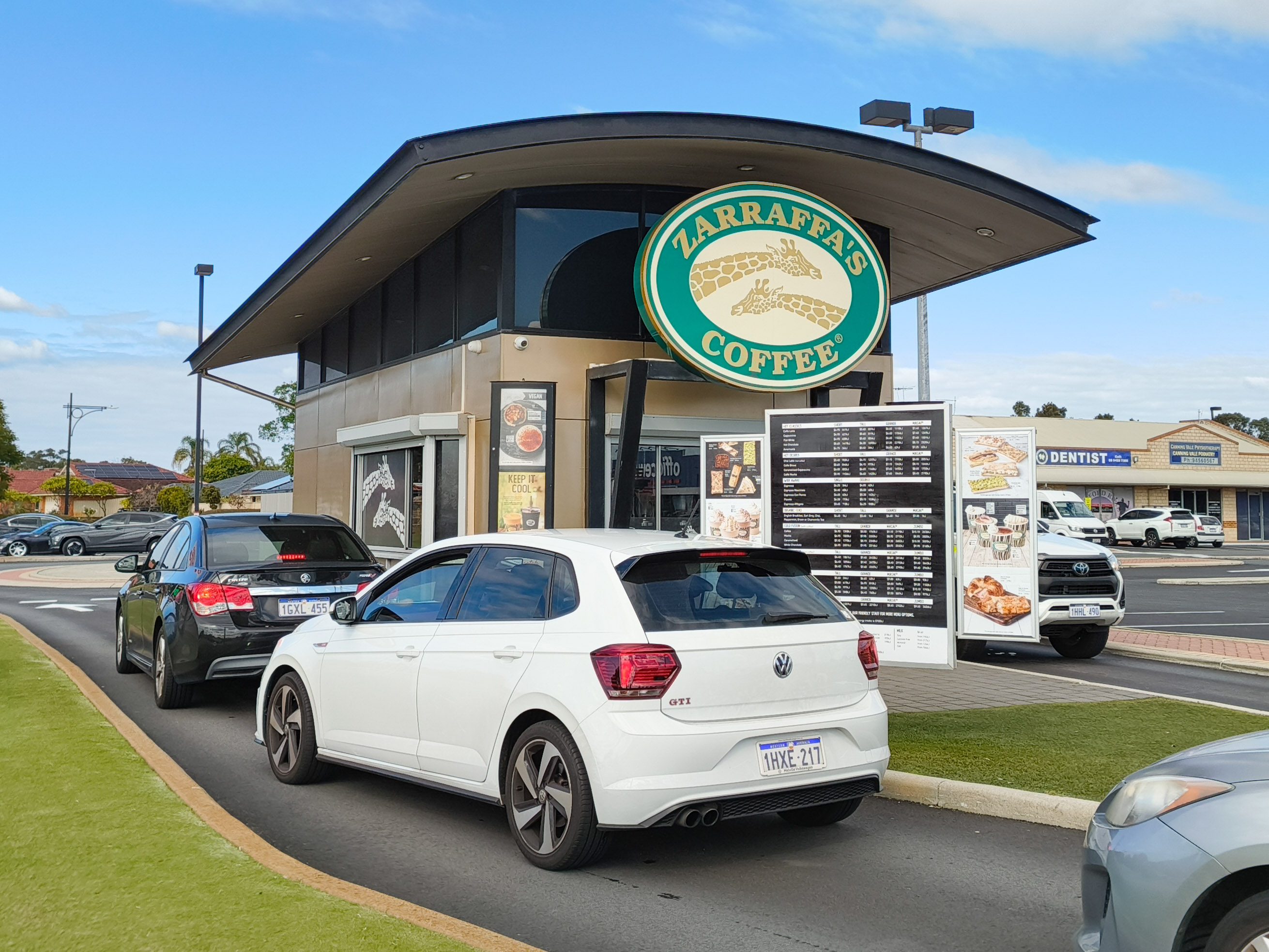
- Zarraffa's Coffee drive-through store in Canning Vale
- Company type: Private
- Industry: Quick service restaurant
- Founded: 1996; 30 years ago in Australia
- Founder: Kenton Campbell
- Headquarters: Eagleby, Queensland, Australia, Australia
- Number of locations: 80 stores (2025)
- Services: Coffee, drinks, coffee roasting
- Number of employees: 1200+ (2019)
- Website: zarraffas.com

Zarraffa's Coffee is an Australian coffee house chain located primarily in Queensland and with franchises in Western Australia, New South Wales and South Australia. As of May 2025, there were 80 locations around Australia.

== History ==
Zarraffa's Coffee, established in 1996 by Kenton Campbell, was originally a roasting house operating from the backstreets of Southport on the Gold Coast. It opened its first store on the Gold Coast with three tables and nine chairs in 1996.

By 2009 the company had 40 stores, including a second drive-through in Toowoomba and a Central Queensland store at Rockhampton. Also in 2009 Kenton Campbell launched a non-profit charitable foundation established to address environmental and conservation issues.

By August 2018, Zarraffa's Coffee has opened its 50th drive-through store, and its 85th store in Australia. A new company headquarters was established at Eagleby, Queensland in late 2018.

In November 2020, Zarraffa's launched Sugar Creek Smokehouse, an Australian-Texan BBQ fusion.

In April 2025, Zarraffa's acquired First Things First Coffee, a South Australian drive-through coffee chain with four locations. In October 2025, the company open its first store in South Australia.

== Awards ==
- In 2007 and 2008, Zarraffa's Coffee received the Gold Coast Business of the Year award.
- Gold Coast Young Entrepreneur of the Year 2008 – Kenton Campbell, Managing Director
- 2011 Australian Business Award for ‘Enterprise’

== See also ==
- List of coffeehouse chains
- List of restaurant chains in Australia
