= 4Fingers Crispy Chicken =

Fast food chain

4FINGERS Crispy Chicken
- Type: Private company
- Industry: Food and Beverage
- Founded: 2009; 17 years ago
- Headquarters: Singapore
- Number of locations: 27
- Area served: Australia; Indonesia; Malaysia; Singapore; Thailand
- Key people: Vijay Sethu (Owner)
- Products: Crispy fried chicken; Seafood; Burgers; Salads; Beverages
- Number of employees: 150
- Website: 4fingers.com

4Fingers (stylised as 4FINGERS; also known as 4FINGERS Crispy Chicken) is a Singaporean multinational chain of casual fast-food restaurants that specialise in Asian-style crispy fried chicken.

Headquartered in Singapore, the chain was founded in 2009 and currently has 27 stores across Singapore, Malaysia, Indonesia, Thailand and Australia. The company expanded to Malaysia in 2015. The brand also has two outlets in Medan, Indonesia, and one in Central Ladprao, Bangkok, Thailand. From June to July 2017, 4Fingers also opened an outlet in Melbourne, Australia and two outlets in Queensland, Australia, with plans for expansion to Europe and the US in the future.

== History ==
4Fingers was established in 2009.

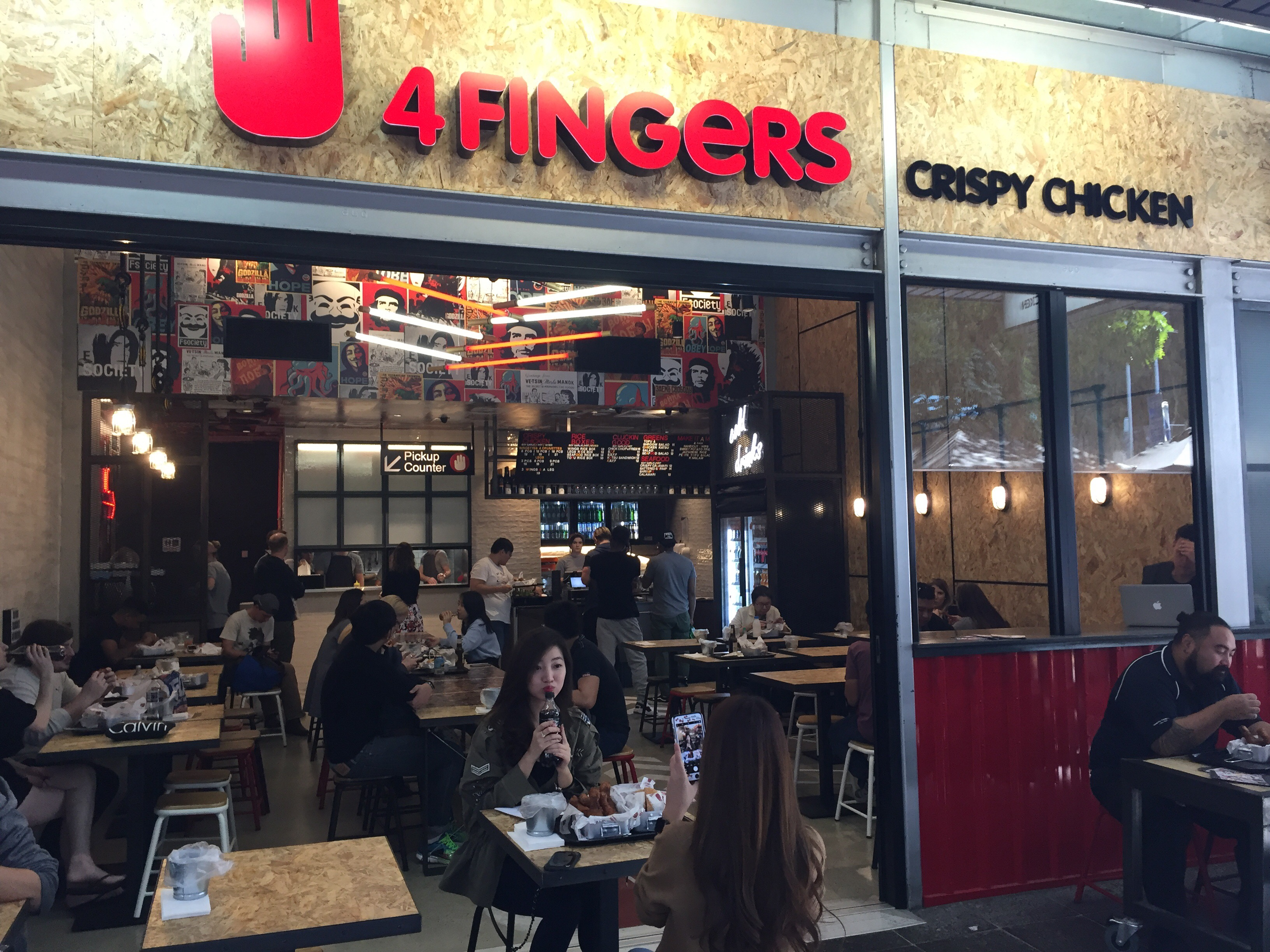
A 4Fingers outlet in Brisbane, Australia

In 2015, they opened their first overseas store in Kuala Lumpur, Malaysia. In June 2017, 4FINGERS announced its expansion to Australia, with their first store located on Bourke Street, Melbourne.

In September 2019, 4Fingers announced its acquisition of 50% stake in Australia-based Mad Mex Fresh Mexican Grill (Mad Mex).

As part of the partnership, 4Fingers will initially establish Mad Mex's presence in Southeast Asia and expects to open a number of outlets in Singapore and Malaysia by the end of 2019.

== Products ==
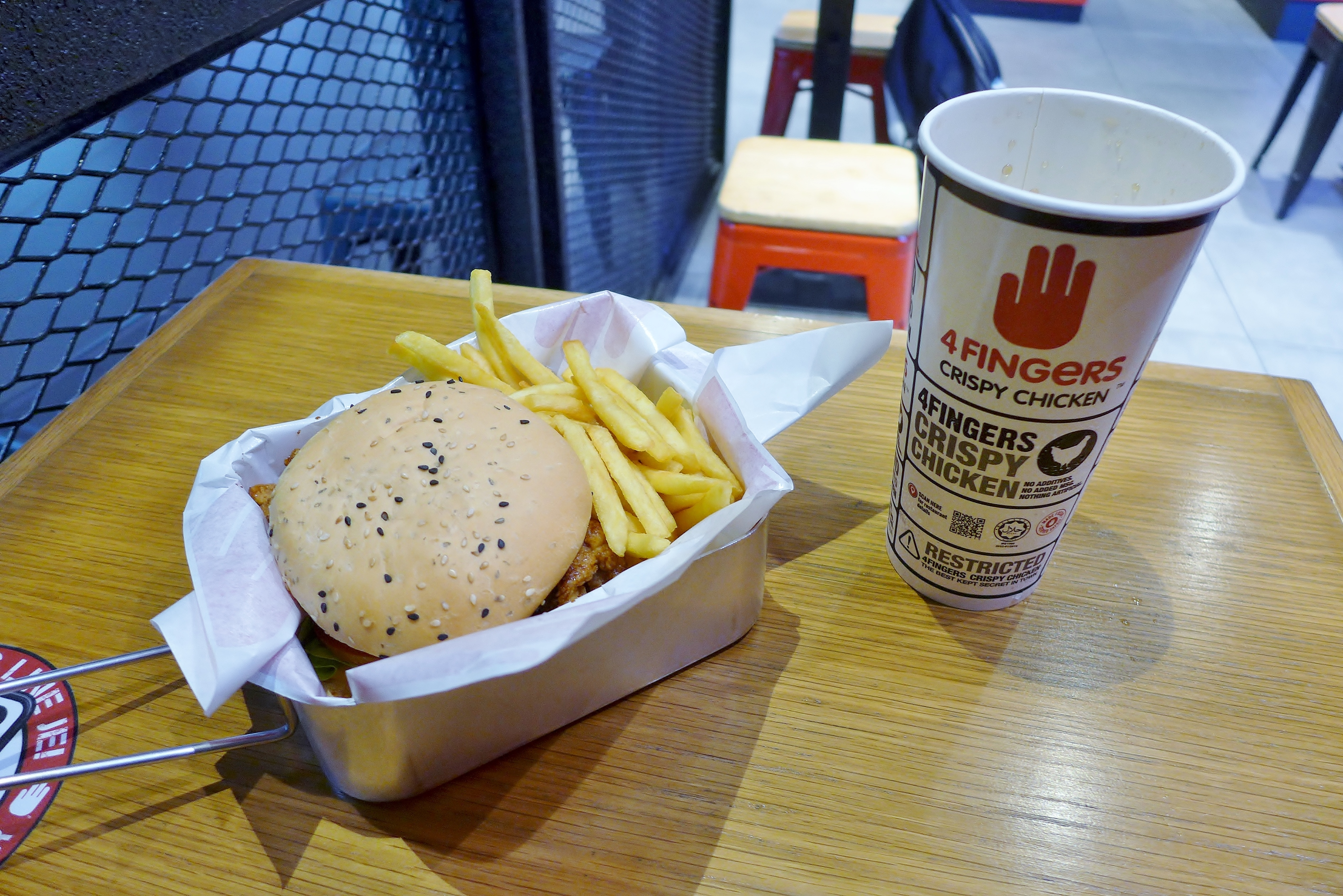
A 4Fingers Chicc Crisp meal served in Kuala Lumpur, Malaysia

4Fingers offers free-range fried chicken, baked burger buns and kimslaw (kimchi coleslaw). The menu also includes Asian rice boxes, salads and crispy seafood dishes. Their core products are based on their signature sauces, which are made from a base of fermented soy sauces.
