= Muffin Break =

International cafe franchise

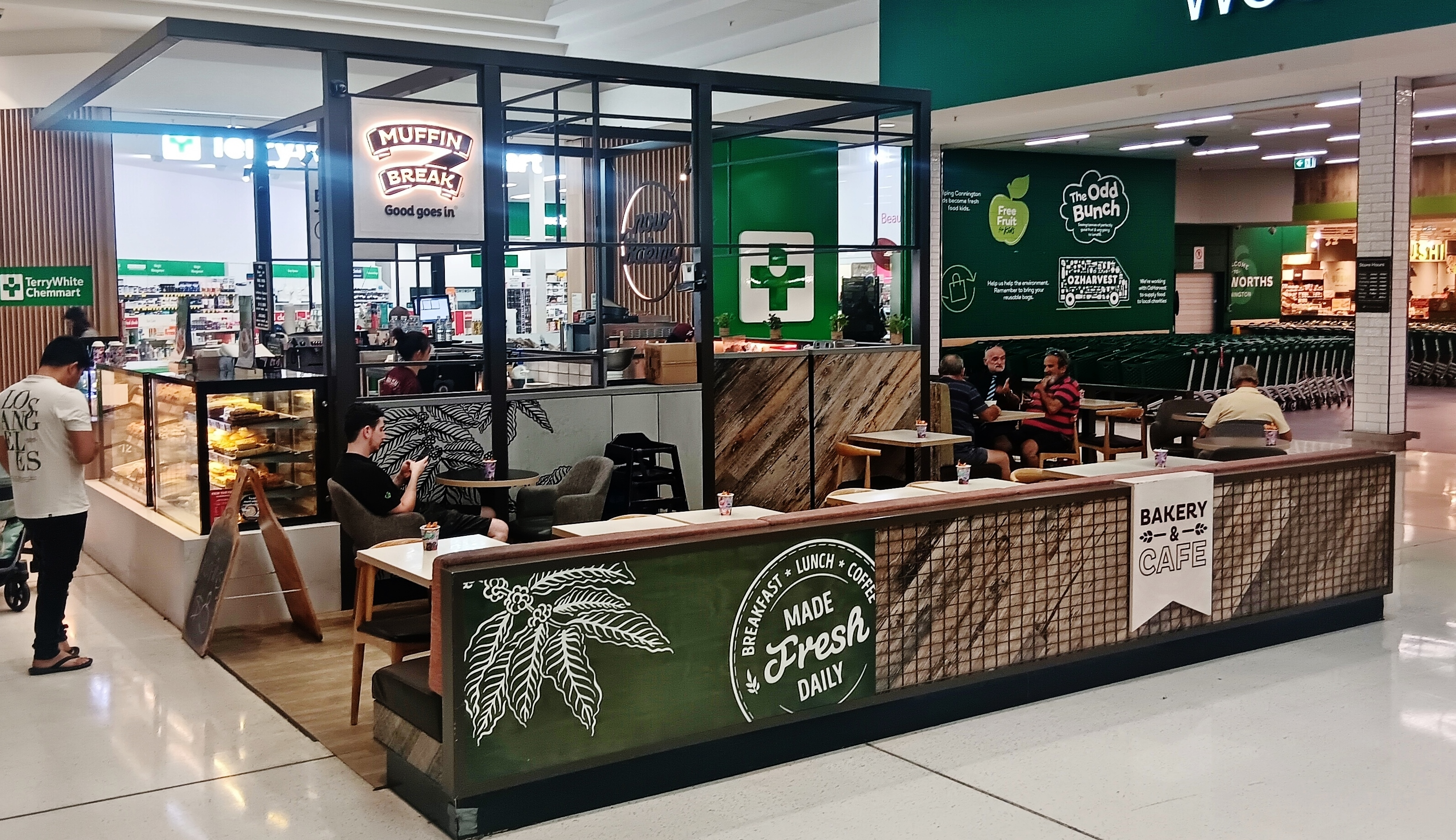
- Kiosk at Westfield Carousel
- Type: Division
- Industry: Hospitality
- Founded: 1989; 37 years ago in Coolangatta, Queensland, Australia
- Area served: Australia, New Zealand, United Kingdom
- Owner: Foodco Group Pty Ltd
- Website: muffinbreak.com.au

Muffin Break is a franchise business of Foodco which operates small bakery cafe coffee shops throughout Australia, New Zealand, and the UK. As of 2025 Muffin Break had 260 stores worldwide. Muffin Break is the sister company of Jamaica Blue, which is also a franchise of Foodco Group Pty Ltd.

== History ==
The Muffin Break concept originated in Canada in the 1970s but was acquired by Foodco Group Pty Ltd and adapted for contemporary conditions. The first of the new style Muffin Break stores opened in 1989 in Coolangatta, Queensland.

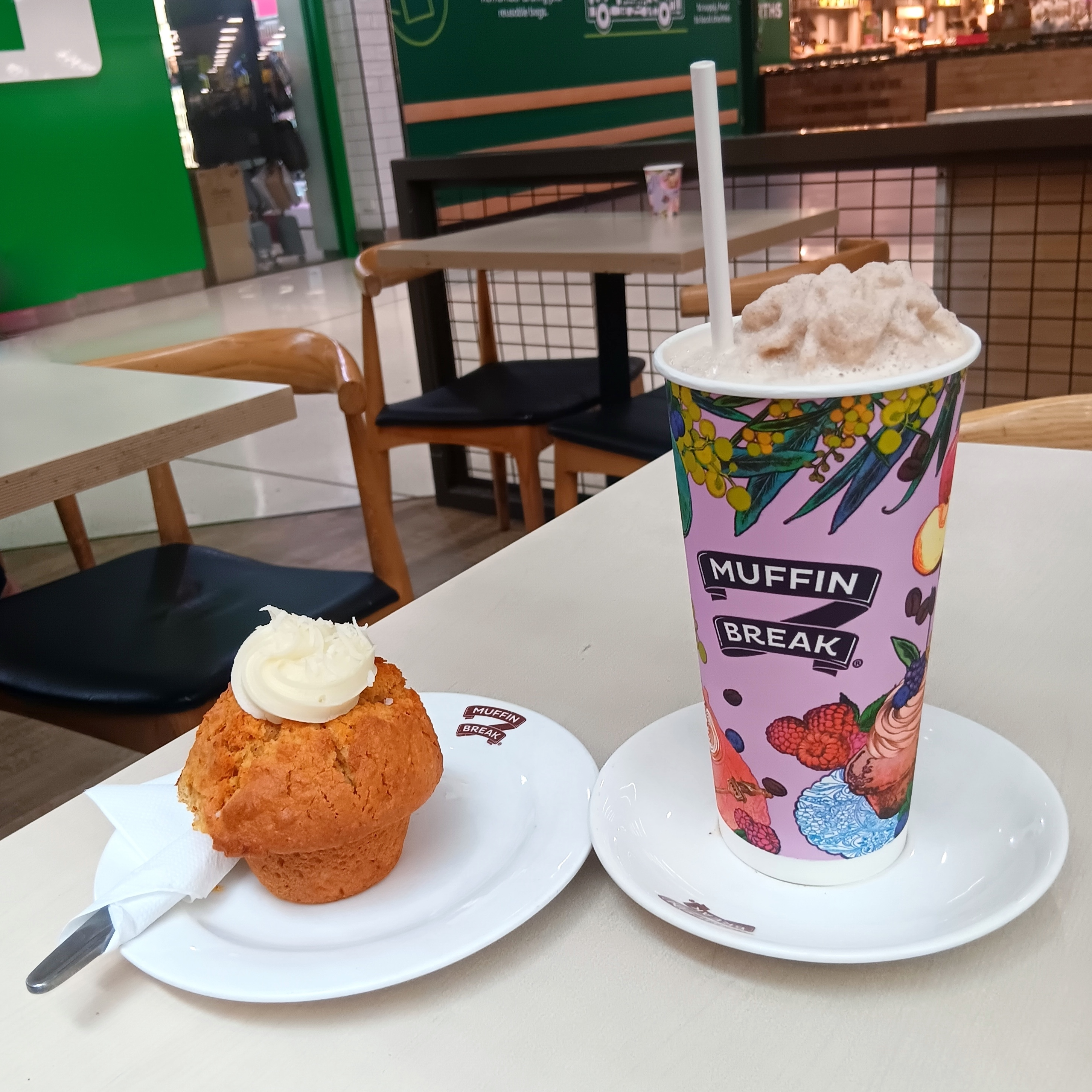
Muffin and latte

The first Muffin Break store in New Zealand opened in Auckland in 1994. Muffin Break entered the UK market in 2001.

In December 2015, a partnership was made between Foodco and Croc's Playcentres, an Australian family entertainment centre franchise. The partnership saw Muffin Break cafes included in all new Croc's Playcentres and existing Croc's franchisees given the opportunity to convert their cafes to Muffin Break cafes.

== Labour practices ==
In 2014, an investigation by the Fair Work Ombudsman found a 24-year-old student working at two franchised Victorian stores had been underpaid almost $20,000. The store owners agreed to repay the employee and entered into an enforceable undertaking with the Ombudsman.

In 2016, the former owners of a franchised Hobart store were investigated by the Ombudsman and found to have underpaid two employees over $46,000 between April 2014 and December 2015. The store owners agreed to repay the employees and entered into an enforceable undertaking with the Ombudsman.

On 23 February 2019, Muffin Break General Manager made headlines when she spoke about young people not wanting to work unpaid internships, telling a journalist: "There's just nobody walking in my door asking for an internship, work experience or unpaid work, nobody." These comments were later refuted by the journalist who wrote the original story as being misinterpreted "She never said she expected all of her employees to work for free, as many online seem to be suggesting, only that those who put themselves forward to do unpaid work were more likely to get a job".

In September 2019, the Australian Fair Work Ombudsman found that franchisees of Jamaica Blue and Muffin Break cafés had underpaid 166 employees a total of over $26,000.

In April 2023, Wage Inspectorate Victoria charged a Muffin Break franchise in Melbourne with 360 child labour offences relating to three employees under the age of 15.

== Cage-free eggs ==
In October 2024, FoodCo has released a statement where they claim they are "committed to the ongoing evolution of our supply chain, to ensure that we are operating sustainably, and with our corporate social responsibility at front of mind".
