= Cibo Espresso =

Adelaide, South Australia coffee franchise

Coordinates: 34°55′21″S 138°36′28″E

CIBO Espresso
- Company type: Subsidiary
- Industry: Food and Beverage
- Founded: 2000; 26 years ago in Adelaide
- Headquarters: South Australia, Australia
- Area served: Australia
- Parent: Gloria Jean's Coffees
- Website: ciboespresso.com.au

Cibo Espresso, commonly Cibo (pronounced: ˈtʃibo), is a café and coffee shop franchise based in Adelaide, South Australia. Formerly owned by parent company Retail Zoo, it was sold to Gloria Jean's Coffees in 2024.

== Founding ==
It was founded in 2000 by Roberto Cardone, Angelo Inglese, Salvatore Pepe and Claudio Ferraro, and grew to 20 locations before being sold to Retail Zoo in 2012. It subsequently grew to 28 locations in South Australia along with one each in NSW, Victoria and Queensland. The café aimed to deliver traditional Italian food made from local ingredients in an Italian atmosphere.

The chain had significant brand loyalty in Adelaide when compared to the local outlets of larger chains such as Starbucks, Gloria Jean's and Hudsons Coffee.

The company sponsored an Adelaide cycling team, Team Cibo.

At the time of the chain's 2024 sale it comprised 22 shops, which the purchasers intended to transition to branches of Gloria Jean's by mid-2025.

== See also ==
- List of coffeehouse chains
- List of Italian restaurants
- South Australian food and drink
