= Astor Theatre, Perth =

Heritage-listed movie theatre in Mount Lawley, Western Australia

Astor Theatre Perth
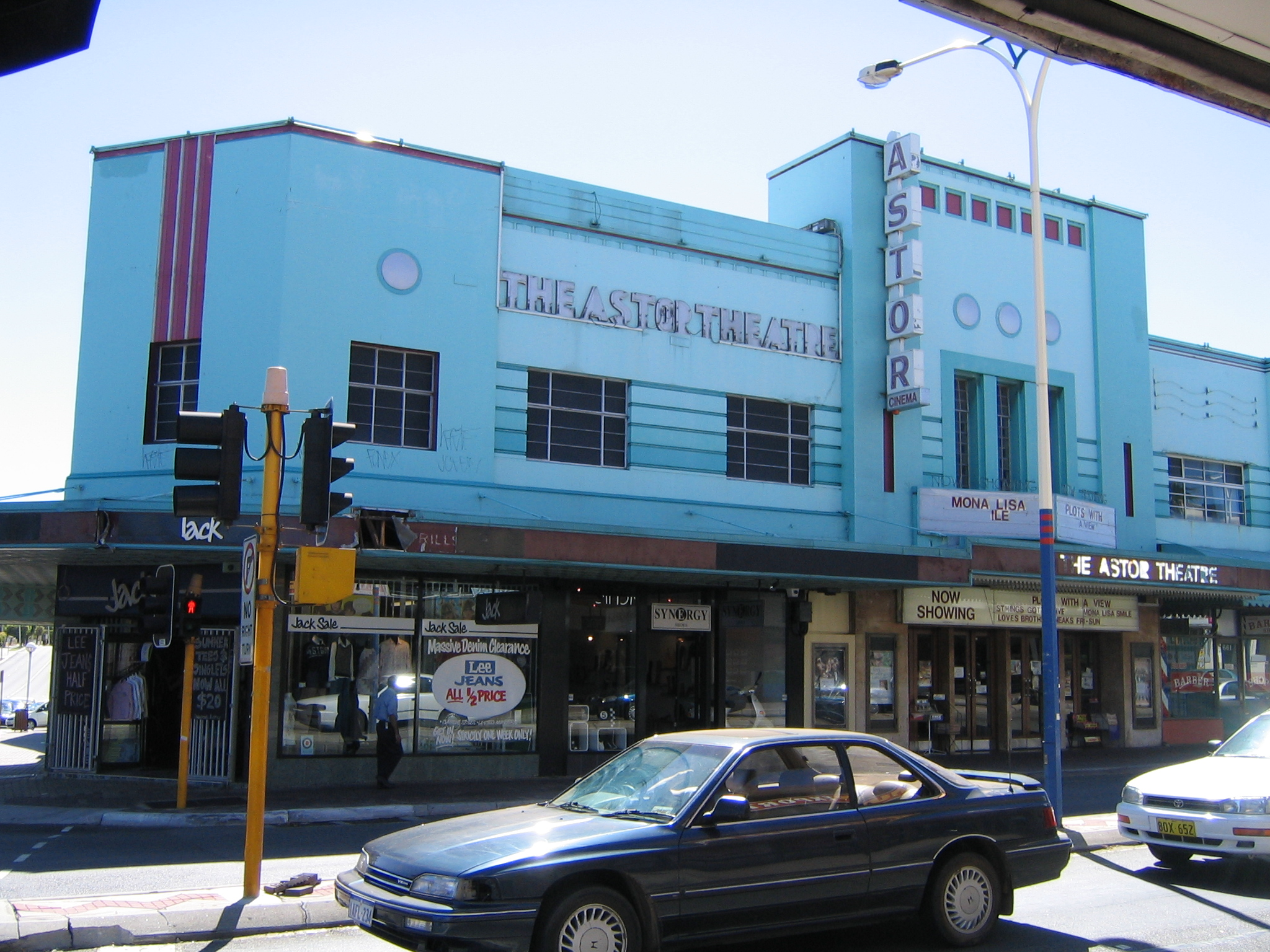
- Astor Theatre, Mount Lawley
- Interactive map of Astor Theatre Perth
- Location: Mount Lawley, Western Australia
- Coordinates: 31°56′03″S 115°52′20″E
- Type: Heritage-listed theatre and retail building

Website
- www.astortheatreperth.com

Western Australia Heritage Register
- Designated: 14 May 1999
- Reference no.: 2425

The Astor Theatre is located at 659 Beaufort Street, Mount Lawley, Western Australia. It comprises a single, two and three-storey masonry inter-war Art Deco style theatre and retail building.

== History ==
The building was originally known as the Lyceum Theatre and was designed by David McClure, and built by Simon Alexander, whose family owned the premises. The Alexander family also owned the Alexander Building on the south-west (opposite) corner of Beaufort and Walcott Streets. It was constructed in 1914/1915 in a Federation Free Classical architectural style and was designed for a mixture of vaudeville and lantern slide shows.

By 1922, the Lyceum Theatre was advertising "motion pictures and popular orchestra". In the mid-1920s, with the development and popularity of silent movies, the Lyceum was converted to a cinema, and the name was changed from the Lyceum to the State Theatre.

In 1939 the theatre was redesigned in an Art Deco style by William Leighton, and reconstructed by Simon Alexander's son John. In the late 1930s Leighton secured a reputation as a leading cinema designer for his work on several Perth cinemas, including the Piccadilly Theatre and Arcade, the Windsor Theatre in Nedlands, and the Como Theatre in South Perth. He was also behind the refurbishment of the Royal Theatre and Grand Theatre. The remodelling of the State Theatre left it structurally intact but altered its appearance, "dispensing with the arches and pediments and imposing a simple restrained facade". The alterations included the entrance to the picture garden, and made provision for a grocery store on the corner, a millinery shop, and refreshments in the cinema vestibule. Leighton's Art Deco design introduced the Mayan flower to the Theatre. The Art Deco theme runs from the Main Auditorium through the external facades to Beaufort and Walcott Streets. The remodelled State Theatre opened on 12 May 1939.

The Astor Theatre received its current name in 1941 when an Act of Parliament decreed it an offence for a private business to use the name "State". Mr John Alexander's wife, Mavis, renamed the theatre The Astor in memory of a theatre of the same name in New Farm, Brisbane that was the first cinema they went to after their marriage.

With the decline in cinema attendances in the 1950s and 1960s due to the introduction of television, the Astor Theatre became a shadow of its former self, eventually reduced to showing pornographic films. It was also used as a venue for a number of activities including amateur dramatic shows, a dancing studio and bingo. In December 1978, Astor Theatre was purchased by a group of Perth businessmen and families. In 1988 rumours grew that Astor Theatre was to be demolished, and Ron Regan, from Sydney, arranged a five-year lease of Astor Theatre through his company Entrevision Pty Ltd.

In 1989, the 50th anniversary of its Art Deco redevelopment, the Theatre underwent an extensive refurbishment by Philip McAllister, Architect for Entrevision Cinemas Pty Ltd, who wished to return the cinema to its Art Deco glory and provide a quality film experience in a quality environment.

The Astor Cinema was officially re-opened on 26 July 1989 by the mayor of the City of Stirling, Cr. A. A. Spagnolo, prior to a screening of Australian director Peter Weir's film Dead Poets Society.

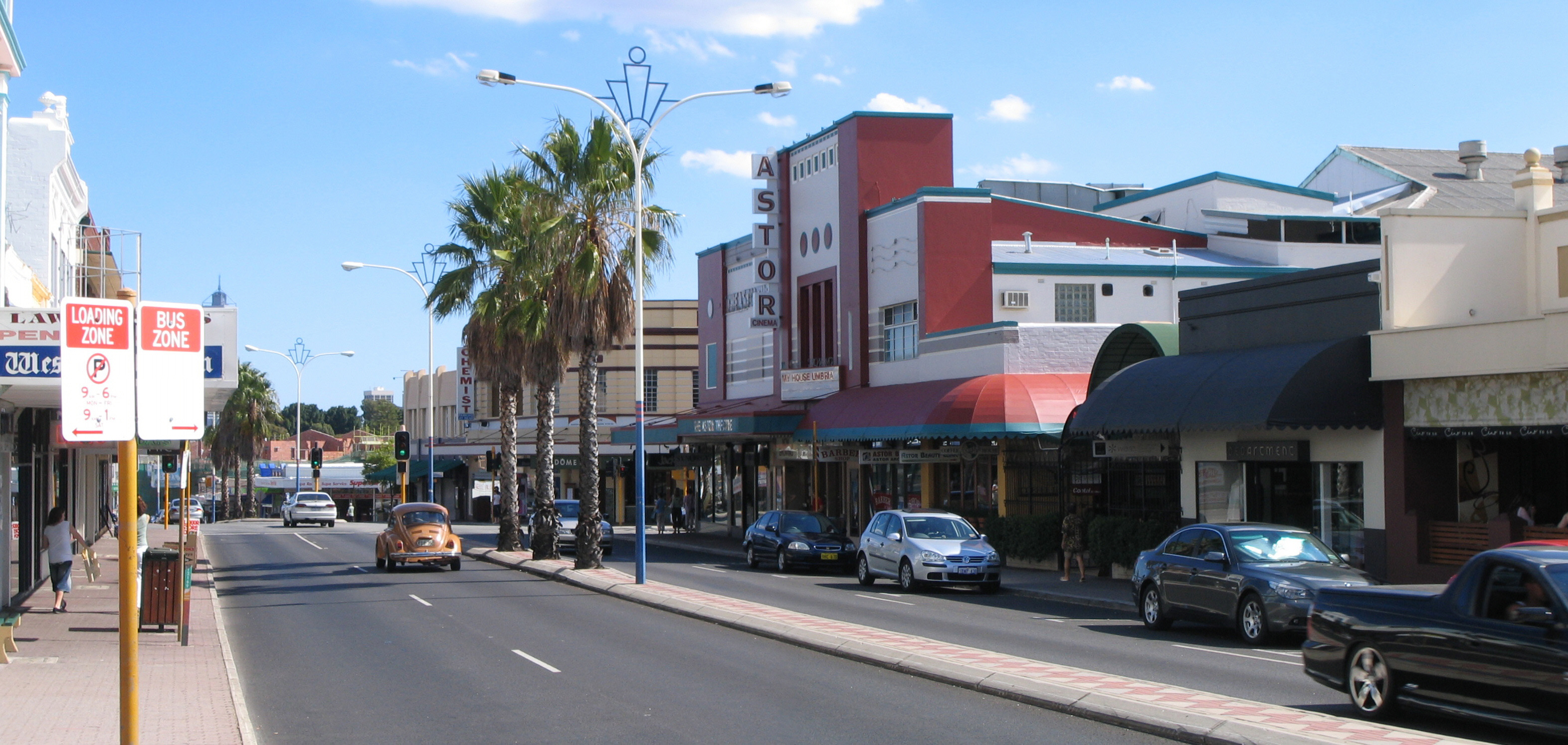
Astor Theatre, Mount Lawley

=== 21st century ===
Since its reopening, the Astor Theatre has undergone further refurbishment in November 2006, with the cinema facilities continuing to be upgraded. In August 2008, the owners announced that the cinema would close because it is no longer profitable, stating that "the cinema had been running at a loss for some time, with just $34 in takings in four hours of trading". A Music Rocks Australia concert (a kid rock band group of schools) was one of the last performances at the Astor.

The theatre reopened in October 2009, and now hosts live music, comedy and other community events.

== Heritage value ==
The Astor Theatre was classified by the National Trust (WA) on 1 August 1988. The building is also included on the City of Stirling Municipal Inventory. and was permanently listed on the State Register of Heritage Places on 14 May 1999.
