= Como Beach =

Beach in Perth, Western Australia

- Beach
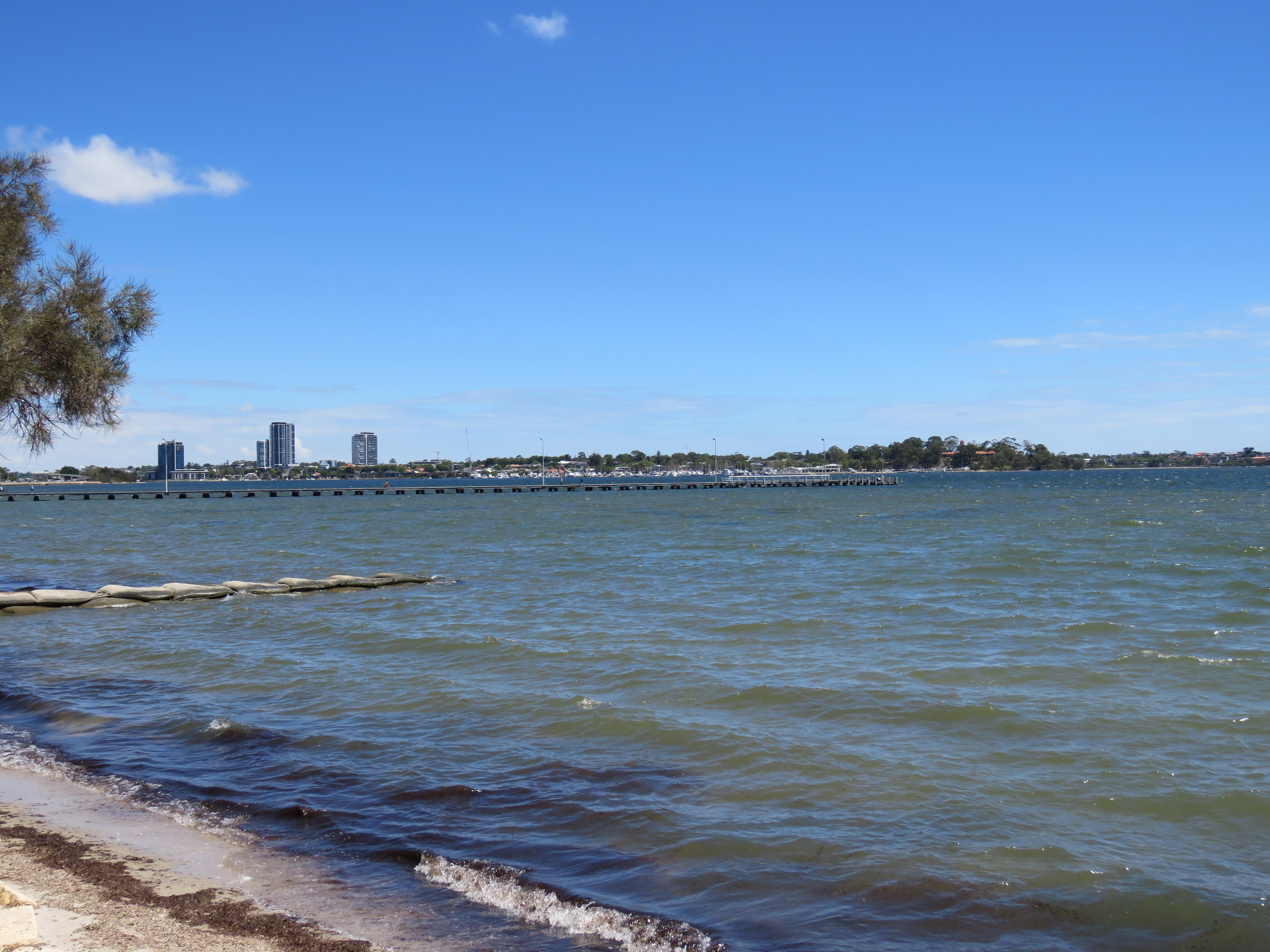
- View of Como Beach with Como Jetty in the background
- Interactive map of Como Beach
- Coordinates: 31°59′32″S 115°51′13″E
- Location: Como, Western Australia
- Water bodies: Swan River, Western Australia

Como Beach is an estuarine beach in Como, Western Australia located on the Melville Water section of the Swan River. It is located at the end of Preston Street between South Terrace and Cale Street running parallel to the Kwinana Freeway.

Como Beach and the Como Jetty were added to the State Register of Heritage Places in November 2000 for their "aesthetic value" and historical significance.

== History ==
The area was originally known as Beenabup ('a place for digging holes') to the Noongar people containing a woodland of Banksia and Nuytsia trees used for nectar. Fish traps were dug along the shoreline with archeological evidence existing up until the construction of the Kwinana Freeway in 1956.

By the end of the 19th Century, Como Beach had become popular for swimming and camping. In 1905 the land between South Terrace, Thelma Road and Canning Highway (formerly Fremantle Road) was subdivided by Mark Gardiner and named Como Estate. Part of this was sold to Frank Edgecumbe who promoted the foreshore as a recreational area.

In 1907, the 300 metres (1,000 ft) Como Jetty was built for Como Estate for approximately £1,500. The length of the jetty made the area accessible to most boats on the Swan River, and soon a ferry route ran from Barrack Street Jetty to Applecross Jetty via Como Jetty. This ferry link popularised Como Beach as a holiday and recreation destination for Perth residents. The jetty was also used by the South Perth Yacht Club.

In 1909, the portion of land which became Como Reserve was donated to the Municipal Council by Frank Edgecumbe. To further promote the area, the Council held events including the Gala at Como. The location was declared a public beach in 1911. Camping facilities were improved during this time, including seats and firewood. The beach became a popular owing to its white sand and calm waters.

During the Interwar Period a sharp increase in retail development including tea rooms, dance pavilions and lodging houses began along Melville Parade (formerly Melville Terrace). This includes the state heritage listed Pagoda Ballroom in 1926, and Como Theatre which opened as Cygnet Theatre in 1938. An application to build a pub was rejected in 1928 as it was felt it could attract undesirable behaviour. A swimming club was established in 1929. Tram routes began to service Como Beach from Mends Street Jetty via Labouchere Road, and from Perth via The Causeway, with both routes running until 1950.

The scouting movement was active in the area from the 1920s. In 1933, headquarters and facilities were built on the foreshore for the 5th WA Group (Sea Scouts) Como, later the 1st Como Group WA.

In 1956 construction began on the Kwinana Freeway, with the first section and Narrows Bridge opening in 1958. The route used public and undeveloped land where possible, including a section of Como Beach, which was cut off from the rest of Como. The Sea Scouts headquarters was demolished as part of the works. The beach began to decline as a recreational and swimming area. A pedestrian bridge was constructed at the end of Preston Street to service the beach.

In 1982, due to its poor condition, Como Jetty was completely rebuilt by the Public Works Department. The swimming enclosure was removed for safety reasons in 1997, despite public opposition. The City of South Perth continued to develop Como Beach including upgrading the Preston Street pedestrian bridge in 2002, and installing public artwork commemorating the history of the area in 2007.

The Como Sea Scouts continue to be active at Como Beach. A new facility was constructed at the south end of Como Beach and is accessible by a pedestrian bridge from Olives Reserve.

== See also ==
- Young, Michael (1994). Como Beach : the Manly of the West.
