= Como Theatre =

Heritage listed cinema in Como, Western Australia

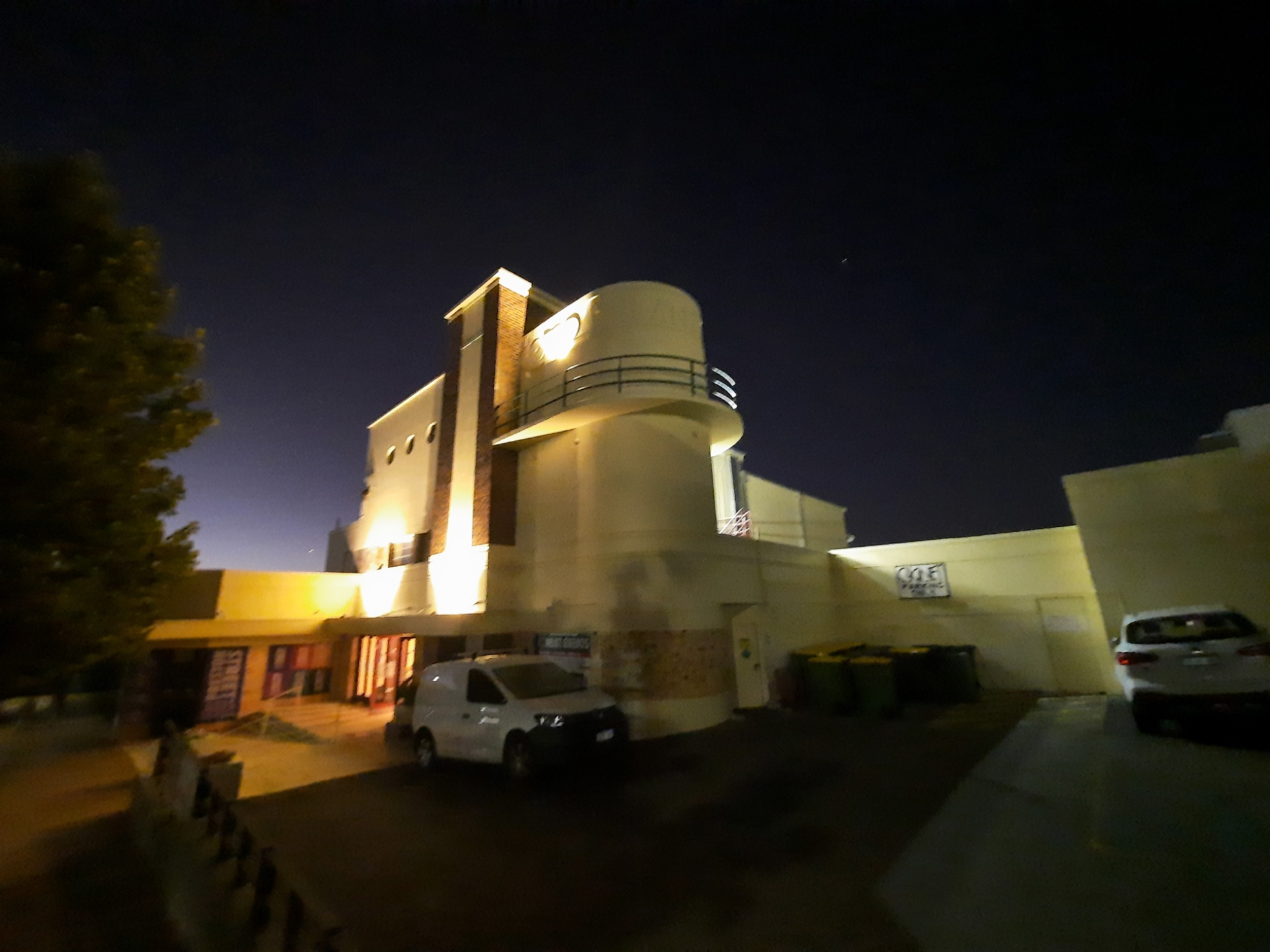
- Como Theatre
- Former names: Cygnet Cinema
- Alternative names: The Revival House

General information
- Architectural style: Streamline Moderne
- Location: Preston Street, Como, Western Australia, Australia
- Coordinates: 31.9935°S 115.8583°E
- Current tenants: The Revival House
- Completed: 4 March 1938
- Renovated: 2018
- Client: James Stiles (Grand Theatre Company)
- Owner: Australian Property Collective

Design and construction
- Architects: Baxter Cox and Leighton

Western Australia Heritage Register
- Type: State Registered Place
- Designated: 30 June 1995
- Reference no.: 2404

Como Theatre (operating as The Revival House and previously known as Cygnet Cinema), is located at 16 Preston Street, Como, Western Australia. It was the first purpose built sound cinema in the suburbs immediately south of the city in the inter-war period. The theatre opened in 1938 and was built by local identity and film entrepreneur James Stiles. It is an excellent example of the art deco style of architect William Leighton and is included on the State Register of Heritage Places.

== History ==
The Como Theatre was built in 1938 for James Stiles of the Grand Theatre Company. Formerly a real estate agent, Stiles moved into the cinema industry to save one of his assets, the Grand Theatre, which faced ruin in the wake of the stock market crash in 1929. With the boom in cheap entertainment, the Grand Theatre Company soon became a very successful company. In 1938, Stiles managed to secure a ten-year lease on Piccadilly Theatre, modernised his existing cinemas and built Como Theatre.

In the late 1930s South Perth had developed as a desirable, respectable riverside suburb. Como Beach was a popular recreation area for families, and a ferry service to the city left from the Como jetty at the bottom end of Preston Street.

The 1930s were also a boom period for entertainment. Attending the cinema was a popular pastime and an escape from the poverty of the Great Depression. A number of cinemas were built, not only in the city centres of Perth and Fremantle, but also in the suburbs. The Cygnet Theatre was not the first cinema in the South Perth area; it was preceded by the picture shows held twice weekly at the Swan Street Hall (1922), the Gaiety Picture Theatre on the corner of Coode and Angelo Streets (1926) and the Hurlingham Picture Theatre on Canning Highway (1933). The Gaiety and Hurlingham were still in operation when the Como Theatre opened in 1938 as the most modern and up-to-date-cinema in the district, screening talkies for the first time.

The theatre was officially opened on 4 March 1938 by the Chairman of the South Perth Road Board, G. V. Abjornson. It was designed by William T. Leighton, the well-known interwar architect, and built by W H Ralph and Sons. In the late 1930s Leighton secured a reputation as a leading cinema designer for his work on several Perth cinemas, including the Piccadilly Theatre and Arcade, the Windsor Theatre in Nedlands, and the Astor Theatre in Mount Lawley. He was also behind the refurbishment of the Royal Theatre and Grand Theatre. The Como Theatre originally had both an indoor auditorium and an outdoor picture garden, which was serviced by one mechanised bio box. The tram and ferry services brought people from outside the area to the cinema.

The theatre was renamed the Cygnet Theatre in the 1960s to associate it with the black swan logo of the Festival of Perth. Despite the name change, the original Broadway face type lettering stating The Como Theatre around the bio box still exists. The entrance and foyer of the cinema were rearranged in 1964, with the entry doors shifted west of the original entrance, and the original entrance area was converted into part of the confectionery counter. Air conditioning was installed in the cinema in October 1968 to combat the threat of television, but patronage continued to drop and the picture garden was demolished within a year. In 1981 alterations were made to the auditorium, with the seats in the front stalls removed and the other seating realigned.

In August 2004, the Heritage Council of Western Australia provided a A$4,500 grant to prepare a conservation plan for the cinema. In 2018, A$2.5 million was spent making the building safe as the western wall and ceilings were at risk of collapse.

Following owners Grand Cinemas entering administration in December 2022, the theatre went independent and began operating as the Revival House, showing old films using 16 mm or 35 mm film.

== Architectural character ==
The theatre reflects the architectural style popular in the inter-war period, using nautical motifs such as wavy lines, smooth flat curves and tubular handrails, with an architectural emphasis on both the horizontal and vertical aspects of the building.

The Como Theatre is an example of the Inter-War Functionalist style. Characteristics of this style are the asymmetrical massing of smooth geometric elements, and emphasis on exterior form reflecting internal function. The prominent central tower housed the bio box, which serviced both the indoor auditorium and the outdoor picture garden. Film canisters were hauled up to the bio box balcony from the street. The tower extends out in a fashionable streamlined curve and features a cantilevered balcony with steel railings, resembling the form of a modern ocean liner. The "liner" theme is reinforced by the three "port hole" windows on the exterior of the building. The stylistic influence of Le Corbusier, a functional Modernist architect, is evident in these forms and detail.

In the summer of 2013, American street artist Nils Westergard painted a portrait of Alfred Hitchcock on the western facing exterior wall of the building.

== Heritage value ==
The Como Theatre was entered into the Register of the National Estate by the Australian Heritage Commission on 27 October 1998 and was classified by the National Trust (WA) on 2 May 1988 as the Cygnet Theatre. The building is also included on the City of South Perth's Municipal Inventory and was permanently listed on the State Register of Heritage Places on 30 June 1995.
