= The Movie Masters Cinema Group =

Western Australian cinema group

The Movie Masters Grand Cinemas Ace Cinemas
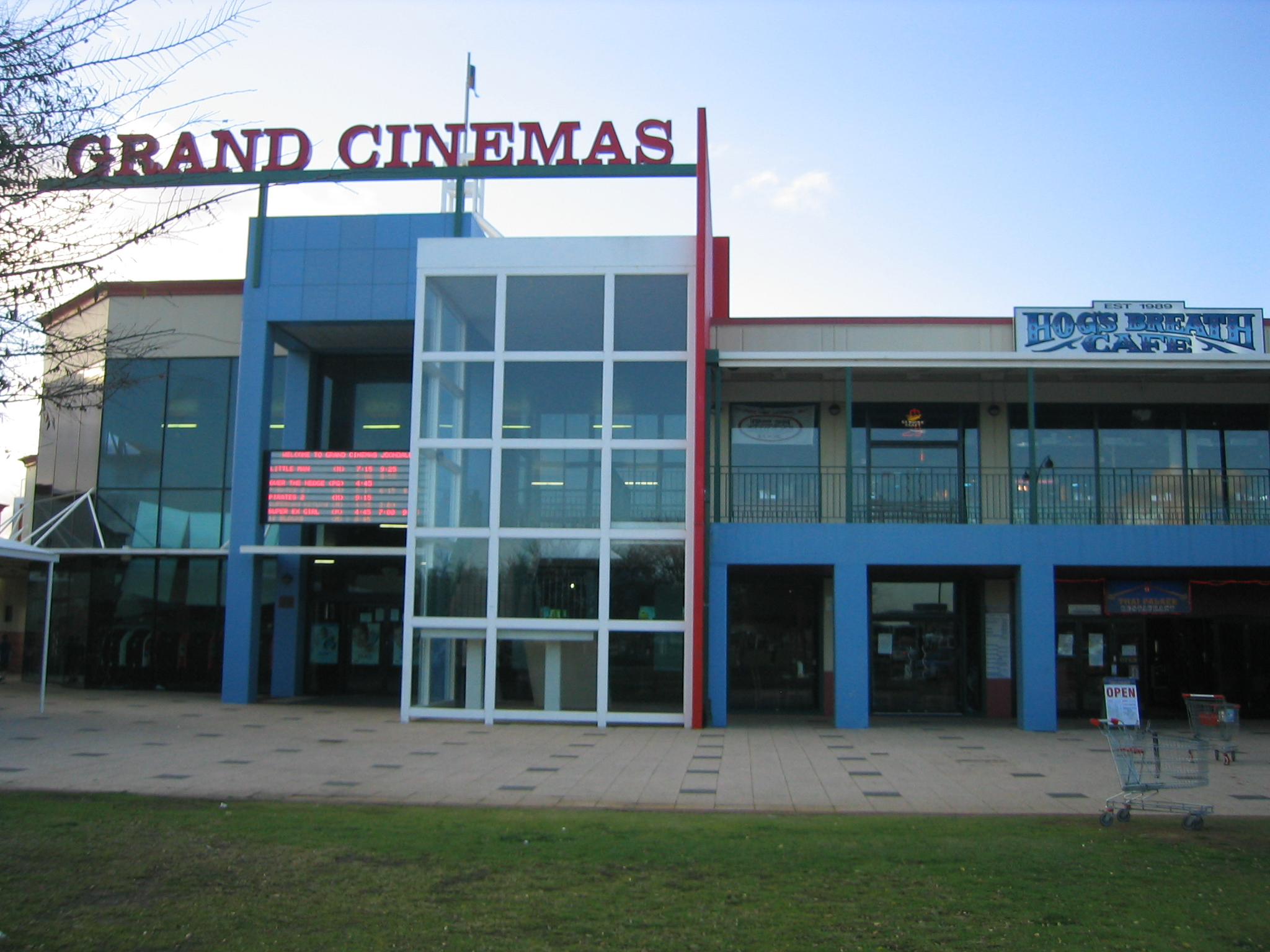
- Grand Cinemas in Joondalup (now operated by Hoyts)
- Industry: Cinema
- Founded: 1932 (Grand Cinemas); 1950s (Ace Cinemas)
- Headquarters: Australia
- Products: Cinemas
- Brands: Grand Cinemas, Ace Cinemas

Grand Cinemas and Ace Cinemas are independent Western Australian chains of cinema multiplexes. The chains formerly co-operated under The Movie Masters banner, but as of 2022 they no longer operate under this arrangement.

In 2022, Grand Cinemas entered administration, eventually selling most of its cinemas to Hoyts.

== History ==
The Movie Masters Cinema Group was formed in the 1990s as a co-operative initiative between two locally owned and operated Western Australian cinema companies, Ace Cinemas and Grand Cinemas. The Movie Masters brand was initially formed to allow Ace Cinemas and Grand Cinemas to effectively compete against multi-national exhibition chains such as Greater Union and Hoyts.

=== Ace Cinemas ===
Ace Cinemas (originally Australian Cinema Enterprises) was founded as one of Australia's first drive-in operators in the 1950s, and had a number of drive-in theatres across metropolitan and rural Western Australia. They opened Perth's first cinema multiplex, the 3 screen Cinecentre, in 1974.

Ace began a partnership with Hoyts in 2023, with the companies joining forces to revitalise Ace's Midland and Rockingham locations, and to open a new cinema at Morley.

=== Grand Cinemas ===
Grand Cinemas (originally The Grand Theatre Company) was founded by businessman James Stiles in 1932, spun-off from Town and Suburban Properties Ltd, a real estate company that had purchased the struggling Grand Theatre. The company was formed to take over running of the cinema after the previous tenants, Union Theatres (the precursor to Greater Union), had defaulted on their lease.

In their early decades the company operated a number of cinemas in Perth, including the Grand Theatre, the Theatre Royal, and the Princess Theatre in Fremantle. They also constructed the Piccadilly Theatre, and the heritage-listed Como Theatre in Como, opening both in 1938. In 1954 the company was renamed to City Theatres, and were brought out by television station TVW in 1973, though Arthur Stiles, the nephew of James Stiles, remained in charge of the company. On 6 November 1980 they opened the Cinema City complex opposite the Perth Town Hall; that same day the Grand Theatre shut down and the building was later demolished in March 1990. Cinema City would later operated by Hoyts before its demolition in 2008.

In 1993, the renamed Grand Cinemas started expanding their suburban locations, beginning with the launch of their cineplex at Warwick, offering the first suburban cinema complex in Perth's upper northern suburbs (prior to that patrons had to travel to the Innaloo Greater Union complex further south). In 1996 they expanded to Bunbury, and in the following years opened a number of cineplexes including taking over two former Greater Union sites in Hillarys and Joondalup. As of 2022 the business remains owned by the Stiles family.

In November 2022, Grand Cinemas announced that it had called in administrators from FTI Consulting after being financially impacted by the COVID-19 pandemic, and immediately closed its Armadale and Joondalup cineplexes as a result. In December 2022, their three remaining operating cineplexes at Currambine, Warwick and Bunbury were sold to Hoyts. The cinemas would remain operating under the Grand name before being rebranded in early 2023. In April 2023, Hoyts announced that they would also take over and reopen Grand's former Joondalup cineplex. Reading Cinemas took over and reopened Grand Cinemas' former cineplex at Armadale in January 2023. The company also relinquished control of Cygnet Cinema at the historic Como Theatre, which became independent as The Revival House.

== Locations ==
The Movie Masters operated and was based solely in Western Australia.

=== Ace Cinemas ===
- Midland (Midland Gate, co-operated with Hoyts)
- Morley (Galleria Shopping Centre, to open in 2026, co-operated with Hoyts)
- Rockingham (Rockingham Centre, co-operated with Hoyts)

==== Former locations ====
- Perth (Cinecentre, Cinema Capri, Cinema Paris)
- Subiaco
- Busselton (now operated by Orana Cinemas)
- Kalgoorlie (now operated by Orana Cinemas)

=== Grand Cinemas ===
==== Former locations ====
- Como Theatre (operated as Cygnet Cinema, now independent as The Revival House)
- Perth (Grand Theatre, Theatre Royal, Piccadilly Theatre, Cinema City)
- South Perth (Hurlingham Theatre)
- Fremantle (Princess Theatre)
- Hillarys (Westfield Whitford City, demolished and replaced by Event Cinemas at the same site)
- Armadale (Armadale Central, now operated by Reading Cinemas)
- Joondalup (Lakeside Joondalup, now operated by Hoyts)
- Currambine (Currambine Central, now operated by Hoyts)
- Warwick (Warwick Grove, now operated by Hoyts)
- Bunbury (now operated by Hoyts)

== Experiences ==
=== Gold Lounge ===
==== Ace Cinemas Gold Lounge ====
The Ace Cinemas Gold Lounge is a luxury cinema located in the two biggest auditoriums at Midland and Rockingham. The concept was revealed in the 1990s when the Midland complex was first opened. The two seating areas are accessed via a private lounge containing a fully licensed bar. Patrons can order food and drinks during a screening. Due to WA law stating that people under 18 years of age cannot enter a licensed area without a parent and/or guardian present, the company does not allow anyone under the specified age access to the Gold Lounge.

==== Grand Cinemas Gold Lounge ====
The first Grand Cinemas Gold Lounge opened at their Warwick cineplex in 2014; it contained 2 screens and a bar. In 2016, Grand Cinemas Currambine opened with two Gold Lounge auditoriums. In 2023, the two Gold Lounges at Warwick and Currambine were replaced by and refurbished as Hoyts LUX lounges after the locations were acquired by the Hoyts company.

== See also ==
- Australian Theatres
- Event Cinemas
- Reading Cinemas
- Village Roadshow
- Warner Village Cinemas
