= Theatre Royal and Metropole Hotel =

Heritage-listed former theatre and former hotel in Perth, Western Australia

Coordinates: 31°57′17″S 115°51′33″E

The Theatre Royal and Metropole Hotel is a heritage-listed building in Perth, Western Australia, located at 637–645 Hay Street. Both the hotel (also known as Hotel Metropole) and the theatre were built by businessman Thomas Molloy, completed in 1893 (133 years ago) and 1897 (129 years ago) respectively.

== History ==
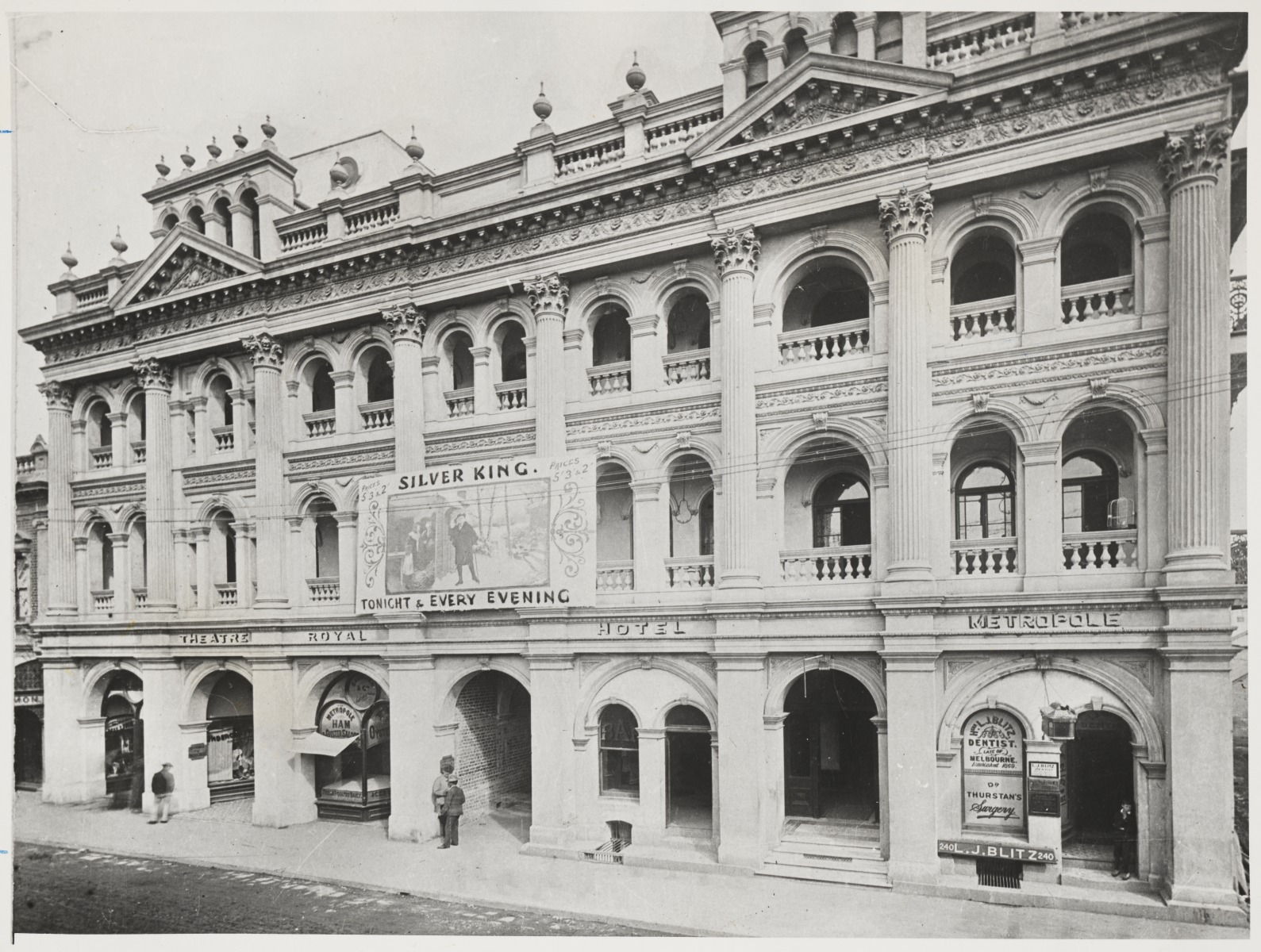
Theatre Royal and Hotel Metropole in 1897

Local businessman Thomas Molloy was instrumental in attracting finance and commissioning some of Perth's early cultural buildings. Up until the 1890s, Perth had no theatres, and actors performed in either the Perth Town Hall or in St George's Hall, described by The West Australian in 1891 as a place "where there is much that is unsuitable" and "the most significant proof of the old-time backwardness and poverty of Western Australia". At the time, Western Australia had 53,177 people—a figure that was to double within the next five years. On 20 September 1893, Molloy purchased Perth Lot F3 on the south side of what is now Hay Street Mall with the assistance of Alexander Forrest, then the Mayor of Perth, and obtained a publican's licence a week later. In 1894, the Hotel Metropole was constructed on the site, and in February 1895, he announced plans for a 1,000-seat theatre to be built on land adjoining the hotel. The foundation stone was laid by Mrs A. Forrest on 8 May 1895, and the Theatre Royal opened on 19 April 1897. While its initial success was mixed, due mainly to the changing economic and demographic characteristics of Perth, by the 1930s it had become the most popular picture theatre in Perth.

Theatre Royal was the first venue in Australia to have Continental Wondergraph Company's new cinema technology demonstrated, in November 1909. It was the company's intention to have a limited season in Perth before proceeding to the eastern states, and it later established a cinema chain in Adelaide, South Australia.

In 1934, the Grand Theatre Company acquired the lease of the Theatre Royal. This marked the end of live performances, and the exclusive use for cinematic shows. Refurbishments in 1939, costing approximately £A 7,800, equivalent to A$770,200 in 2022, modernised the venue, made it more suitable for film viewing, and contributed to its popularity.

The theatre, but not the hotel, was purchased by City Theatres (Note: City Theatres was the family company of James Styles, who was in charge of the Grand Theatre Company when it formed in the early 1930s.) in 1954, and underwent further renovations in 1965, including the removal of the gallery and its supporting steel beam, which had spanned the entire width of the building. A 12-metre-wide (40 ft) curved screen was installed, along with a stereophonic sound system. The cinema was reopened by the Perth Lord Mayor Charles Veryard with a screening of My Fair Lady.

The Metropole Hotel was purchased by lingerie company Sussan in 1962, who extensively renovated the building. The ground floor was turned into an arcade with shopfronts, while large open spaces were created in the upper levels through the removal of interior walls.

The Theatre Royal closed in 1977, and the ground floor was redeveloped into shops. In 1983, Hoyts Cinemas used the former dress circle as an additional fourth cinema, with direct access from their location in the adjacent St Martins Arcade.

The heritage value of the Theatre Royal and Metropole Hotel has been officially recognised since the 1970s. It classified by the National Trust of Australia on 7 August 1978, and was given a permanent entry on the Register of the National Estate on 28 September 1982. It was included as a permanent entry on the Register of Heritage Places on 1 October 1999.

== Architecture ==
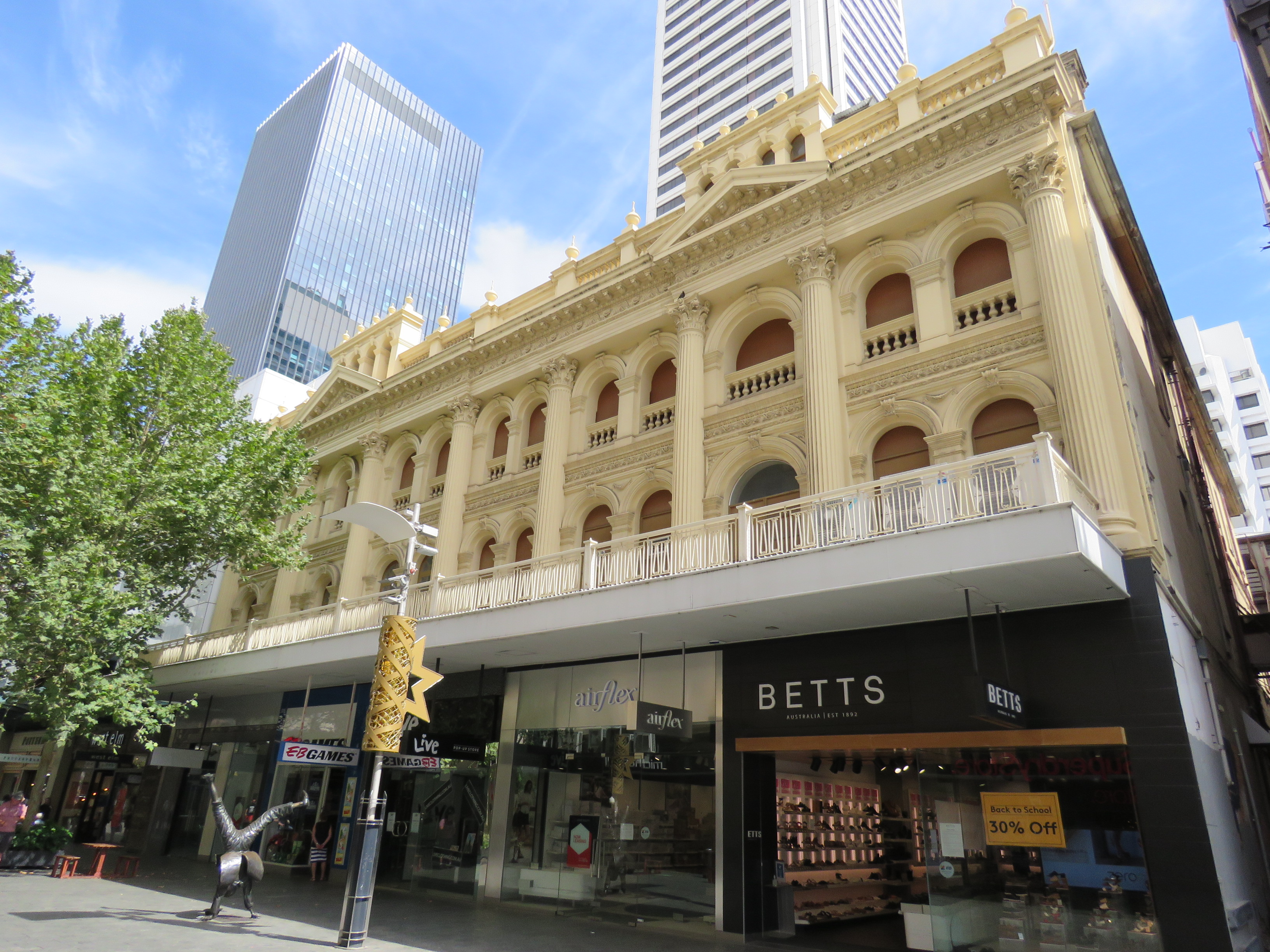
Theatre Royal and Hotel Metropole in 2021

The Metropole Hotel was designed by Henry Stirling Trigg, a prominent architect during the gold rush era. It featured an American Romanesque style facade, underground cellar, and was three storeys tall. A vestibule, saloon bar, parlours and commercial spaces were located on the ground floor, while the first floor had a music saloon as well as drawing, dining, and billiards rooms. The upper level featured the guest lounge, sitting rooms, and bedrooms, with further bedrooms in the attic. The flat roof was used for concerts, and also held a water tank.

John Stuart Jackson was the architect for the Theatre Royal. Molloy chose Jackson due to his previous experience with theatres, having refurbished the Exhibition Theatre in Geelong after taking on the lease in 1883. The theatre was separated from the hotel by a right of way, but connected with verandahs and internal chambers. The facade was designed to match the hotel's facade, with intricate detailing. Ventilation was achieved via a sliding roof and air shafts. The building featured shops at the ground floor, to provide additional revenue, while the theatre spaces included a proscenium stage, stalls, dress circle, gallery, vice-regal box, and an orchestra pit. It was also adorned by a 200 light crystal chandelier.

The combined hotel and theatre complex was the largest commercial building in Perth when they were completed. However, they were soon in competition with the Savoy Hotel across the street, developed in 1916. The Savoy had a 1500-seat theatre at the rear of the property, a significantly larger capacity than the Theatre Royal, which could accommodate approximately 800 people.
