= Pagoda (Perth, Western Australia) =

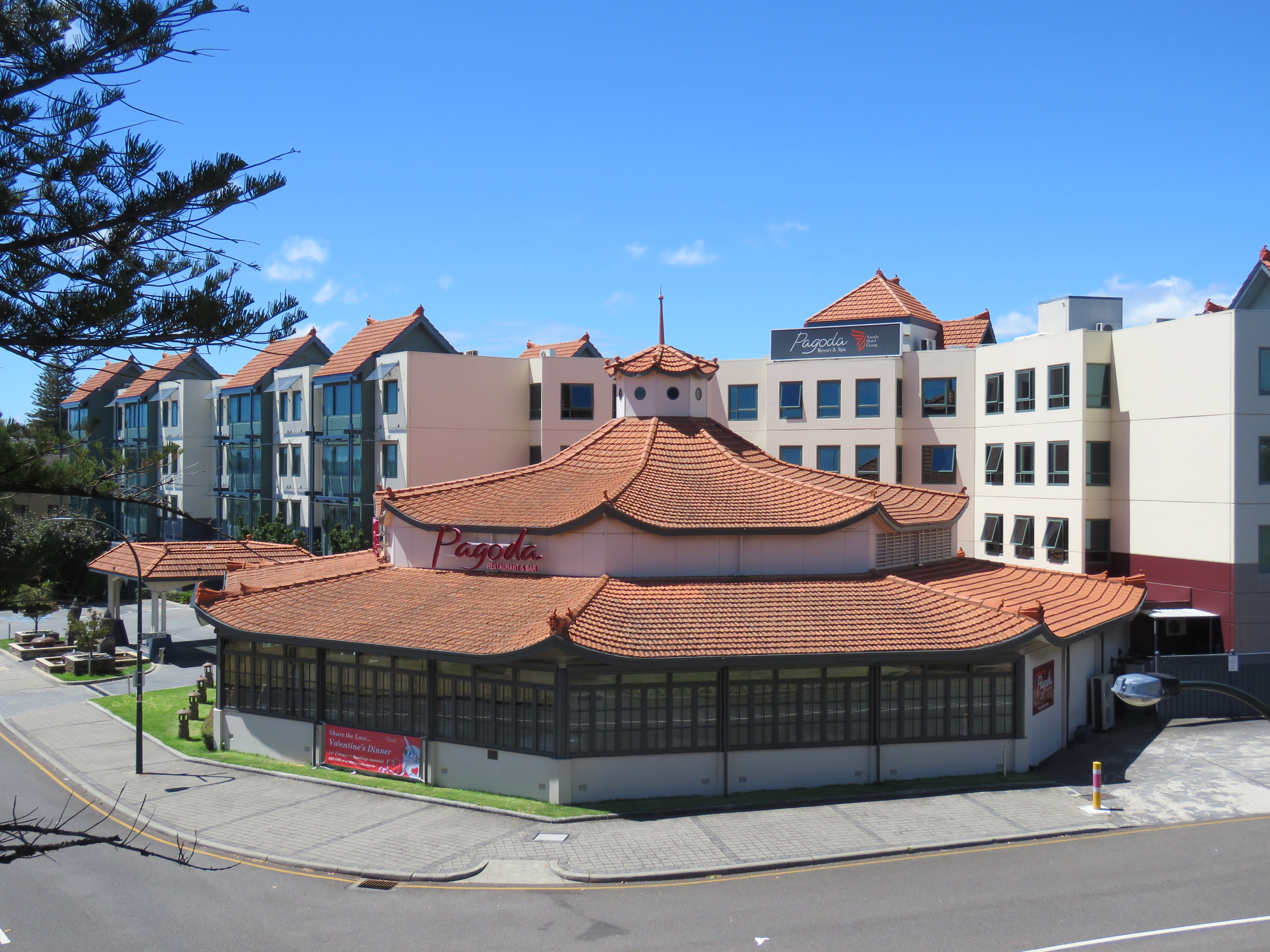
- Pagoda in 2021
- Interactive map of the Pagoda area

General information
- Architectural style: Edwardian Oriental
- Location: 111 Melville Parade, Como, Western Australia
- Coordinates: 31.9909°S 115.8552°E
- Construction started: 1922
- Opened: 26 December 1923

Design and construction
- Architect: Harold Gordon

Western Australia Heritage Register
- Type: State Registered Place
- Designated: 13 May 2005
- Reference no.: 02403

The Pagoda is a State Heritage Listed landmark building in Como, Western Australia. Located on Melville Parade, it is an octagonal building with a three-tiered oriental style roof.

== History ==
The Pagoda was designed and built by Harold Gordon, a prominent Perth hotelier. It is constructed with masonry and tile in an Edwardian Oriental style, and its distinctive three-tiered terracotta roof has made it a notable landmark to locals.

The building initially opened as a ballroom under the name Gordon's Pagoda on Boxing Day 1923. A grand opening dance was held with special tram services departing Perth and a ferry service operated by MV Perth from Barrack Street Jetty, carrying patrons to their destination. It was advertised as "Australia's largest and best appointed ballroom". Dances at the venue were originally overseen by Edson Richard Banks, a notable figure in the Perth entertainment scene prior to World War II. The venue continued to operate as a ballroom throughout the mid-1920s, hosting regular evening dances.

In 1927, the Pagoda was sold to Alexander McAllister Clydesdale, who converted it into a roller-skating rink. In 1929, the building was being used as tearooms and a dance hall.

During the Great Depression, many businesses in the Como area including the Pagoda struggled to remain open. Clydesdale once again opened the building as a roller-skating rink, this time in part ownership with Frank Stiles.

During World War II, the Pagoda was requisitioned for use as a billet. After the conclusion of the war, it was once again used as a dance hall and reception venue.

In 1957, a new dance hall was constructed adjacent to the Pagoda, and the Pagoda building was converted into the foyer of this building. By the 1970s, the original tile flooring of the Pagoda had been replaced with timber.

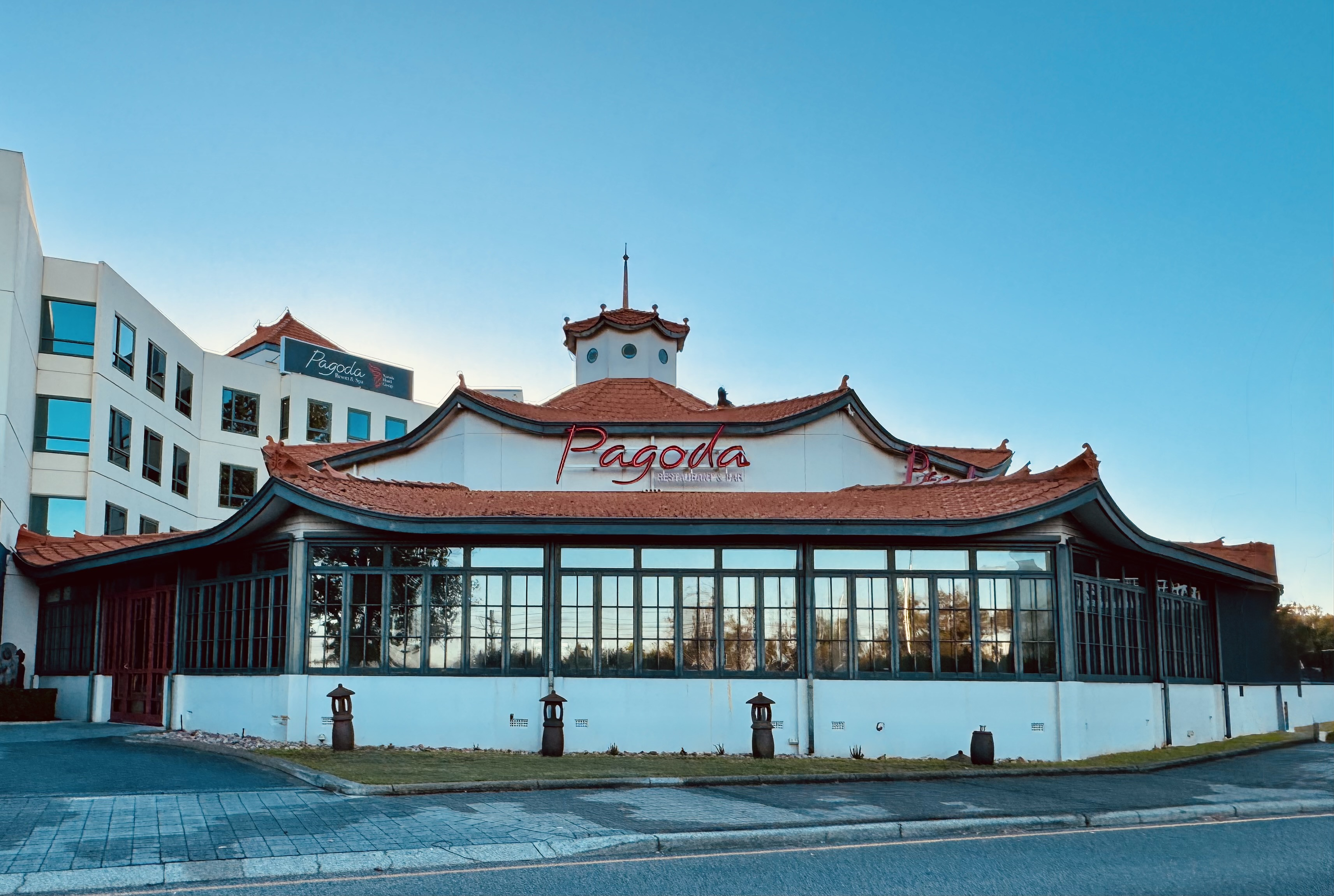
Melville Parade street view (2026)

In 1995, the property was purchased by the Kareelya Property Group. The Pagoda was found to be significantly deteriorated, requiring extensive renovations. In 1998, it was reopened by Premier Richard Court as the Broadwater Pagoda Hotel, with the Pagoda building containing a bar and restaurant.

In 2013, the property was purchased by Narada Hotel Group, and in 2014 it was renamed from Esplanade River Suites to Pagoda Resort and Spa. The Pagoda building is currently used as a reception venue.

== See also ==
- Como Beach
- List of heritage buildings in Perth, Western Australia
- List of State Register of Heritage Places in the City of South Perth
- Category:Heritage places of Western Australia
