= Midland Gate =

Shopping mall in Western Australia

- Midland Gate entrance
- Location: Midland, Western Australia
- Coordinates: 31°53′23″S 116°00′37″E
- Opened: March 1980
- Manager: Fawkner Property; PAG
- Website: Official website

Midland Gate is a shopping centre located in Midland, Western Australia. It is north of Great Eastern Highway, and east of the earlier Midland Junction shopping area that was focused on the Great Northern Highway.

Midland Gate is one of three shopping centres in Western Australia with all three discount department stores – Kmart, Target and Big W, with the other two being Mandurah Forum and Lakeside Joondalup. It has over 200 specialty stores, three supermarkets (Coles, Aldi and Woolworths), a fresh food mall, food court and an eight-screen Ace Cinema Complex.

== History ==
Swan City Shopping Centre opened in March 1980, with Midland Gate as a separate centre and Sayer Street dividing them. Sayer Street closed in the early 1990s and a pedestrian mall was created, which unofficially merged the Midland Gate and Swan City shopping centres together. The first expansion of Midland Gate occurred in 1995, with the structure removed and Midland Gate officially absorbing Swan City.

In the early 2000s expansions were delayed, until the mid-2000s when the delays were no longer present. Redevelopment was celebrated in 2004.

Midland Gate was sold by Colonial First State to Novion in 2015. The centre had a $100 million expansion and refurbishment which began in 2017. Completed in March 2019, the redevelopment saw the arrival of Aldi, JB Hi-Fi, Harris Scarfe and Rebel to the centre.

In September 2023, Fawkner Property and PAG acquired the centre.
