= Bay =

Recessed, coastal body of water connected to an ocean or lake

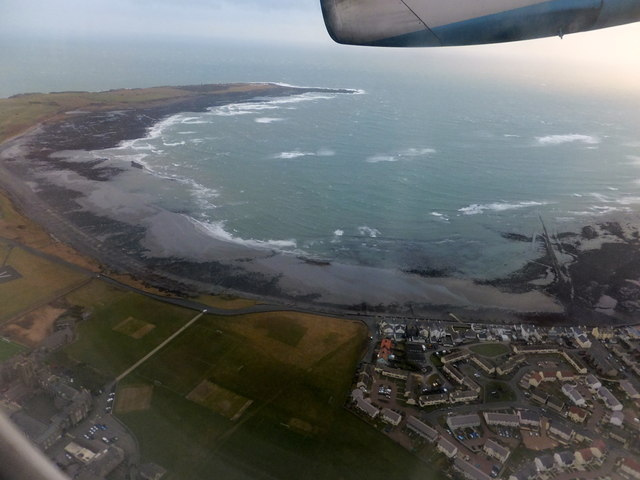
Bay at Castletown, Isle of Man

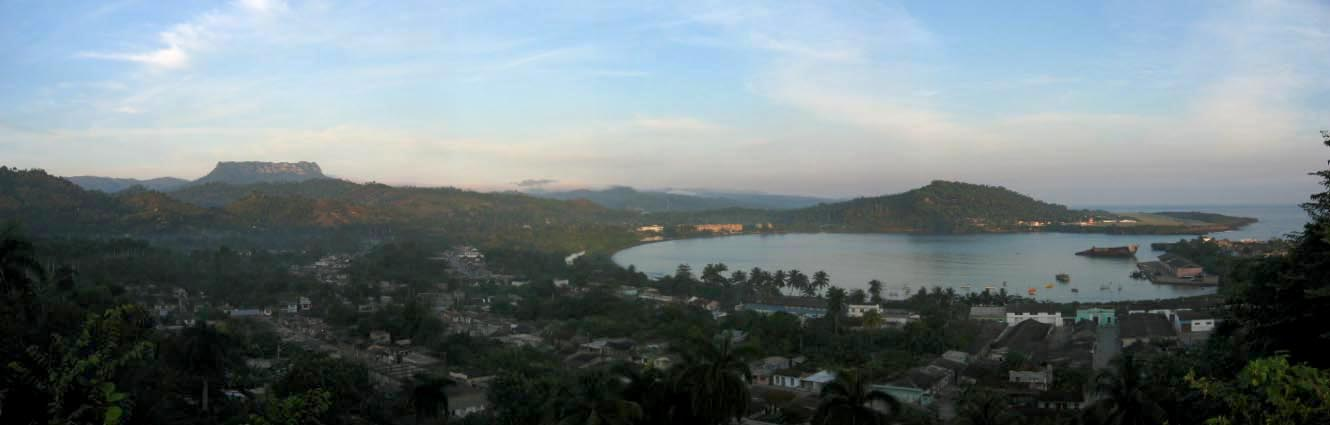
Bay of Baracoa, Cuba

A bay is a recessed, coastal body of water that directly connects to a larger main body of water, such as an ocean, a lake, or another bay. A large bay is usually called a gulf, sea, sound, or bight. A cove is a small, circular bay with a narrow entrance. A fjord is an elongated bay formed by glacial action. The term embayment is also used for, such as extinct bays or freshwater environments.

A bay can be the estuary of a river, such as the Chesapeake Bay, an estuary of the Susquehanna River. Bays may also be nested within each other; for example, James Bay is an arm of Hudson Bay in northeastern Canada. Some bays are large enough to have varied marine geology, such as the Bay of Bengal (2,600,000 km^{2} or 1,000,000 sq mi) and Hudson Bay (1,230,000 km^{2} or 470,000 sq mi).

The land surrounding a bay often reduces the strength of winds and blocks waves. Bays may have as wide a variety of shoreline characteristics as other shorelines. In some cases, bays have beaches, which "are usually characterized by a steep upper foreshore with a broad, flat fronting terrace". Bays were significant in the history of human settlement because they provided easy access to marine resources like fisheries. Later they were important in the development of sea trade as the safe anchorage they provide encouraged their selection as ports.

== Definition ==
The United Nations Convention on the Law of the Sea defines a bay as a well-marked indentation in the coastline, whose penetration is in such proportion to the width of its mouth as to contain land-locked waters and constitute more than a mere curvature of the coast. An indentation, however, shall not be regarded as a bay unless its area is as large as (or larger than) that of the semi-circle whose diameter is a line drawn across the mouth of that indentation (Note: "For the purposes of this Convention, a bay is a well-marked indentation whose penetration is in such proportion to the width of its mouth as to contain land-locked waters and constitute more than a mere curvature of the coast. An indentation shall not, however, be regarded as a bay unless its area is as large as, or larger than, that of the semi-circle whose diameter is a line drawn across the mouth of that indentation. For the purpose of measurement, the area of an indentation is that lying between the low-water mark around the shore of the indentation and a line joining the low-water mark of its natural entrance points. Where, because of the presence of islands, an indentation has more than one mouth, the semi-circle shall be drawn on a line as long as the sum total of the lengths of the lines across the different mouths. Islands within an indentation shall be included as if they were part of the water area of the indentation.") – otherwise, it would be referred to as a bight.

=== Types ===
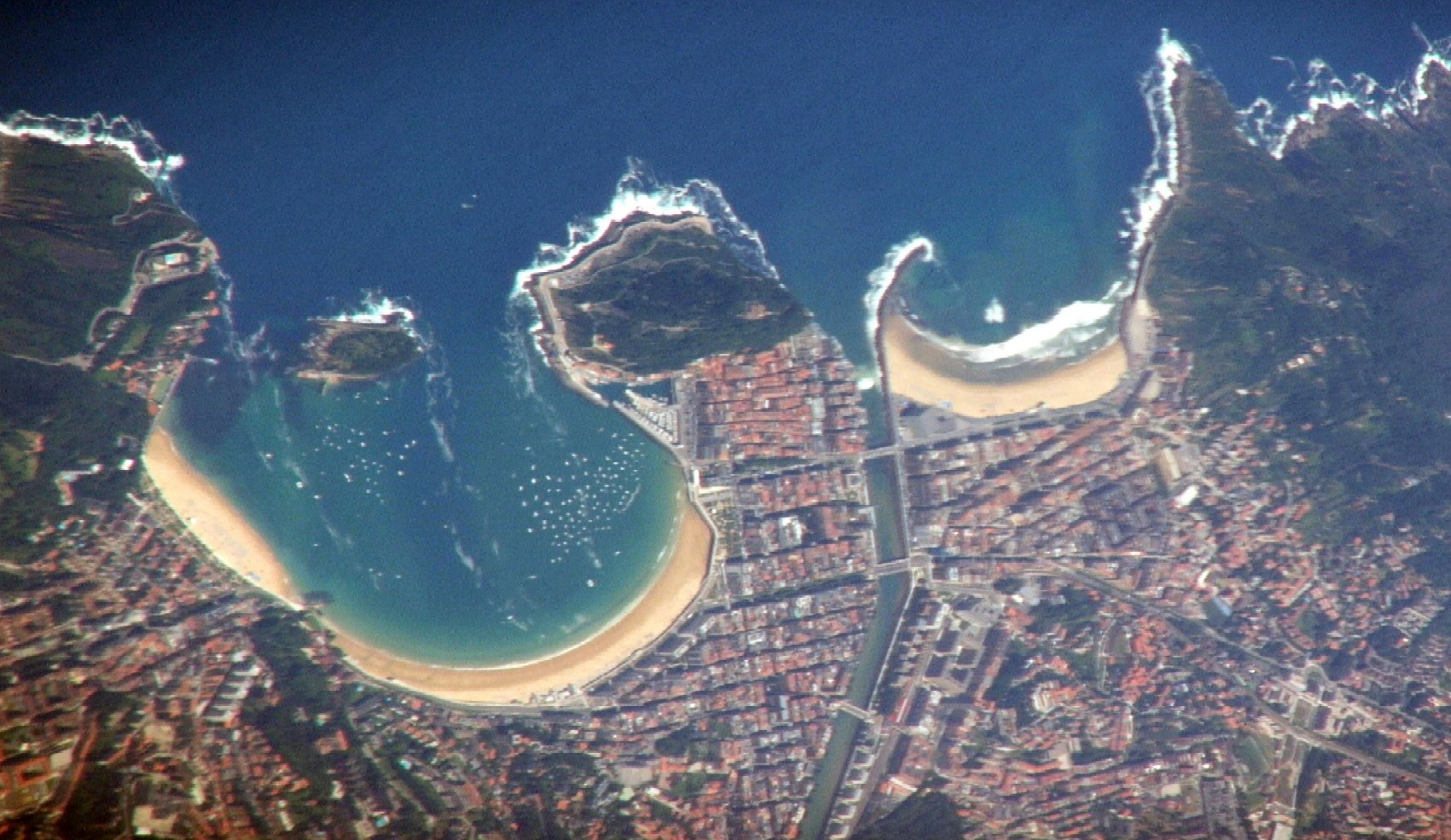
Two adjacent bays at San Sebastián, Spain, one semi-enclosed (left, with an island at the mouth) and one open (right)

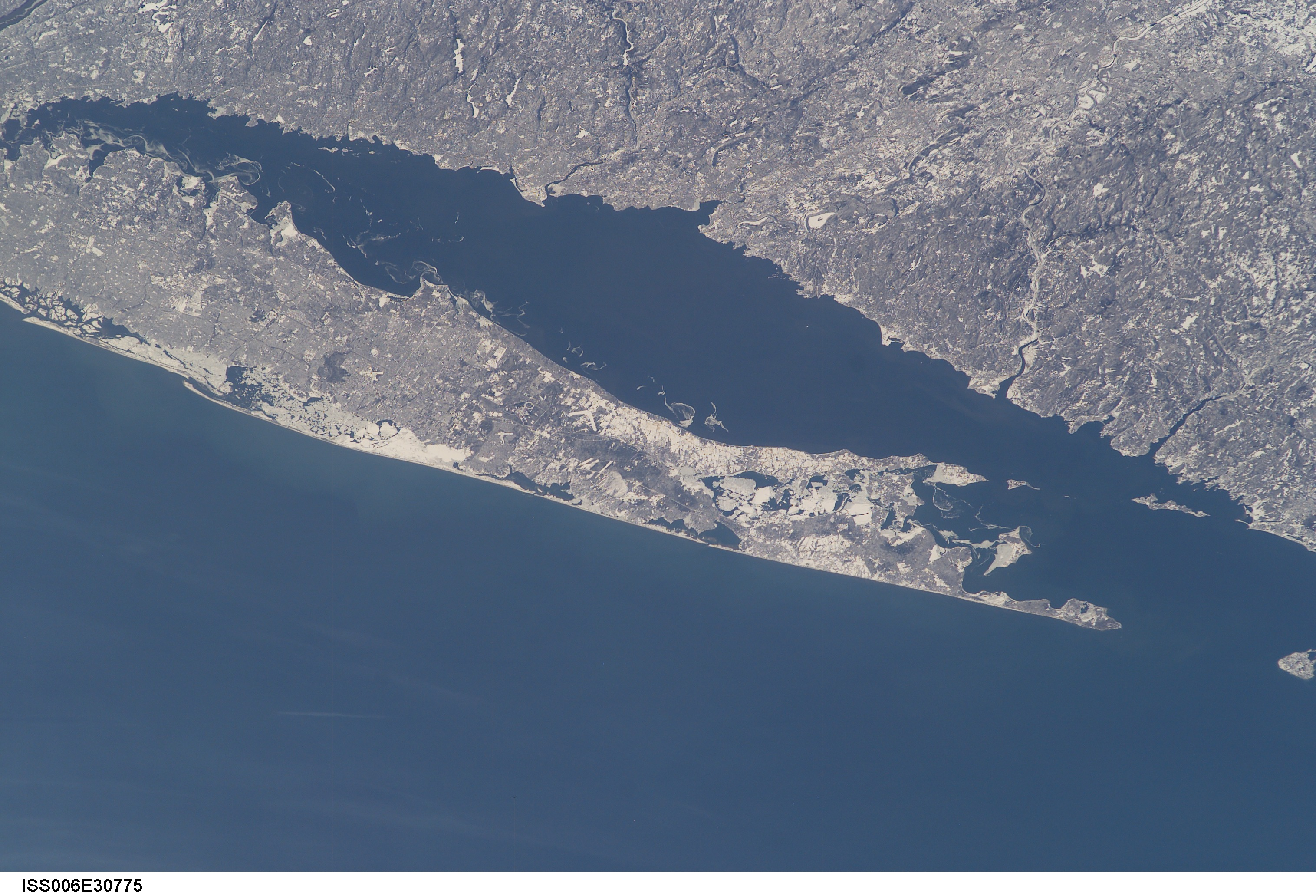
In United States v. Maine (1985), the 110-kilometre-long (68 mi) Long Island Sound was ruled a juridicial bay by the U.S. Supreme Court.

- Open – a bay that is widest at the mouth, flanked by headlands.
- Enclosed – a bay whose mouth is narrower than its widest part, flanked by at least one peninsula.
- Semi-enclosed – an open bay whose exit is made into narrower channels by one or more islands within its mouth.
  - Back-barrier – a semi-enclosed bay separated from open water by one or more barrier islands or spits.
- Juridicial – a legal distinction defining a bay meeting certain criterion as inland waters, and thus the waters of a state, rather than international waters or the territorial waters of a national government a state may be sovereign to. Foremost among the criteria remains that the area impounded by the bay must be greater than that of a semicircle drawn across its mouth.
  Among the matters impacted by the definition are the right to the seabed and its minerals, control over fishing, the right of seafarers to innocent passage, and whether the affected coast is an international border or not.

=== Gulf ===
A gulf is a large inlet from an ocean or their seas into a landmass, larger and typically (though not always) with a narrower opening than a bay. The term was used traditionally for large, highly indented navigable bodies of salt water that are enclosed by the coastline. Many gulfs are major shipping areas, such as the Persian Gulf, Gulf of Mexico, Gulf of Finland, and Gulf of Aden.

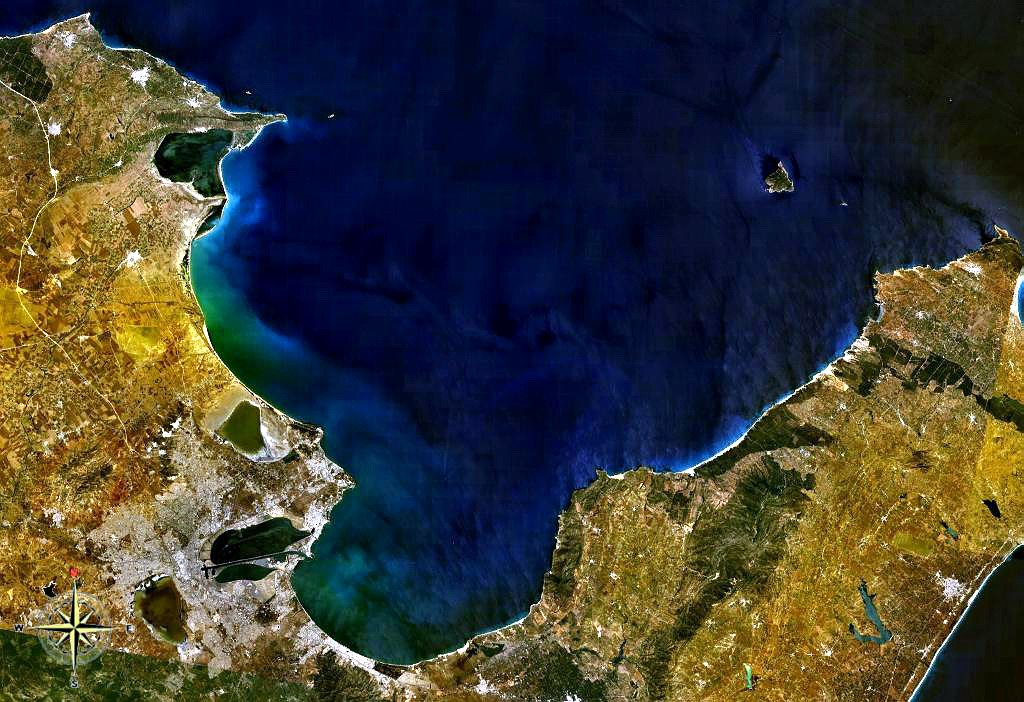
Gulf of Tunis in Tunisia

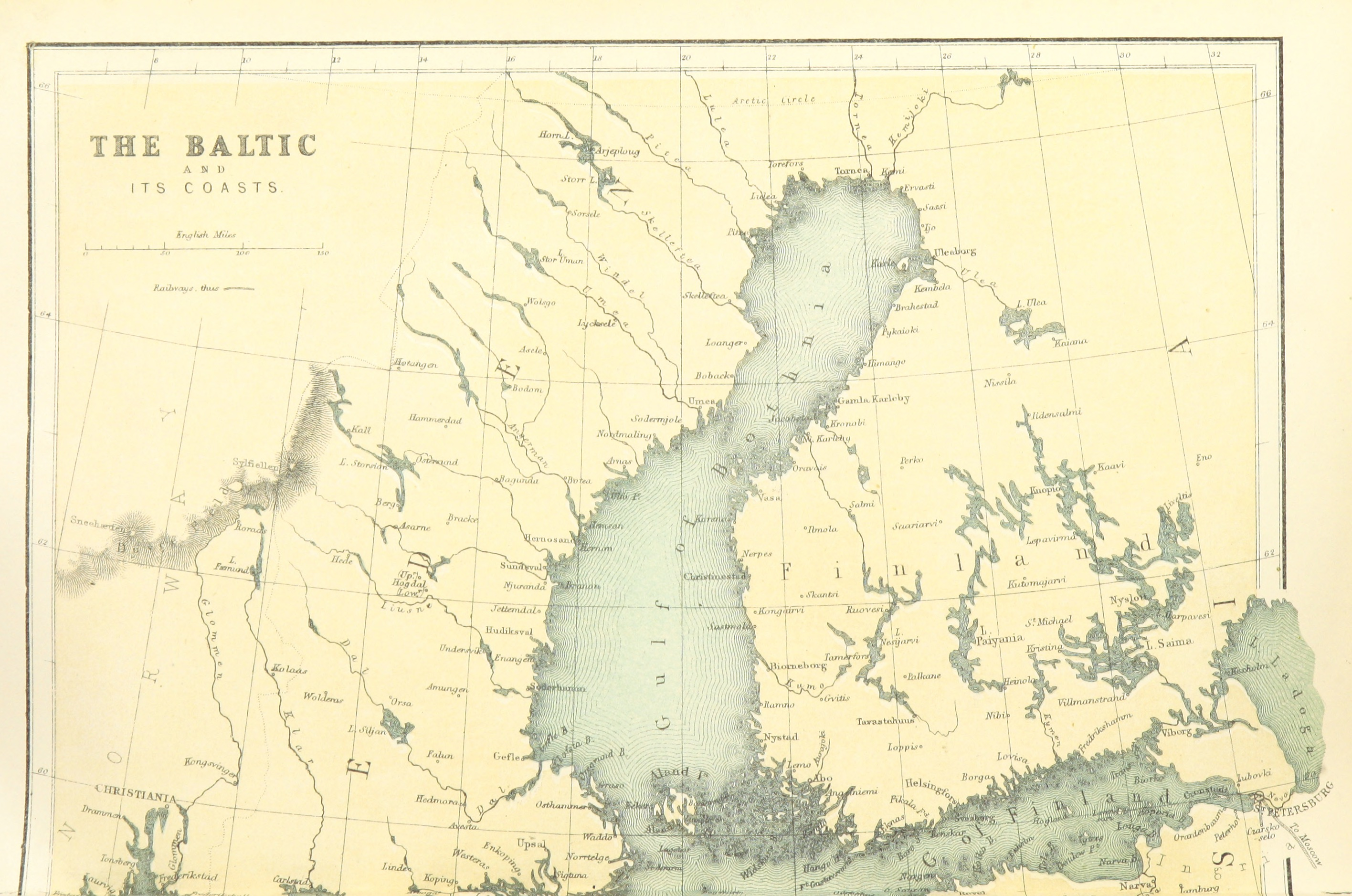
Gulf of Bothnia between Sweden and Finland

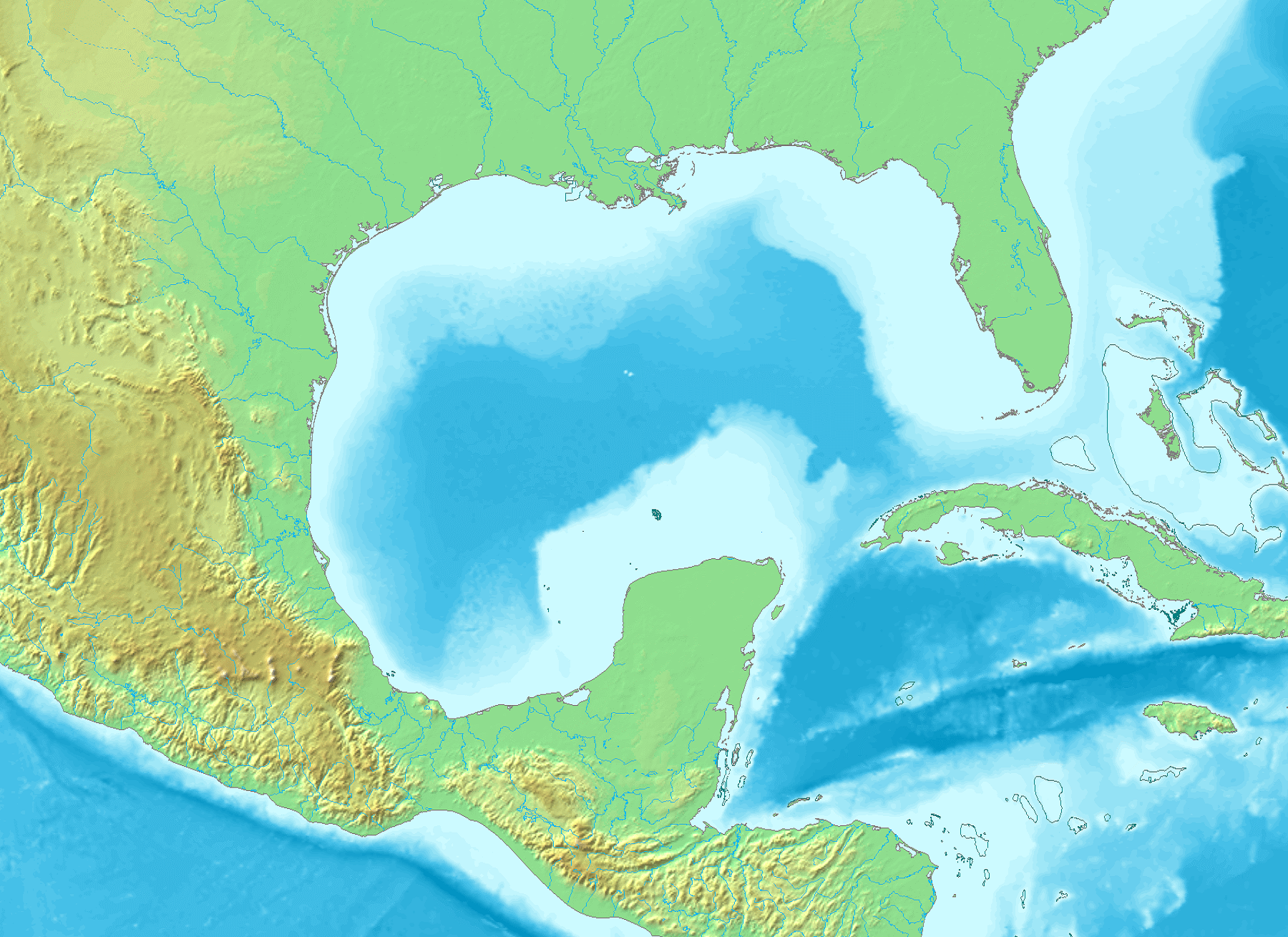
Gulf of Mexico in North America

Gulf of Thailand in Southeast Asia

== Formation ==
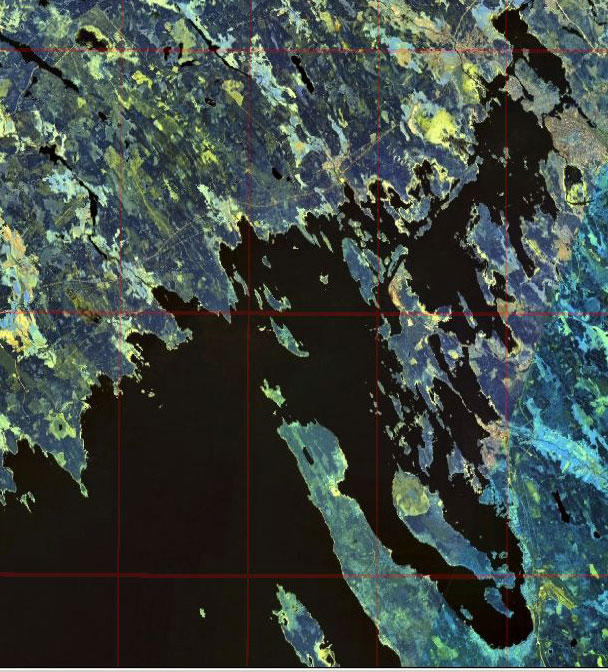
Heavily glaciated Vyborg Bay on the Gulf of Finland

Bays form variously by plate tectonics, coastal erosion by rivers, and glaciers.

The largest bays have developed through plate tectonics. As the Paleozoic/early Mesozoic era super-continent Pangaea broke up along curved and indented fault lines, the continents moved apart and left large bays; these include the Gulf of Guinea, the Gulf of Mexico, and the Bay of Bengal, which is the world's largest bay.

Bays also form through coastal erosion by rivers and glaciers. A bay formed by a glacier is a fjord. Rias are created by rivers and are characterised by more gradual slopes. Deposits of softer rocks erode more rapidly, forming bays, while harder rocks erode less quickly, leaving headlands.

== See also ==
- Bay platform – Dead-end railway platform at a railway station that has through lines
- Great capes – Three major capes of the traditional clipper route
- List of gulfs
