= William T. Leighton =

Australian architect (1905–1990)

William Leighton
- Born: 15 July 1905; Fremantle, Western Australia
- Died: 11 March 1990 (aged 84); Dalkeith, Western Australia
- Education: Fremantle Boys School; Perth Technical College
- Occupation: Architect
- Spouse: Miriam Olga Wight
- Children: Garry
- Parent(s): James Leighton, Margaret née Howard

William Thomas Leighton (15 July 1905 – 11 March 1990) was a Western Australian architect, well known for his Art Deco and Inter-War Functionalist style of civic, commercial and domestic buildings.

Leighton was born in Fremantle on 15 July 1905 and after an apprenticeship at the architectural offices of Allen & Nicholas in Fremantle, was one of the first group of architects to be registered as part of the WA Chapter of the Royal Australian Institute of Architects. Leighton then worked in the architectural offices of Eales and Cohen before joining Bohringer, Taylor and Johnson, who sent him on interstate and overseas commissions. Leighton joined the firm Baxter Cox in 1936 and was later to become a partner until the firm was dissolved in the mid-1940s. Leighton joined the Public Works Department for a short time after World War II, before being offered a partnership with Hobbs, Winning and Leighton. Leighton was president of RAIA (WA) between 1951 and 1952 Leighton retired in 1975.

William Leighton worked on a number of Western Australian cinemas including the Windsor Cinema in Nedlands, the Como Theatre in South Perth, the Princess in Fremantle, and the Piccadilly Theatre and Arcade, Theatre Royal, Metro, Grand and Plaza Theatres in Perth, and the Lyric in Bunbury.,

Leighton died on 11 March 1990 at his Dalkeith residence.

== Sources ==
- Geneve, V. 'William Thomas Leighton: Cinema Architect of the 1930s' in Bromfield, D. (ed.) Essays on Art and Architecture in Western Australia (Nedlands, U.W.A. Press, 1988) p. 12–21 (ISBN 9780864220707)
- William G. Bennett, architect: Articles and notes volume 5, number, December 1992 – January 1993, p. 11
- Geneve, V. 'Obituary: William Thomas Leighton' in The Architect, Vol. 30, No. 2, (Winter 1990) p. 7
- Geneve, V. 'William Thomas Leighton' p. 18; West Australian, 14 March 1990, p. 26 b.
- Waltzing Moderne, Vol. 5, number, December 1992 – January 1993, p. 11

== Notable buildings ==
- State Theatre, Melbourne (c.1930)
- Civic Theatre, Auckland, New Zealand (c.1930)
- Embassy Theatre, Sydney (c.1930)
- Former Piccadilly Theatre (Piccadilly Cinema) and Arcade, Perth (1938)
- Windsor Theatre, Nedlands (1938)
- Como Theatre (Cygnet Cinema), Como (1938)
- Former State Theatre (Astor Cinema), Mount Lawley (1939)
- Fremantle Port Authority Building & Fremantle Passenger Terminal
