= Windsor Cinema =

Cinema in Nedlands, Western Australia

Windsor Theatre
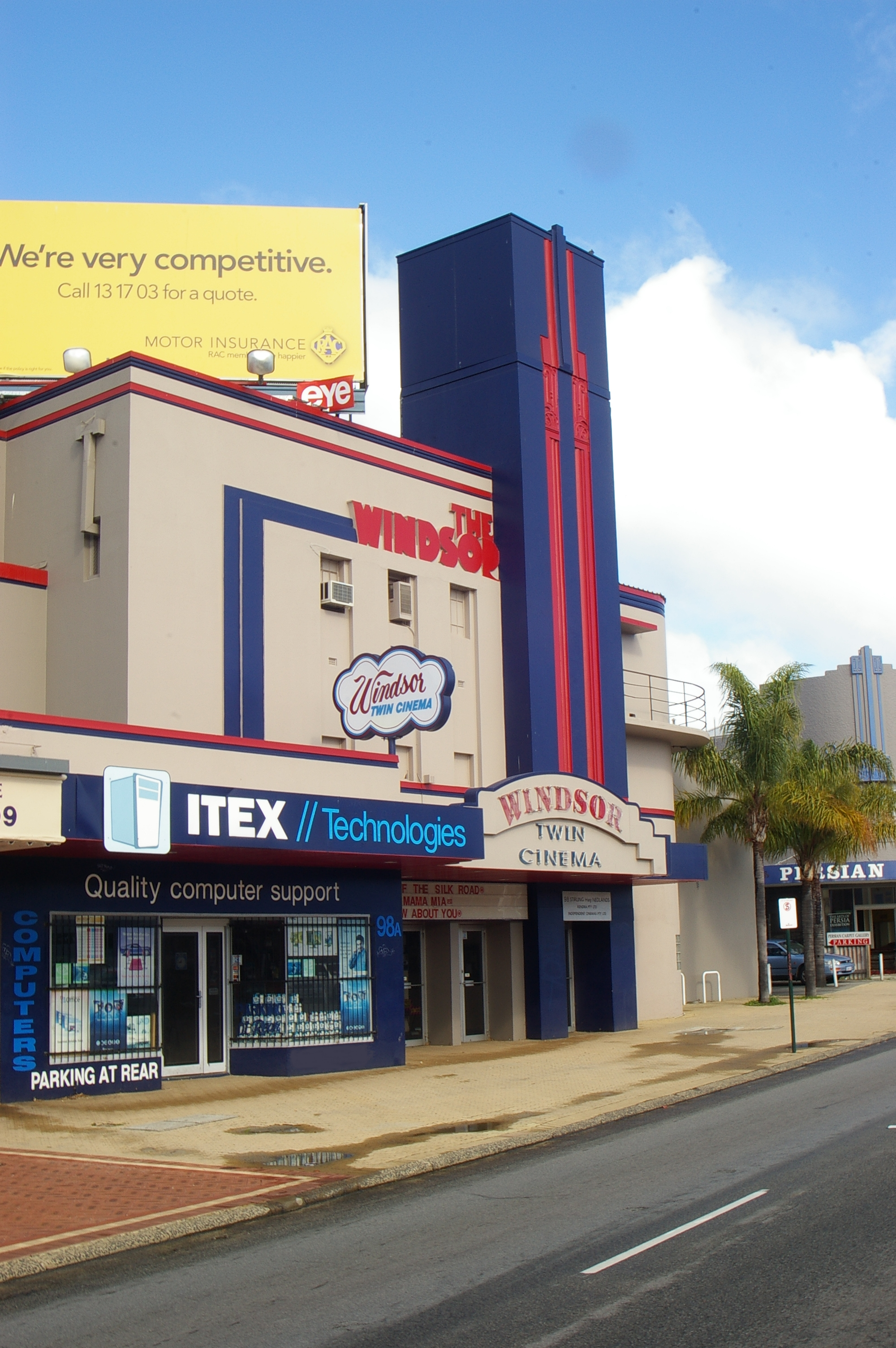
- The Windsor Theatre, Stirling Highway, Nedlands, Western Australia
- Alternative names: Windsor Cinema; Windsor Twin Cinema

General information
- Type: Cinema
- Architectural style: Art Deco
- Location: 98 Stirling Highway, Nedlands, Western Australia, Australia
- Coordinates: 31.9797°S 115.8022°E
- Completed: 1937
- Inaugurated: 10 September 1937
- Client: Claremont District Pictures

Design and construction
- Architect: William T. Leighton
- Architecture firm: A R Baxter-Cox
- Main contractor: W H Ralph & Sons

Website
- www.lunapalace.com.au/cinemas/windsor-cinema

The Windsor Cinema (formerly Windsor Theatre and Gardens and Windsor Twin Cinema) is located at 98 Stirling Highway, Nedlands, Western Australia. It is an Art Deco cinema designed by the architect William T. Leighton and constructed in 1937. It is currently leased by Luna Palace Cinemas.

== History ==
The Windsor Theatre was built in 1937 by W.H Ralph and Sons for E.P Nelson of Claremont District Pictures. It was constructed in brick with rendered and plastered finishes externally and internally. The Windsor Cinema is typical of a number of Australian cinemas built during the 1930s-40s, although the inclusion of a movable projector which could be used to screen films into the adjacent picture garden was unique at its time. It was officially opened on 10 September 1937 by the Chairman of the Nedlands Road Board, Mr. Bennett. The theatre had a seating capacity of at least 800, the largest in the district at the time.

The cinema shared a bio-box with the picture gardens, similar to the Como Theatre in South Perth. This was a world first design for architect, William T. Leighton, who developed the concept of a projecting wing to the main bio-box which when coupled with a trolley rail system enabled the movie projectors to be quickly rolled from the internal to the external garden projection ports and vice versa.

The theatre was operated by Vince Lucus until it was taken over by Independent Film Distributors. The gardens did not survive the introduction of television, and closed in 1968. Extensive renovations were done to the cinema, with the last remnants of the picture garden being demolished in 1988. The cinema survived the introduction of television by becoming an 'art house' venue. The Windsor was the first cinema to screen subtitled films in Perth.

Sometime during the 1970s, a fire struck the cinema. The cinema was restored, but closed on 24 September 1983. The venue was purchased by Roger and Chrissie Hunt & Cyril Watson. They built a second indoor cinema where the gardens used to be, and opened the second screen in November 1988. The new 'twin' cinema has a capacity to seat 210 people and the old auditorium has seating arrangements for 500 people. In 1997, the old auditorium, Cinema 1, air-conditioning was upgraded from the single compressor unit of the 1960s. Cinema 2 had air-conditioning installed when built.

In November 2005 the Windsor Cinema became part of the Luna Palace group, following a leasing agreement between the owners and Luna Palace management. In July/August 2012 Luna Palace installed NEC Digital Cinema systems in both Cinema 1 and 2 bio-boxes.

== Architectural character ==
The Windsor Cinema is an example of Inter-War Functionalist architectural design. The functionalist characteristics of the cinema include the use of decorative elements that serve no particular function, horizontal and straight lines (often three in parallel), roofs concealed behind parapets, steel and reinforced concrete used to achieve wide spans and the asymmetrical massing of simple geometric shapes. A Nautical Moderne design aspect is seen in the steel balustrading, which reflects the influence of elements associated with ocean liners.

There has been many changes to the building both externally and internally since its construction in 1937. These include the removal of the picture gardens and replacement with a second modern cinema and car parking, removal of the original candy bar, ticket box and booking office, modernisation of the toilets, demolition of old street canopy, new foyer ceiling, modifications to the projection room and bio-box balcony and the installation of new seating throughout the auditorium.

== Heritage value ==
The Windsor Cinema was classified by the National Trust (WA) on 3 December 1990. The building is also included on the City of Nedlands' Municipal Heritage Inventory although it is not listed on the State Register of Heritage Places, having been determined by the Heritage Council of Western Australia in 1995 as not meeting the threshold criteria.
