= Beaches in estuaries and bays =

Type of beaches

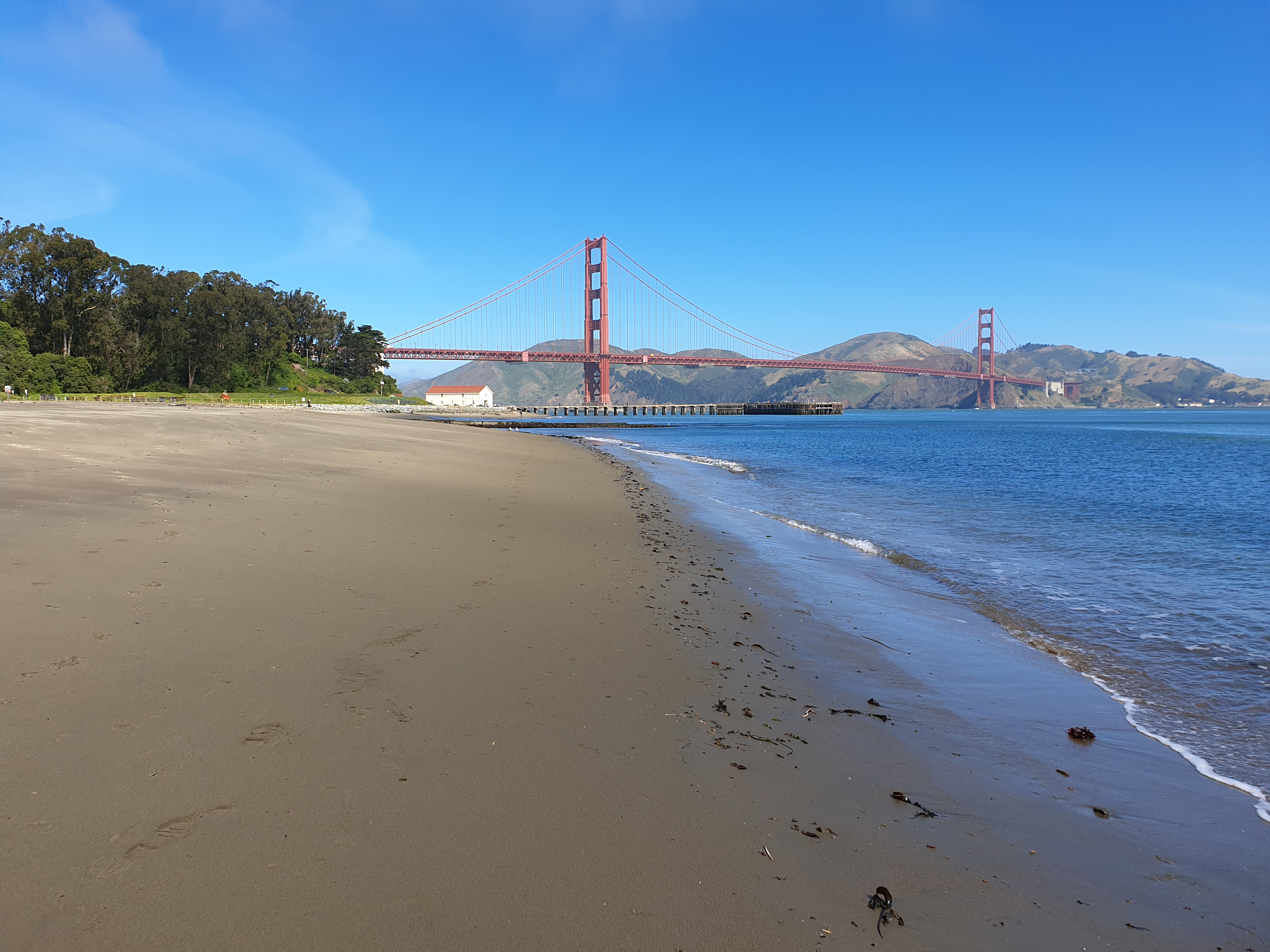
A BEB adjacent to Crissy Field, San Francisco, facing the Golden Gate Bridge and Marin Headlands.

Beaches in estuaries and bays (BEBs) refer to beaches that exist inside estuaries or bays and therefore are partially or fully sheltered from ocean wind waves, which are a typical source of energy to build beaches. Beaches located inside harbours and lagoons are also considered BEBs. BEBs can be unvegetated or partially unvegetated and can be made of sand, gravel or shells. As a consequence of the sheltering, the importance of other sources of wave energy, including locally generated wind waves and infragravity waves, may be more important for BEBs than for those beaches on the open coast. Boat wakes, currents driven by tides, and river inflow can also be important for BEBs. When BEBs receive insufficient wave energy, they can become inactive, and stabilised by vegetation; this may occur through both natural processes and human action. BEBs exist in all latitudes from beaches located in fjords and drowned river valleys (rias) in high latitudes to beaches located in the equatorial zone like, for example, the Amazon estuarine beaches.

== Importance ==
BEBs are found all around the world, including in large cities such as San Francisco, Sydney, Lisbon, London and Shanghai for example. While sometimes relatively small by area, they can provide a large range of resources. In addition to their ecological importance, BEBs can provide spaces in urban-settings for people to connect with nature, and protection for landward areas and infrastructure.

=== Ecological importance ===
BEBs provide critical habitats and feeding areas for local fish and birds. Even small patches of sand can provide critical habitat. Many BEBs are fronted by sea grass and may allow marshes to develop behind them. BEBs in estuaries are the habitat for Horseshoe crabs, which during spawning, if combined with moderate wave heights, modify the beach profile such as it becomes concave, similar to a storm profile and lowering the wave-energy threshold for morphological response. Studies in Jamaica Bay showed that the ecological restoration of Horseshoe crabs was limited by the extent of the beach instead of the water quality. Studies of the Ichthyofauna of low energy BEBs in Southern Brazil showed their dependence on salinity and energy.

=== Social importance ===
BEBs are often small and isolated and not as iconic as open-ocean beaches in popular culture; and may have a history of litter, pollution and dereliction. However, BEBs are often located around major cities and provide an important recreational and cultural resource. BEBs provide calm swimming opportunities for young children. They can be immensely popular, like the beaches in the Pará River (Amazon Coast of Brazil) or in Sydney Harbour, or little-known, as are some in San Francisco Bay.

=== Coastal protection ===
BEBs provide protective buffers for wetlands and coastal development and it is important to protect them. The seagrass that often fronts these systems in Australia is endangered and ecological restoration projects such as Operation Posidonia are in place to restore this seagrass. Other coastal protections placed in estuaries, like oyster reefs, are believed to attenuate erosive waves and therefore protect the adjacent BEBs, however, living reefs can create undesired coastal changes related to interrupting sediment transport pathways and excessive wave attenuation.

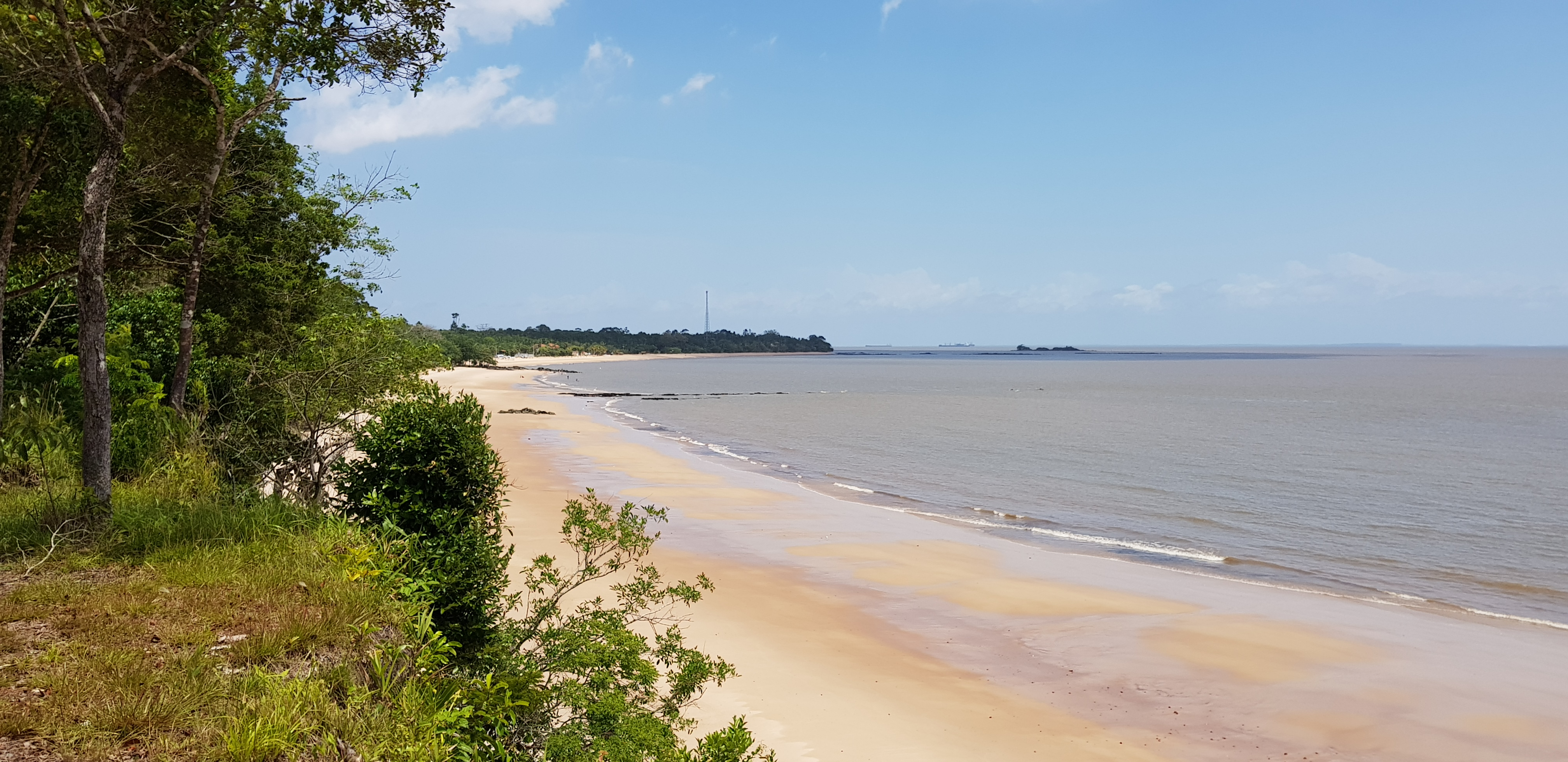
Marahu beach in the Para Estuary, Amazonian coast of Brazil.

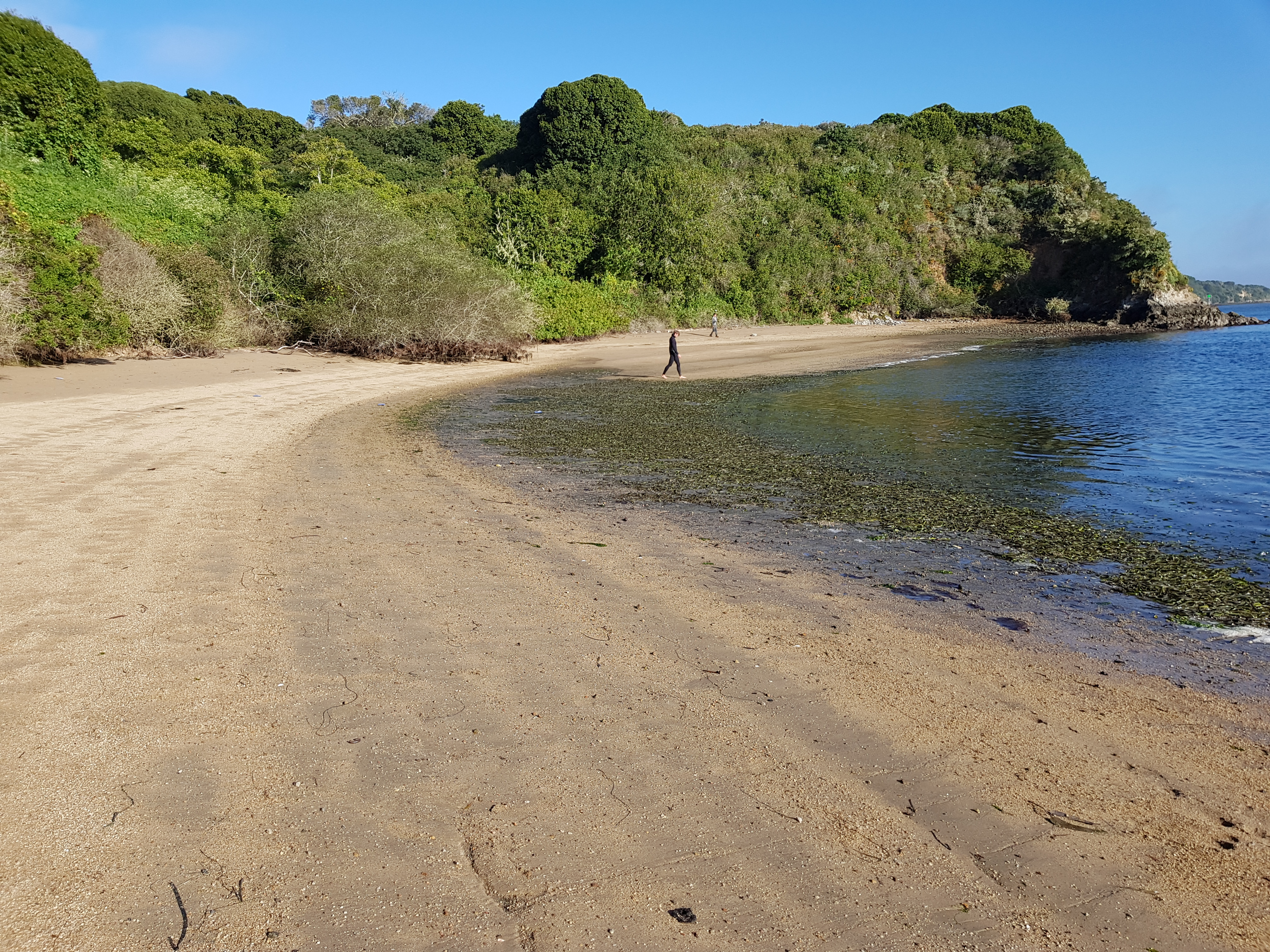
Mixed mud/sand beach in the interior of Tomales Bay, California.

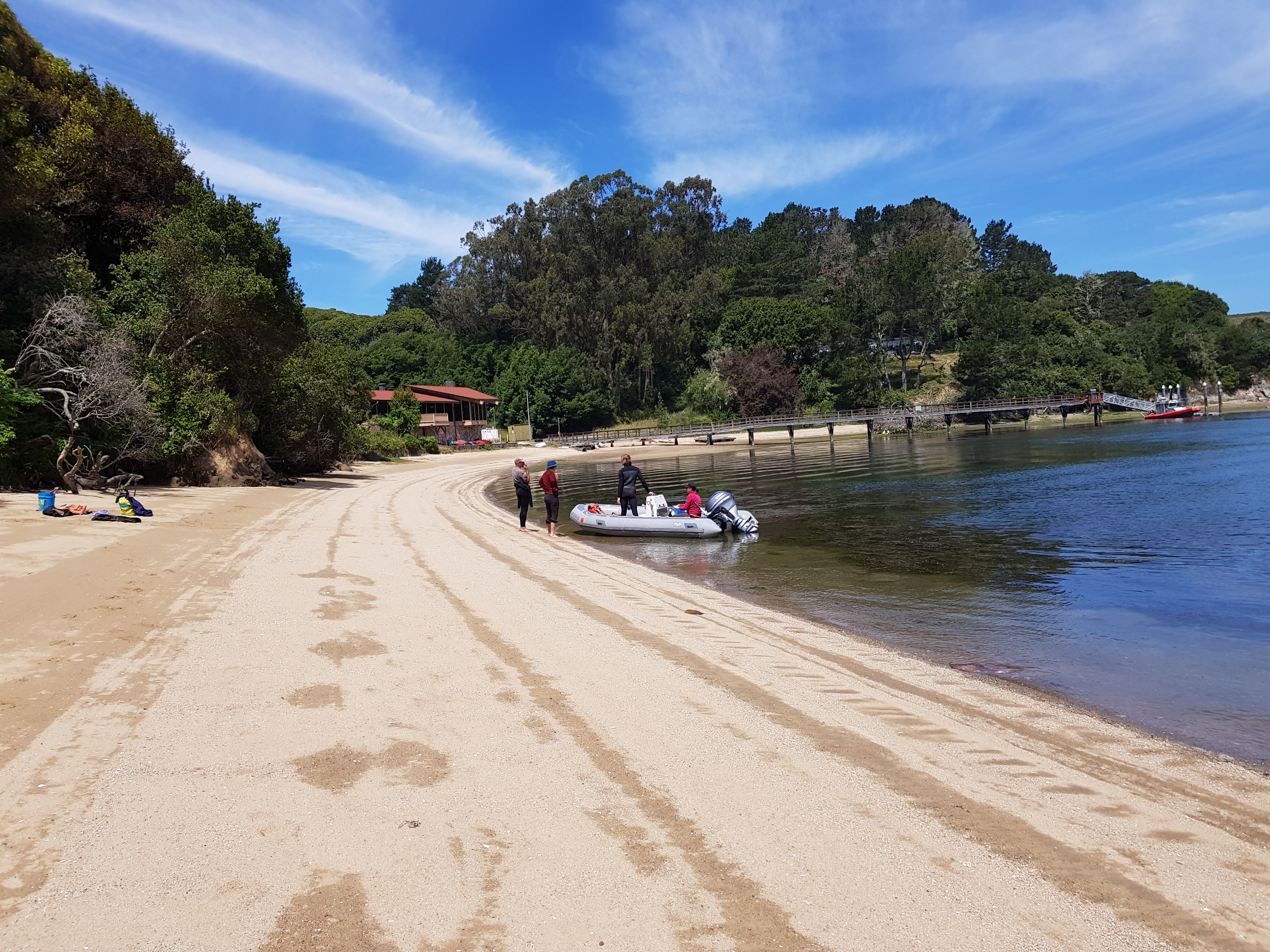
Visitors land on a sandy embayed beach at Sacramento Landing in Tomales Bay, California.

== Characteristics ==
BEBs, like all beaches, are accumulations of unconsolidated sediment (i.e., sand) within the cross-shore limits of wave action and occur where there is a suitable supply of sediment and exposure to waves that are energetic enough to move sediment and overcome stabilization by vegetation. The underlying geology is a primary control for the shape, volume and stability of BEBs, and the location and orientation of the beach inside the estuary or bay are important controls on its morphodynamic equilibrium. The hydrodynamic processes (i.e., waves and currents) that control the shape and equilibrium of BEBs are largely determined by the geometric configuration of the estuary/bay; this includes the width and orientation of the entrance and the width, length and depth of the estuary/bay. For example, tidal currents are strong at constrictions like at the mouth of bar-built estuaries; estuaries or bays with wide mouths allow propagation of ocean waves; and, the existence of a large enough wind fetch within an estuary or bay allows the development of locally generated wind waves. However, BEBs primarily exist in fetch-limited conditions, causing the geologic and biologic factors on beach shape to have outsize importance.

Typical gradients from the entrance to the inner estuary or bay are observed:

- Decreased influence of ocean waves.
- Increased influence of riverine currents.
- Increased proportions of fine sediments (mud and silt).
- Increased influence of aquatic vegetation (seagrass, mangroves, salt marsh).

Other social factors like population and nearby infrastructure control the degree to which a beach is affected by boat wakes and engineering works that can change the geometry of the bay. In fact, most bays and estuaries hosting large cities are strongly modified, for example, San Francisco, Shanghai, Sydney, or London.

BEBs can be controlled by different types of wave energy depending on their location inside the estuary/bay and the geometric configuration of the estuary/bay. The morphology and characteristics of BEBs vary broadly depending on geology, sediment availability and hydrodynamic energy. They can be narrow and low and exist under low-energy conditions or they can be directly exposed to swell waves propagating into the estuary, in which case they might resemble a beach on the open coast, but still be controlled by different processes. They can occur in all tidal conditions, from micro- to macro-tides, and under strong river flows to no river flow.

- BEBs can exist in large estuaries with narrow entrances, such as the case of the estuaries of the East coast of the US. In this case, locally generated wind waves represent the most important physical parameter controlling beach morphology. Given the limitations of basin size, it is typically the fetch rather than the wind duration that determines the wave characteristics (i.e., amplitude and period) and these beaches have been denominated as fetch-limited beaches in the literature. Additional wind influences on BEBs result from sea-level set-up and tilting of the water surface in the basin.
- BEBs can also exist in estuaries with wide entrances located along wave-dominated coasts such as the SE coast of Australia. Here beaches that are normally subject to low-energy conditions are sometimes exposed to large energy swell that propagates into the estuary/bay during high-energy storms. In these occasions, areas can undergo sometimes severe coastal erosion from which the beach may take many years to recover.
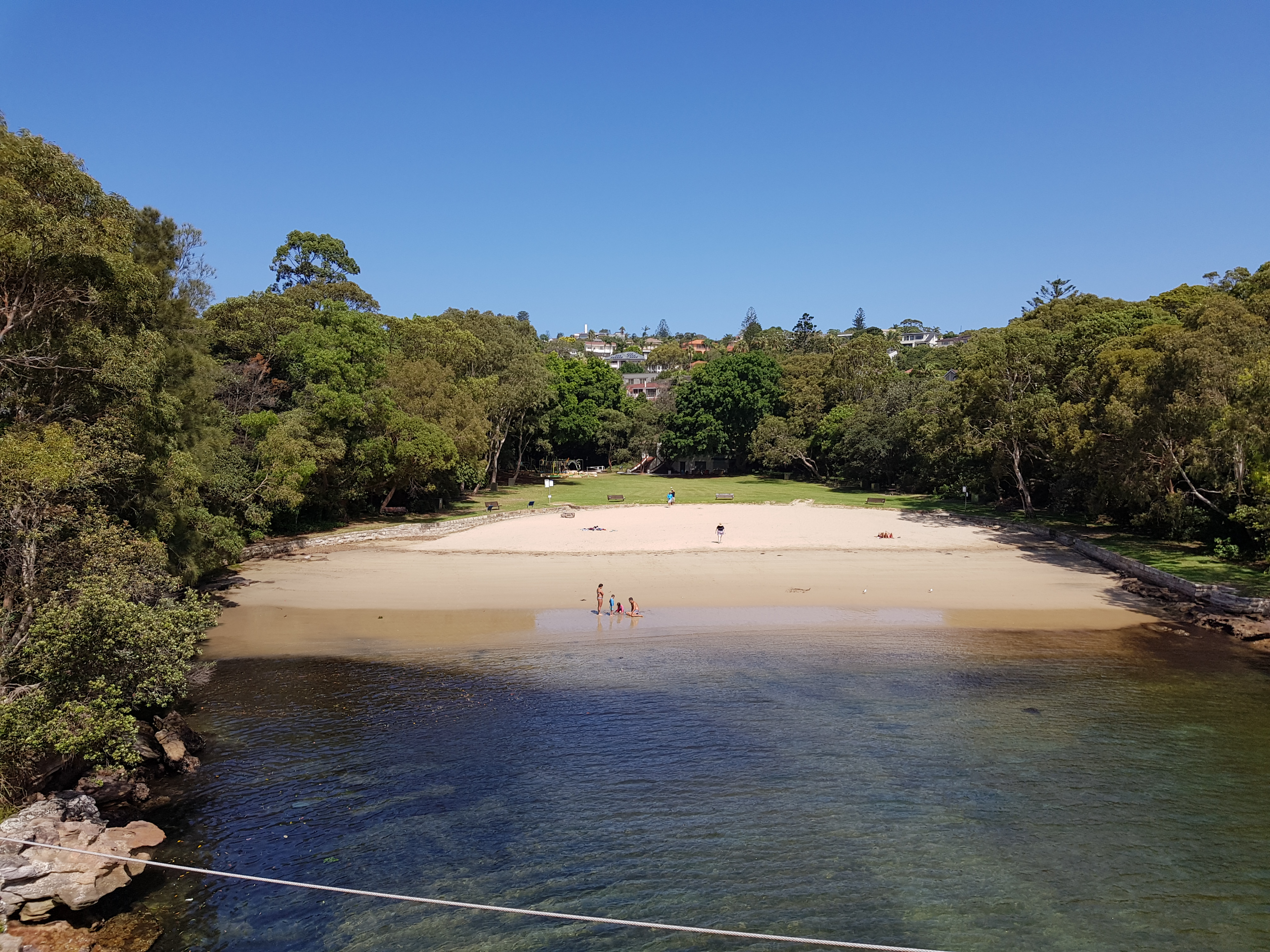
Beachgoers play at the land-water interface in Parsley Bay, Sydney Harbour, Australia.

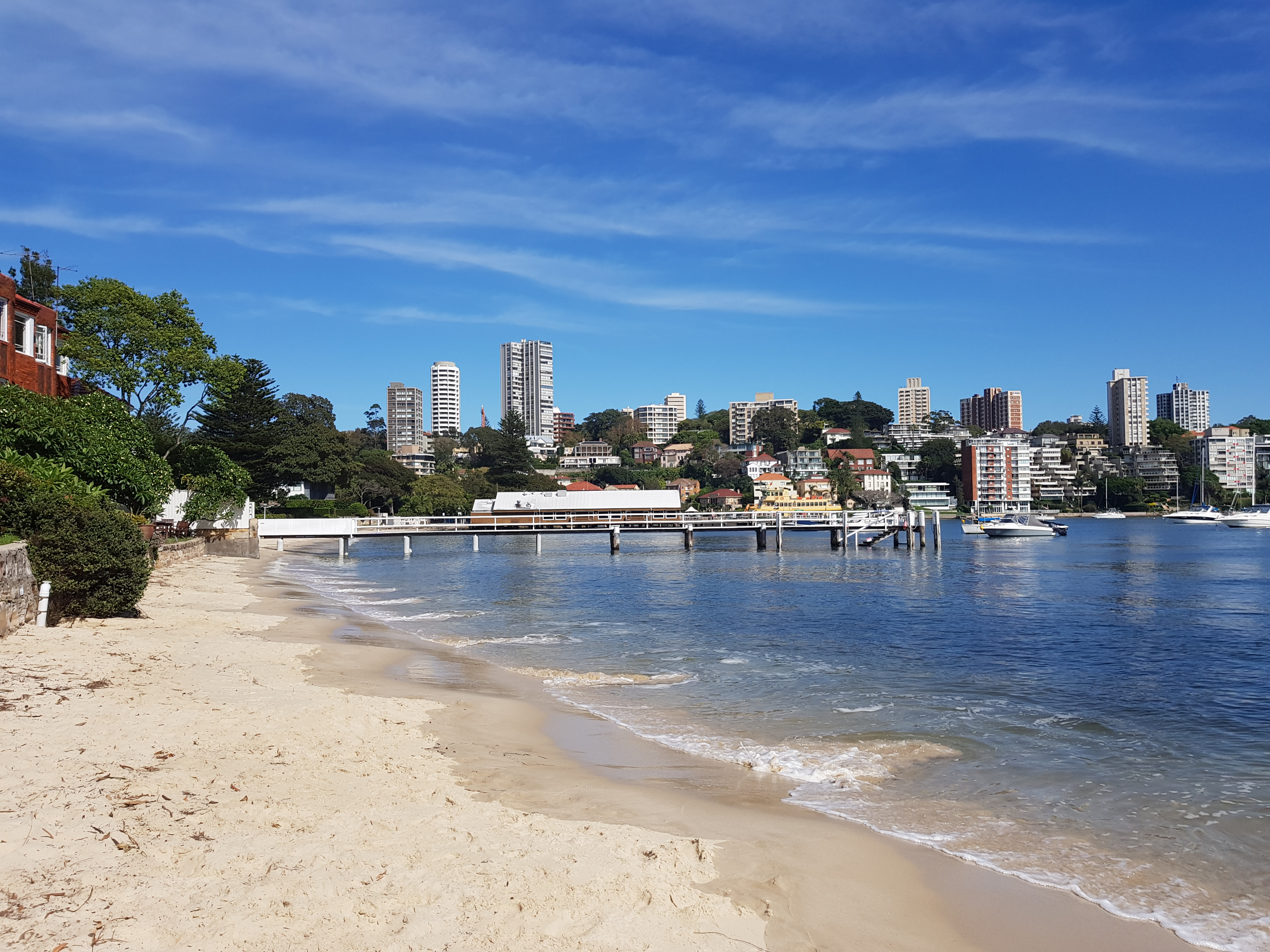
A quiet dock in Double Bay, Sydney Harbour, Australia.

== Other terms used for BEBs ==
BEBs may be low energy, sheltered, fetch-limited, lagoonal, backbarrier, and elsewhere, therefore, they have been noted in the literature with very different names. Here are a few examples:

- Low-energy beaches. This term has been used by many authors. However, many BEBs exhibit larger dimensions than those expected from low-energy beaches and they can receive more hydrodynamic energy than expected according to Jackson et al. (2002).
- Fetch-limited beaches. Fetch is the length of water over which a given wind direction blows. This term has been widely used to refer to beaches inside estuaries and bays where locally generated wind waves are the main source of hydrodynamic energy however, the term can also be applied to beaches outside estuaries and bays, with different characteristics.
- Sheltered beaches. This term applies inside estuaries and bays as BEBs are partially sheltered from ocean wave energy, but also to beaches sheltered by structures such as reefs, islands or even spits or marinas.
- Tide-dominated beaches. This term applies to low-energy high-tide beaches where there is a sharp break in slope, which are fronted with wide intertidal sand and/or mud flats due to the dominance of tidal range over wave height. This term is independent of whether the beaches are located inside an estuary or bay or on the open coast.

== Erosion & recovery ==
When BEBs are exposed to waves larger than the dominant conditions, they undergo erosion. The volume of erosion can be smaller than the volumes eroded from open-coast beaches, but they might represent a large percentage of the total volume of the beach. The destination of the sand eroded from the beach is not clear, in some cases the sand can be lost to tidal channels or stored in the flood-tide delta. In any case, recovery is slow and the sediment transport pathways and mechanisms of recovery are mostly unknown. It has been reported that the recovery of BEBs is slower than the recovery of open-coast beaches.
