= Piccadilly Theatre and Arcade =

Shopping arcade and former theatre in Perth, Western Australia

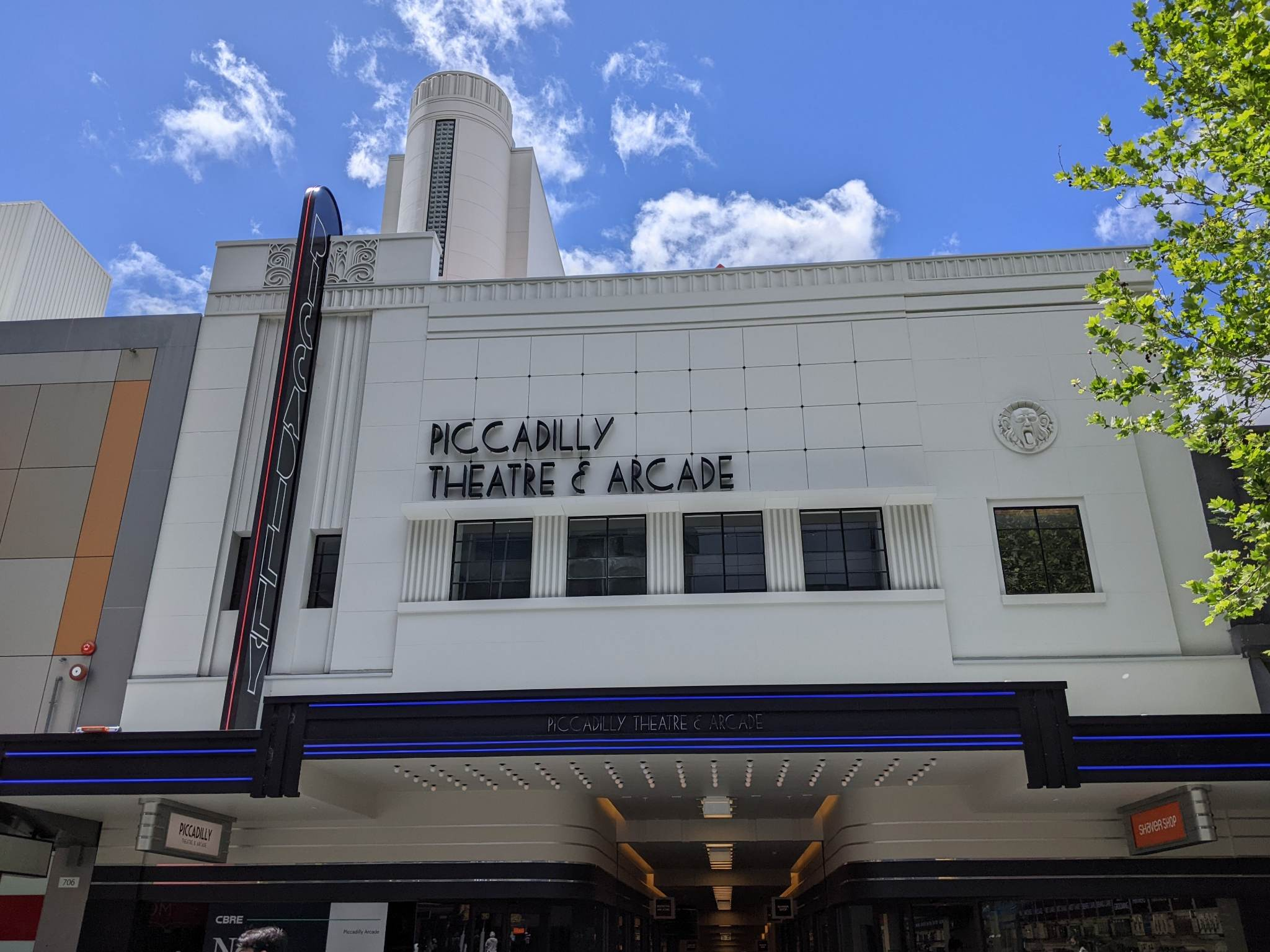
- Hay Street Mall entrance to Piccadilly Arcade, Perth

General information
- Status: Arcade open Cinema closed (October 2013)
- Architectural style: Art Deco
- Location: Hay Street, Perth, Western Australia, Australia
- Coordinates: 31.9536°S 115.8582°E
- Completed: Arcade – February 1938; Theatre –10 March 1938
- Cost: A£75,000
- Client: Claude Albo de Bernales

Design and construction
- Architects: Baxter Cox and Leighton
- Structural engineer: General Construction Company

Western Australia Heritage Register
- Type: State Registered Place
- Designated: 20 December 2002
- Reference no.: 2065

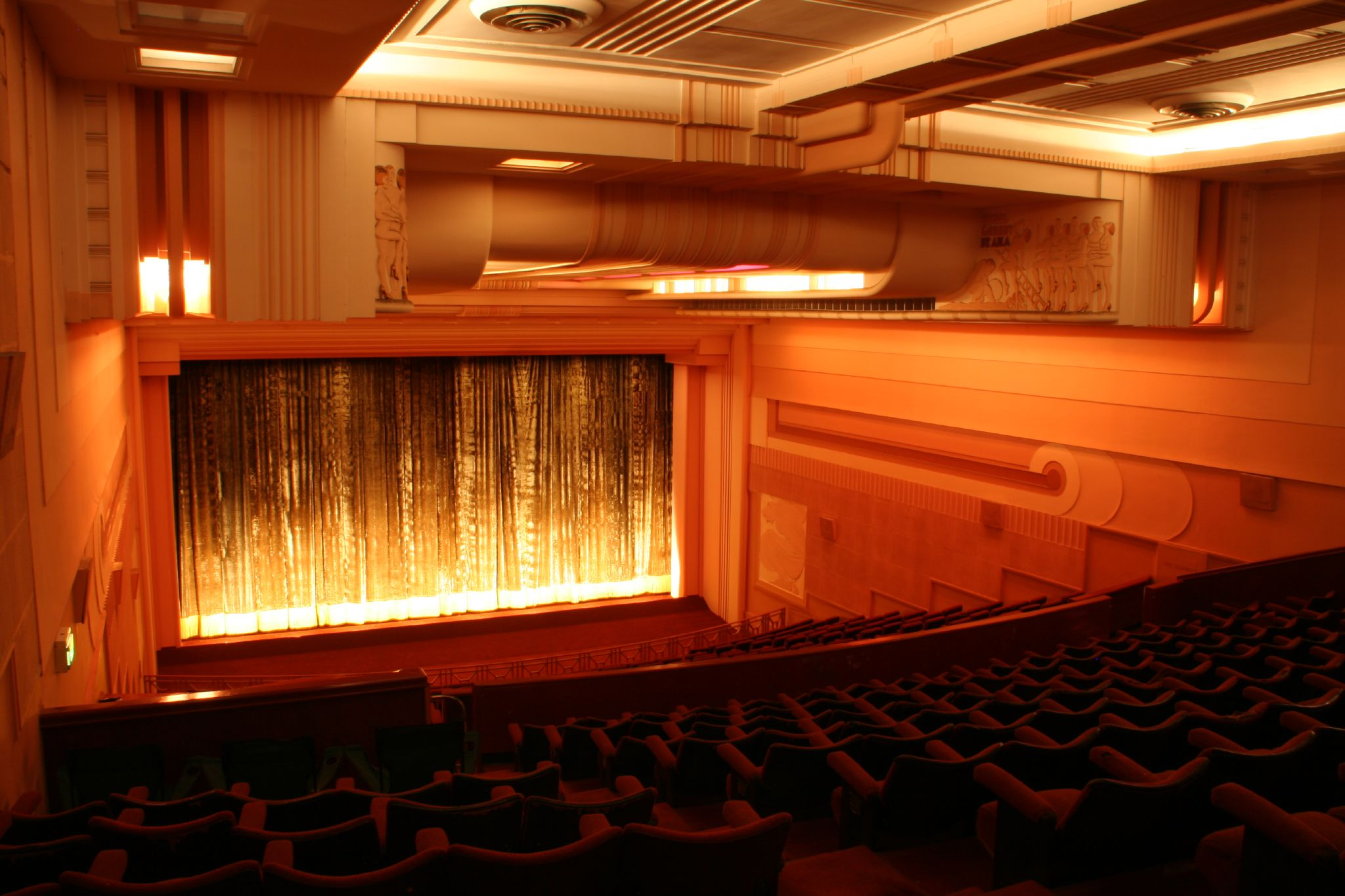
Art Deco interior of Piccadilly Cinema

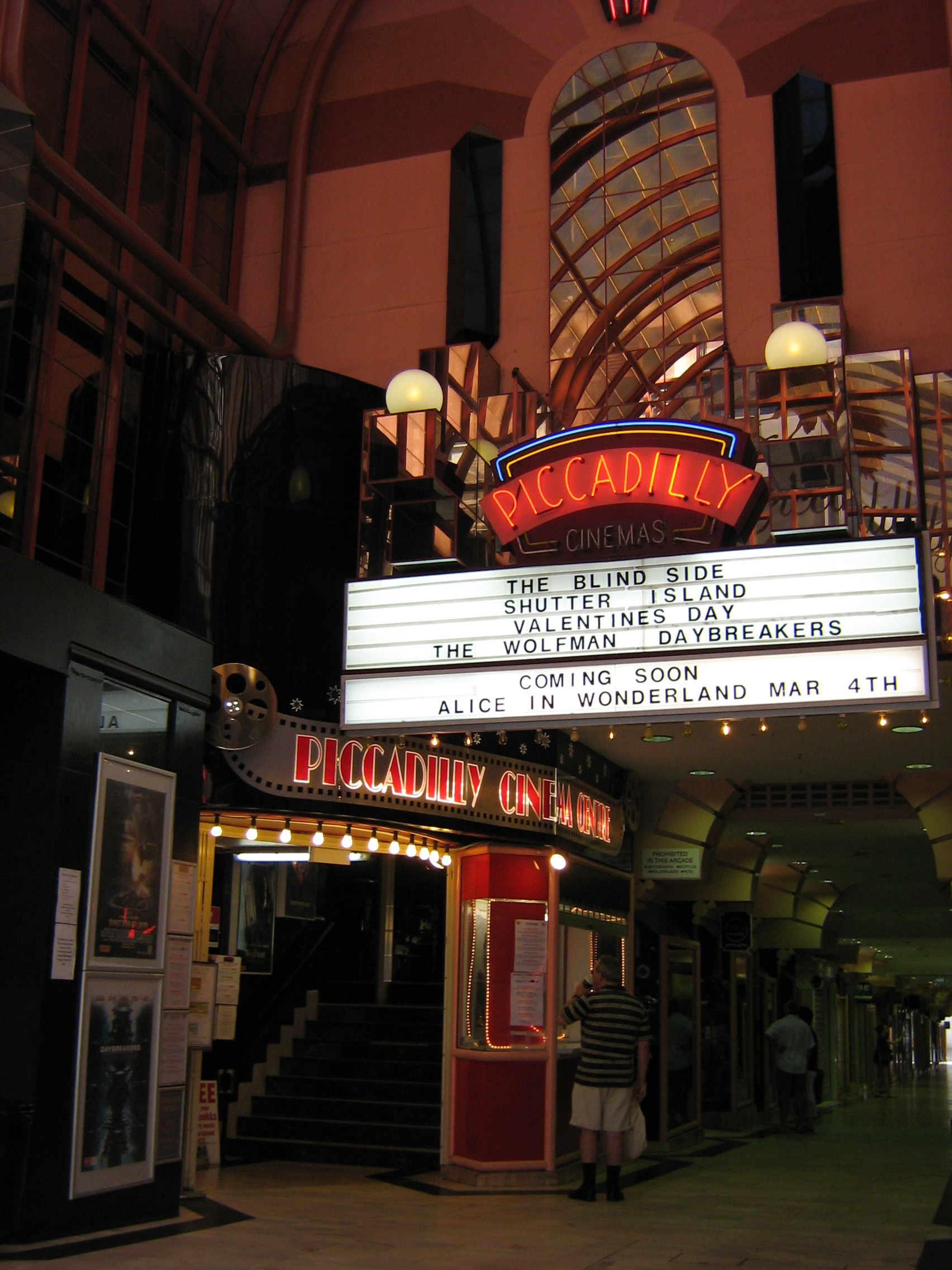
Piccadilly Cinema Ticket Box

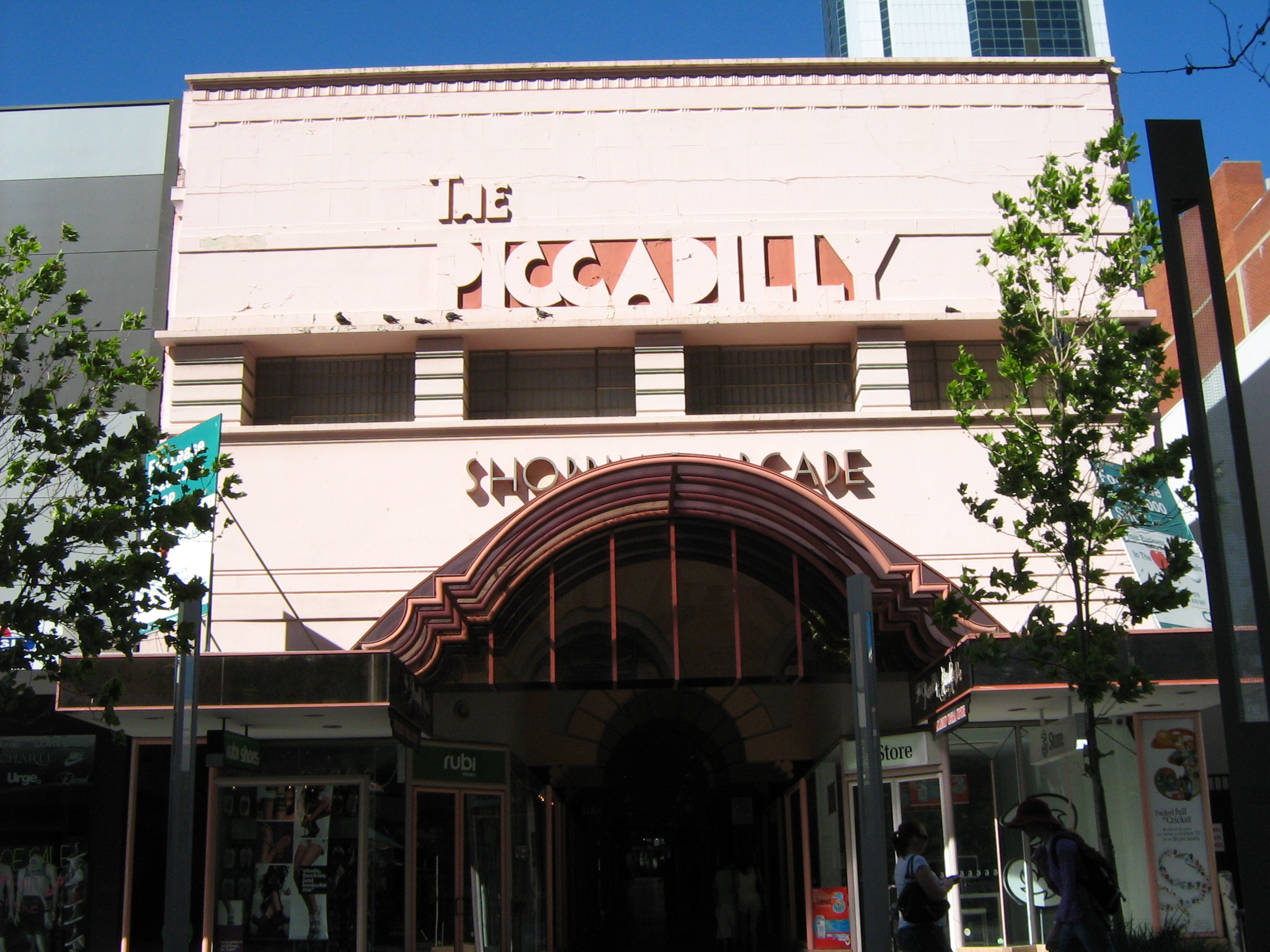
Murray Street Mall entrance to Piccadilly Arcade before the renovation

The Piccadilly Cinema Centre (formerly Piccadilly Theatre) and Piccadilly Arcade are located at 700-704 Hay Street, Perth, Western Australia. It is an art deco style cinema and shopping arcade, designed by architect William T. Leighton for mining entrepreneur Claude de Bernales. The theatre and arcade opened in 1938, with the arcade connecting Hay Street through to Murray Street.

In 1984 the theatre and arcade underwent a significant refurbishment, with the refurbishment winning an architectural award from the Royal Australian Institute of Architecture (WA Chapter) in 1986. The theatre and arcade are classified by the National Trust of Australia and are included on the State Heritage Register. The Piccadilly Cinema was the last operating cinema in the Perth central business district before its closure in 2013 and until the opening of Raine Square's Palace Cinema in 2018. Following a three-year refurbishment and renovation, the arcade was reopened in November 2021.

== History ==
The Piccadilly Theatre is one of a number of theatres and cinemas constructed in Perth and its suburbs during the Inter-war period. Originally constructed in the Inter-war Functionalist style, the Piccadilly represented the desire for enjoyment and entertainment displayed by Western Australians towards the end of the Depression. At the time of its construction, the place was fitted out with the most modern features and was the first cinema in Western Australia to be air conditioned.

The site was acquired by Claude Albo de Bernales's Australian Machinery and Investment Company Ltd in 1935. Bernales, after completing the construction of London Court in July 1937, turned his attention to his property between Hay and Murray Streets. He set up Piccadilly Arcade Pty Ltd and engaged architects Alfred Baxter Cox and Leighton to design a theatre and shopping arcade for the site. The construction of Piccadilly Theatre and Arcade utilised part of the existing buildings on the site, with the construction contract going to a local firm, General Construction Company. Piccadilly Arcade opened in February 1938, with the theatre opening a month later, on 10 March 1938. When it opened, the theatre had a seating capacity of 1,100.

The theatre and arcade feature a number of bas relief friezes of dancing girls and 'Atlas type' figures which were moulded by Perth sculptor Edward Kohler. Kohler was the second professionally trained sculptor to practise successfully in Western Australia.

Piccadilly Theatre and Arcade remained under the ownership of Piccadilly Arcade Pty Ltd until 1978, when it changed hands a few times. In 1983, the owners Australian Fixed Trust (Permanent Trustee Nominees, Canberra) made a decision to restore Piccadilly Theatre and Arcade, and it was closed for refurbishment. Perth architect, Ian Tucker, was responsible for the work. The theatre and arcade reopened in March 1984. The A$2 million refurbishment won the Royal Australian Institute of Architects (WA Chapter) 'Architecture Design Award for Renovated Buildings' in 1986. Following the refurbishment, Piccadilly Theatre and Arcade was purchased for a reported $9.9 million by Alister Norwood, founder of Jeans West.

In 1989 the cinema was sold by Hoyts to Glen Darlington, of Classic Cinemas, and closed briefly in early 1990. Malcolm Leech then took over the lease, and converted a section of the disused stalls into a small cinema, making the Piccadilly into a twin screen, seating 443 and 165 respectively. Leech subsequently converted the cinema into a triplex by adding a third cinema, with 103 seats, behind the main screen. In May 2001 Leech leased it to Dennis McKenna.

In 1992, Piccadilly Theatre and Arcade was purchased by current owners Winston Holdings Pty Ltd, Su-Rama Holdings Pty Ltd and Ayoman Pty Ltd, as tenants in common.

In March 2005 the operation of the cinema was taken over by Cyril Watson, with the previous tenant, McKenna, leaving the cinema in 2004 with large unpaid debts.

On 23 March 2010, a thunder storm with conditions not seen in almost fifty years damaged the cinema, forcing its temporary closure. The cinema re-opened after repair works were completed on 1 April 2010.

In May 2013, it was revealed that a portion of the cinema's roof had collapsed due to poor maintenance.

In September 2013, the current leaseholder of the cinema, Cyril Watson, announced that the cinema would close at the end of the September school holidays. It is reportedly $400,000 in debt for unpaid rent. The cinema space re-opened briefly in 2014 as the Noodle Palace venue as part of the Fringe World Festival. The last film screened to a paying audience was part of the Fringe World show, When God Met Satan, and was directed by Levon J Polinelli. It has also been used as a retail space and kickboxing studio.

In October 2018, a multi-million dollar redevelopment of the cinema and arcade was confirmed. The cinema was to be converted to a live performance theatre with a lounge and bar, and the arcade new lighting, flooring and shopfronts. Tenders for a builder closed in October 2018 and work was expected to begin in January 2018. The City of Perth approved a $665,575 heritage adaptive reuse grant to be provided over five years for the redevelopment. The redevelopment was completed in November 2021.

== Heritage value ==
The Piccadilly Theatre and Arcade was interim listed on the Register of the National Estate on 5 December 1988 and classified by the National Trust of Australia (WA) on 5 December 1988. The building(s) were also included on the City of Perth's Municipal Inventory on 13 March 2001 and were permanently listed on the State Register of Heritage Places on 20 December 2002 by the Heritage Council of Western Australia.

== Haunting ==
The complex is reportedly haunted by the ghost of a former manager.
