= La Porchetta =

Italian restaurant franchise in Australia and New Zealand

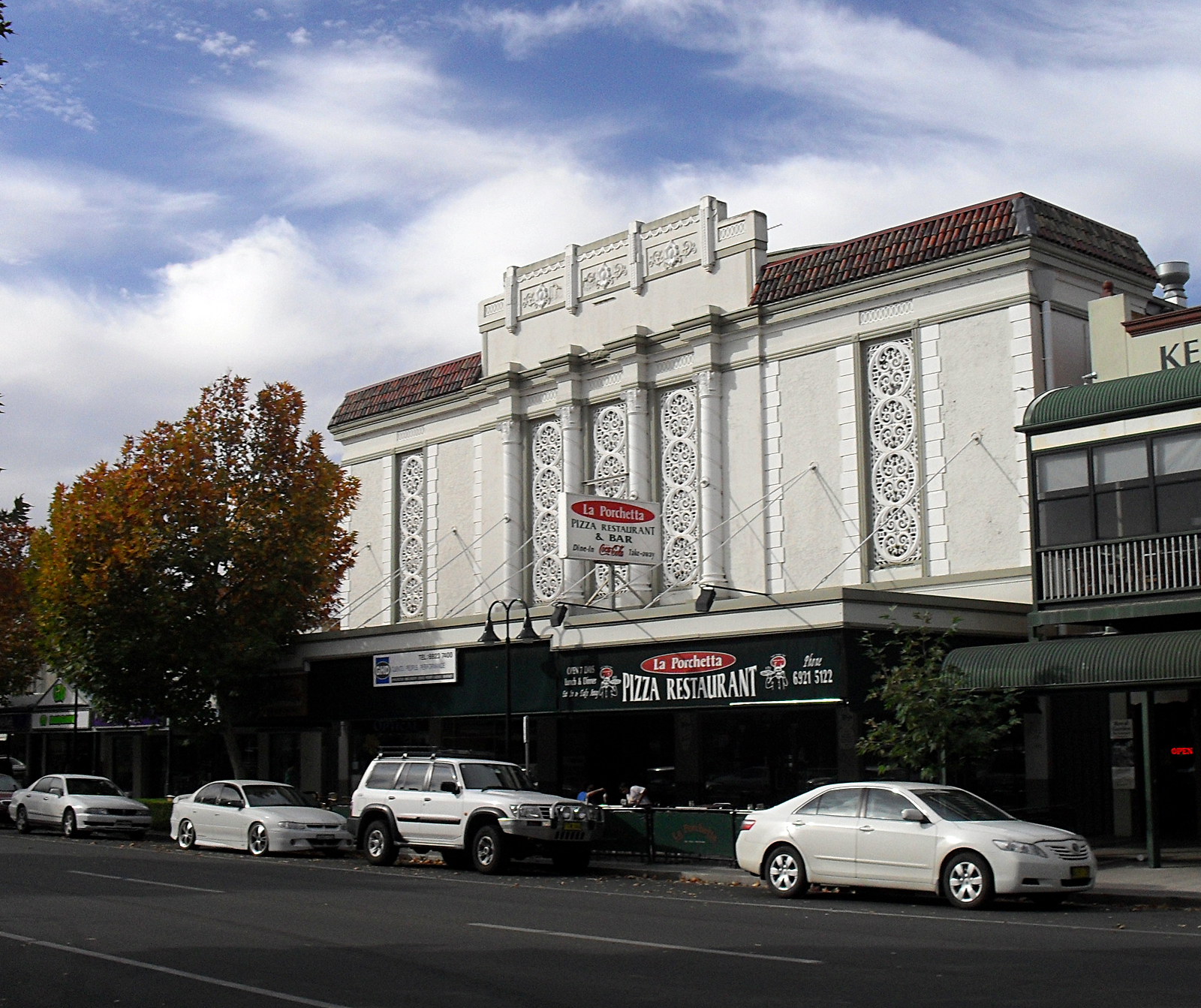
- Location in Twin Plaza of Wagga Wagga, New South Wales
- Type: Franchise
- Industry: Restaurant
- Founded: 14 November 1985; 40 years ago (Carlton, Victoria)
- Founders: Rocco Pantaleo, Felice Nania
- Area served: Australia and New Zealand
- Products: Italian food
- Website: laporchetta.com.au

La Porchetta (Italian pronunciation: [la porˈketta]) is an Italian restaurant franchise in Australia and New Zealand. As of 2026, there are about 33 stores in Australia and New Zealand which are owned by franchisees.

== Founding and history ==
La Porchetta was established in 1985 by Rocco Pantaleo and Felice Nania, when they bought a run-down pizza parlour called La Porchetta in Rathdowne Street, Carlton. Their first franchise restaurant opened in the Melbourne suburb of Reservoir, Victoria in 1990. Since 1990, over 80 La Porchettas have opened across Australia, by 2017 around 40 outlets existed. As of 2026, only roughly 33 stores remain across Australia and New Zealand.

In August 2014, Retail Food Group, which owns franchise chains Crust Pizza, Gloria Jean's coffeehouses, Donut King, Michel's Patisserie and Brumby's Bakeries, announced it would purchase La Porchetta's franchising system for $16.3 million. Three months later, RFG pulled out of the deal.

The original La Porchetta restaurant in Rathdowne Street, Carlton, closed on 11 February 2024. In a social media post, members of the Pantaleo family said the family would be "moving on" and was "ready to move on to new ventures for the future".

"La Porchetta" directly translates to "The Porchetta". Porchetta usually refers to the Italian roast pork dish of the same name, although the word literally means "small pig" or "little pork" in Italian.

The business uses a mascot of a stereotypical Italian man, named 'Rocky' after La Porchetta's founder; the name can be seen on the mascot's collar.

== See also ==
- List of restaurants in Australia
- List of restaurants in New Zealand
