= Undercover Boss Australia =

- Genre: Reality television
- Created by: Stephen Lambert
- Directed by: Grant Hoy
- Narrated by: Andrew Carlton
- Country of origin: Australia
- Original language: English
- No. of series: 2
- No. of episodes: 14 (list of episodes)

Production
- Executive producers: Dafydd Williams; Nick Colquhoun
- Running time: 45 minutes
- Production companies: Studio Lambert; Southern Star Group

Original release
- Network: Network Ten
- Release: 18 October 2010 – 31 October 2011

Related
- Undercover Boss (franchise)

Undercover Boss Australia is a localised version and third incarnation of the Undercover Boss franchise, the first series premiered on Network Ten on 18 October 2010 with the CEO of Domino's Pizza Australia, Don Meij. Each episode depicts a high-ranking executive or business owner acting as an entry-level employee to discover the problems in their company.

On 15 November 2010, Network Ten renewed the show for a second series. The second series began airing on 12 September 2011.

== Format ==
Each episode features a high-positioned executive or the owner of a corporation going undercover as an entry-level employee in their own company. The executive changes their appearance and assumes an alias and fictional back-story. The fictitious explanation for the accompanying camera crew is that the executive is being filmed as part of a documentary about entry-level workers in a particular industry. They spend approximately one week undercover, working in various areas of the company's operations, with a different job and in most cases a different location each day. The boss is exposed to a series of predicaments with amusing results. They invariably spend time getting to know the people who work in the company, learning about their professional and personal challenges.

At the end of their week undercover, the boss returns to their true identity and requests the employees they worked with individually to corporate headquarters. The boss reveals their identity and rewards hard-working employees through campaign, promotion or financial rewards. Other employees are given training or better working conditions.

== Episodes ==
The first series premiered on Network Ten on 18 October 2010 with the CEO of Domino's Pizza Australia, Don Meij. The episodes that followed included the CEO of Boost Juice, Janine Allis, and Peter Murray, National Director of Operations of Veolia Environmental Services, and CEO of BIG4 Holiday Parks of Australia, Ray Schleibs A second series was broadcast from 12 September 2011.

Series	Episodes	Originally aired	
Series	Episodes	Series premiere	Series finale
1	6	18 October 2010	22 November 2010
2	8	12 September 2011	31 October 2011

== Production ==
Network Ten planned an Australian version for airing in 2009, however the production never took off and instead, was delayed one year. Ten's Chief Programming Officer, David Mott stated "We’ve defined a few iconic Australian companies. It's a great series. It's a real eye opener. It's a little ripper.", hoping the series will become a ratings success to similar to that of Masterchef Australia. He also explained the Australian version will be based on the American version, not the British version "We saw the UK version, but thought it needed to be upscaled a little bit,"....."That's what the American version was." It should be noted this was before Network Ten's bankruptcy in 2017 (which the US version broadcaster acquired the network).

== International broadcasts ==
Selected episodes of Undercover Boss Australia air in the United States on TLC and OWN, as part of Undercover Boss: Abroad.

In the United Kingdom, the series rotates with other iterations of the franchise on the Undercover Boss Global channel of Pluto TV; as of 2023 the Australian series and Undercover Boss Canada had begun airing on E4 Extra.
