= Eagle Boys =

Australian fast food pizza chain

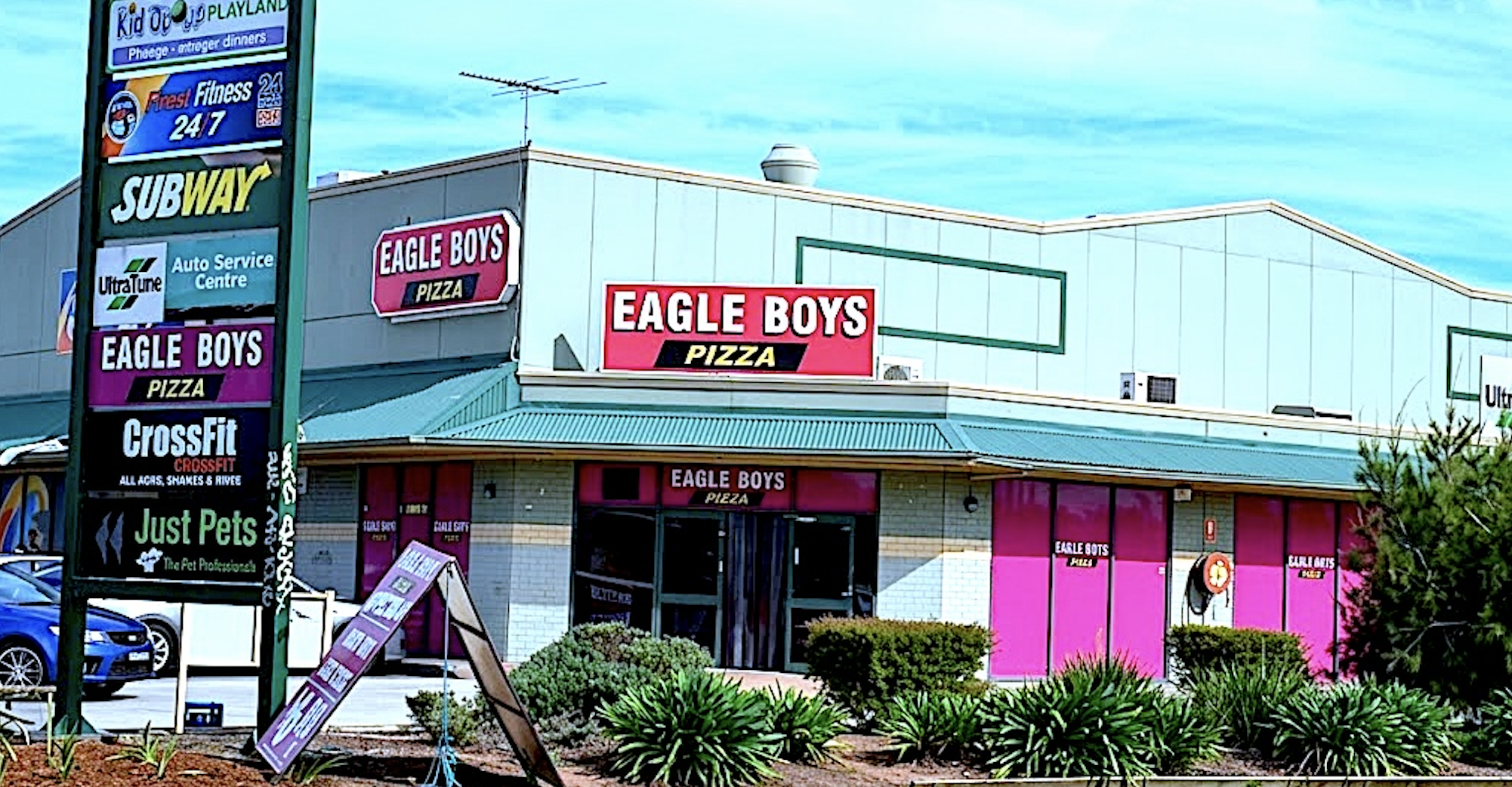
- Eagle Boys Pizza in St Marys, New South Wales, pictured in November 2008
- Type: Private
- Industry: Restaurant
- Founded: Albury, New South Wales, Australia (1987; 39 years ago)
- Defunct: 2017; 9 years ago
- Headquarters: Annerley, Queensland, Australia
- Key people: Tom Potter, founder Todd Clayton, CEO (2007–12); Bruce Scott, CEO (2012–15); Nick Vincent, CEO (2015–17)
- Products: Pizza · pasta · desserts
- Revenue: $8.27 million (in 2015)
- Number of employees: Up to 3,500 (reported in February 2015)

Eagle Boys was an Australian fast food pizza chain.

Eagle Boys was founded in Albury, New South Wales, by businessman Tom Potter in 1987. From 1992, Eagle Boys national headquarters were located in Annerley, Queensland. In 2007 NBC Capital, a Queensland-based venture capital group, bought Eagle Boys from Potter. At the chain's peak, in 2013, more than 340 Eagle Boys stores were operating across Australia. Outlet numbers fell drastically between the end of 2013 and the end of 2014 to around 170. In July 2016, fewer than 130 stores remained open and administrators were brought into the head office to identify restructuring options ahead of a potential sale of the business, although the move did not extend to franchisee-operated outlets. In November 2016, Pizza Hut announced to media that it was drafting a merge with Eagle Boys, but the merge was never finalised. As of that date, 114 Eagle Boys stores operated throughout Australia; making it the fourth largest pizza chain in the country, with less than 10% share of the country's pizza market.

== Stores ==
More than 340 Eagle Boys stores were operating across Australia at the pizza chain's peak in 2013. Outlet numbers fell drastically between the end of 2013 and the end of 2014 to around 170. At July 2014, Eagle Boys was the third largest pizza chain in Australia, with 12% share of Australia's pizza market. By the end of 2014, Eagle Boys' visitation rate dropped below that of Crust Pizza, and fewer than 130 stores remained open.

As of April 2016, Eagle Boys stores could be found in all mainland Australian states and the Northern Territory. The stores had a strong regional emphasis with most outlets located in non-metropolitan areas, including Bathurst, Bendigo and Mareeba.

== History ==
=== 1987–2007 ===
The first Eagle Boys store opened in Albury, New South Wales, in 1987. It was a venture spearheaded by businessman Tom Potter in partnership with his mother, Barbara Potter, who guaranteed a $70,000 loan to enable him to open the store. The store was initially called "Beagle Boys" after the Disney Beagle Boys, but Potter dropped the "B" after a few months in operation, worrying that the naming may have been a copyright infringement. Potter went on to build the business and become CEO of the chain.

In 1989, Potter started recruiting franchisees. Eagle Boys' national headquarters were opened in 1992 in the Brisbane suburb of Annerley.

Eagle Boys set up in New Zealand in 1996 when Stallone's Pizza owner Gavin Cook agreed to merge with Eagle Boys to provide an established base in the South Island. Rapid expansion saw the Eagle Boys chain grow to 54 national outlets in the country by early April 2000. In 2000, all New Zealand stores were sold to Restaurant Brands for NZ$28m and converted to Pizza Hut outlets.

The company developed an express system, called "Eaglexpress", from 1999 to 2002, to serve two minute "express" pizzas (limited range of four) between 5:30 and 8:00 pm, which was achieved by constantly remaking their four most popular pizzas and keeping them in a warmer for sale. Unsold pizzas were discarded after 30 minutes. From 2002, when the Eaglexpress concept was launched, to 2003, sales at the chain rose by around 40%. The chain came to see the Eaglexpress two-minute pizza service and its drive-through services as a "beachhead" to compete with its biggest fast-food competitors including Hungry Jack's and KFC.

=== 2007 to 2016: NBC Capital years ===
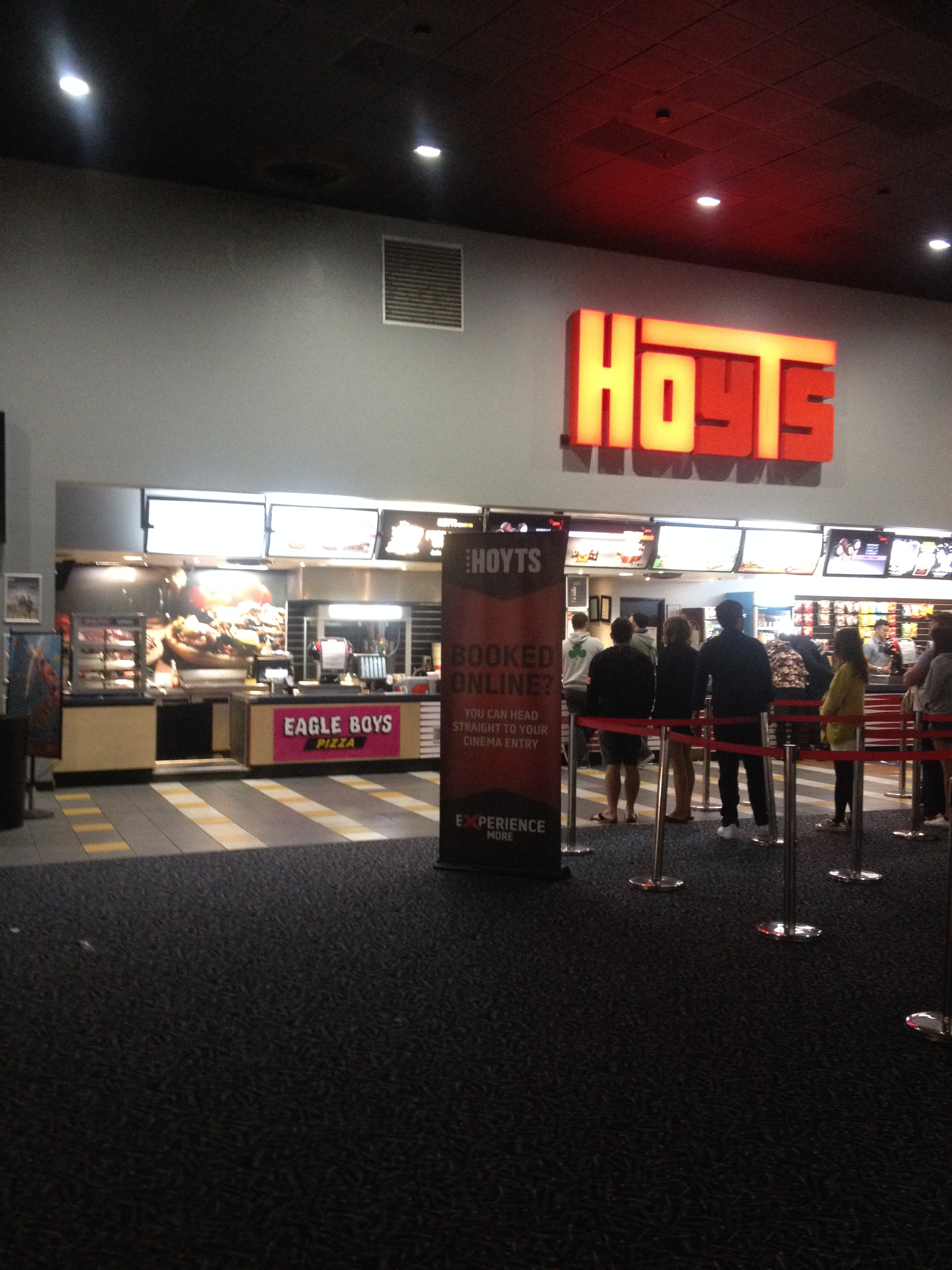
Picture of the Eagle Boys Express at Hoyts cinema Belconnen in May 2016

In March 2007, Tom Potter handed his control of Eagle Boys on to NBC Capital, a Queensland-based venture capital group. He retained some shares in the company, and worked in a consultancy role advising the chain on operations for 12 months. By 2008, Potter retained less than 10% of the vote for corporate decision making and was no longer involved in operations.

In late 2007, Eagle Boys began trialing an online ordering system and announced plans to enable customers to order online from all of its stores by February 2008. By the end of 2008, the system was fully implemented.

In July 2008, Eagle Boys entered into a deal to acquire the Pizza Haven chain across Australia. The deal saw Eagle Boys move into Sydney and South Australia for the first time. Between July 2008 and June 2009, Eagle Boys opened 56 stores—the fastest growth the chain had experienced in its history.

In February 2010, Eagle Boys was named in BRW magazine's "Fast Franchise" list for the first time. By March 2011, Eagle Boys had more than 25 stores in Sydney. It had also overtaken Pizza Hut to become the second largest pizza maker in Australia. However, Pizza Hut regained second position by July 2014.

CEO Todd Clayton departed Eagle Boys in 2012. He had been in the role since NBC Capital acquired a majority stake in 2007. At the time, the founder of NBC, Bruce Scott, stepped in as CEO.

In July 2013, Eagle Boys commenced operations in Papua New Guinea. Worldwide, stores numbered over 330 by September 2013.

On 3 October 2014 The Sydney Morning Herald reported that former franchisees asserted that the current franchisor, NBC Capital, had stopped print and media advertising since purchasing the business. The number of stores was reported to have halved from 340 locations. Franchise owners told media they were concerned at changes to the advertising mix, including the reduction of offline advertising activities. Revenue in 2014 fell to $17.4 million, down from $25.2 million in 2012 and $21.1 million in 2013.

To capitalise on the benefits of cloud computing, Eagle Boys shifted its ordering system to Microsoft Azure in 2015. Through providing improved website performance and uptime and providing more sophisticated performance metrics, the new hosting system should support more online orders, which the Eagle Boys IT chief says are worth 1.5 times the orders which are made in-store or by telephone.

In May 2015, Eagle Boys announced it was aiming to expand with a plan for 50 outlets in India by the end of 2015. The same month a franchisee opened an Eagle Boys store in Suva, Fiji.

Eagle Boys appointed Nick Vincent as the new CEO in October 2015, replacing Bruce Scott. Vincent had previously been the company's general manager of retail, since April 2014.

=== 2016: Sale to Pizza Hut ===
On 15 July 2016, Eagle Boys Pizza appointed administrators to identify restructuring options ahead of a potential sale of the business. The administrators, SV Partners, owned by a former director of NBC Capital, Bernie Stapleton, took control of the day-to-day running of the business, and searched for potential buyers of the business. Eagle Boys announced that trade would continue as normal at franchisee-operated outlets during the administration, and franchisees were told their fees were due as normal.

Fairfax Media outlets tipped Domino's and Retail Food Group (the owner of Pizza Capers and Crust) as possible buyers. However, Retail Food Group confirmed it was not in discussions with the owners or administrators of the Eagle Boys franchise system in a statement on 19 July 2016. As of November 2016, 114 stores operated throughout Australia, making it the fourth largest pizza chain in the country with less than 10% share of the country's pizza market.

In November 2016, Pizza Hut told media that it had merged with Eagle Boys. In a statement, Pizza Hut said that it intended to convert about half of the Eagle Boys stores to the Pizza Hut brand before Christmas 2016; the remainder it hoped to convert by April 2017. The first store to switch from Eagle Boys to Pizza Hut was on Sydney's northern beaches.

== Marketing ==
In 1992, Eagle Boys registered its "pink glow"—the pink look of its logo— with IP Australia, the Australian Government intellectual property office. A customer survey in support of the company's application found people strongly associated the pink glow with Eagle Boys stores. The distinctive colour scheme was designed to create a fun and upbeat feel.

In 2007, Eagle Boys launched the "Vote 1 Full Size Large Pizza" campaign bringing to task its competitors for selling smaller pizzas. Domino's had reduced the size of their large pizzas in mid-2007 and Pizza Hut had changed their sizing in late 2006. The campaign produced a sales uplift of over 27%.

In 2009, the pizza chain announced a $7 million advertising campaign, called the "Real" campaign, that reinforced its "Bigger, Better" slogan. The campaign involved the VW "Real Mobile" driving around Australia offering Eagle Boys pizza and recording testimonials for a TV commercial. Later in the year, Eagle Boys launched another campaign comparing its pizzas to those of its competitors, this time built around the "blind taste test" which found almost half of test subjects preferred Eagle Boys pizzas to those of pizzas from Domino's and Pizza Hut combined.

In 2010, Eagle Boys launched a multimillion-dollar campaign "31 New Menu Items – Each One Delicious”. The campaign was the first to use Eagle Boys' new phone name 1300 EAGLE BOYS. New pastas were among the 31 new menu offerings, Desserts were also included, among them a chocolate fudge mousse that received a Gold Medal at the 2010 Royal Queensland Food and Wine Show. The menu was tested over a 12-month period ahead of the launch. Eagle Boys told media it expected a 15% spike in sales on the back of the launch. A gluten "friendly" base was also on the menu for the first time, with an Eagle Boys spokesperson claiming it was more transparent than claiming it could offer a gluten-free base—only food prepared in a gluten-free kitchen can make the claim that it is truly offering a gluten free range. The chain also announced it would scale back its social media spend.

In 2011, the chain released advertising "Our large pizzas are bigger than theirs" in another attempt to demonstrate their large pizza offered effectively an extra slice of pizza to their closest rival, Domino's. Domino's chief executive, in response, told media that "value is not in the size of a pizza." Eagle Boys recorded a 20% jump in sales in the first week of the campaign compared to the previous week. The pizza chain also announced it would be supporting the Cerebral Palsy Alliance, with a plan to donate more than $200,000 over three years to the charity, starting with $1 from every dessert sold during Cerebral Palsy week in August 2011. In July 2011, Eagle Boys received Halal accreditation for its Bexley store.

Rebranding in 2013 as part of the "making pizza happy" campaign involved introducing a new logo along with new pizza boxes and uniforms. The iconic eagle was dropped from the logo at time, with management citing pressure from its client base to drop to eagle. The company introduced a "happy bell" to ring when customers were having a good time—aiming for a happier feeling for the in-store experience. The campaign was rolled out in stages, beginning in Far North Queensland, a decision an Eagle Boys spokesperson said was designed to pay homage to the chain's regional heritage.

By 2014, around one-third of the pizza chain's marketing budget was directed to digital spend. That year, the chain released a campaign leveraging off the release of Australian film Fat Pizza vs. Housos. It also announced a partnership with streaming company Quickflix, offering customers an exclusive deal on a one DVD and streaming bundle package. In 2014 the chain also donated more than 600 kg of potatoes to food rescue charity OzHarvest.

2015 saw Eagle Boys launch the first "store of the future" in Bundaberg. The concept store, with a design including exposed brickwork and recycled timber, was developed based on research carried out on customer preferences and behaviours.

In March 2016, Eagle Boys launched a trial of "Virtual Drivethru" at several of their stores in the Townsville area. The technology enables customers to order their pizzas online, drive to the store and alert store team members that they have arrived by pushing a button so that staff can deliver their order to their customers' cars.

== See also ==
- Pizza Haven (Australia)
- Domino's Pizza Enterprises
- List of pizzerias in Australia
- List of restaurant chains in Australia
- List of fast food restaurant chains
- Pizza Capers
