= List of Undercover Boss Australia episodes =

Undercover Boss Australia is the Australian incarnation of the Undercover Boss franchise. The first series features 6 episodes and premiered on Network Ten on 18 October 2010. A second series consisting of 8 episodes began airing on 12 September 2011.

== Series overview ==
Series	Episodes	Originally aired	
Series	Episodes	Series premiere	Series finale
1	6	18 October 2010	22 November 2010
2	8	12 September 2011	31 October 2011

== Episodes ==
=== Series 1: 2010 ===
No. in series	Title	"Boss"	Original release date
1	"Domino's Pizza Australia"	Don Meij	18 October 2010
Don Meij, Chief Executive Officer of Domino's Pizza Australia goes undercover and returns to where he started out in the business at various entry-level jobs.
2	"Veolia Environmental Services"	Peter Murray	25 October 2010
Veolia Environmental Services Director of Operations, Peter Murray, returns to the entry level jobs where he started his work for Veolia.
3	"Boost Juice"	Janine Allis	1 November 2010
Janine Allis, founder and CEO of Boost Juice, goes undercover and works in Boost Juice bars and a mobile van as well as the company's latest venture, Salsa's Fresh Mex Grill.
4	"Big 4 Holiday Parks"	Ray Schleibs	8 November 2010
Newly appointed CEO of Big 4 Holiday Parks, Ray Schleibs, temporarily steps down from his position to go undercover in his business.
5	"Toga Hospitality"	Rachel Argaman	15 November 2010
Rachel Argaman goes undercover in hotels which Toga provides staffing for.
6	"Ritchies IGA"	Fred Harrison	22 November 2010
Fred Harrison goes undercover in Ritchies IGA stores across Australia. At one location he is sacked due to poor performance.

=== Series 2: 2011 ===
No. in series	Title	"Boss"	Original release date
1	"Great Southern Railway"	Tony Braxton-Smith	12 September 2011
CEO of Great Southern Railway, Tony Braxton-Smith, goes undercover where he will be unloading luggage, cleaning, making beds, cooking in the kitchens and serving guests in the restaurants.
2	"Hog's Breath Cafe"	Brett Dryland and Rodney Winkleman	19 September 2011
Brett Dyland, Hogs Breath Cafe MD, and Rodney Winkleman, Hogs Breath Cafe OD, head undercover.
3	"Ella Baché"	Pippa Hallas	26 September 2011
Ella Baché CEO, Pippa Hallas, decides to go undercover in her own firm.
4	"JBS Australia"	Iain Mars	3 October 2011
Iain, JBS Swift's rock star CEO, is giving up the high life to go undercover.
5	"Staging Connections"	Tony Chamberlain	10 October 2011
CEO Tony Chamberlain heads undercover in Stage Connections.
6	"Sodexo"	JohnPaul Dimech	17 October 2011
Sodexo CEO and father of four, Johnpaul Dimech, is inspired by staff when he goes undercover.
7	"YMCA"	Nick Cox	24 October 2011
YMCA CEO Nick Cox goes undercover and is inspired by the people he meets along the way.
8	"Hutchinson Builders"	Scott Hutchinson	31 October 2011
Hutchinson Builders CEO, Scott Hutchinson, goes undercover.

== Ratings ==
=== Series 1: 2010 ===
Episode		Viewers Metro Cities	Rank			Ref.
Episode		Viewers Metro Cities	Timeslot	Day	Week	Ref.
1	Domino's Pizza Australia / Don Meij	1,314,000	1	4	6	
2	Veolia Environmental Services / Peter Murray	1,134,000	1	7	21	
3	Boost Juice / Janine Allis	1,268,000	1	4	21	
4	Big 4 Holiday Parks / Ray Schleibs	1,188,000	1	7	18	
5	Toga Hospitality / Rachel Argaman	1,192,000	1	6	10	
6	Ritchies IGA / Fred Harrison	1,039,000	2	9	20	

=== Series 2: 2011 ===
Episode		Viewers Metro Cities	Rank			Ref.
Episode		Viewers Metro Cities	Timeslot	Day	Week	Ref.
1	Great Southern Railway / Tony Braxton-Smith	764,000	2	13	45	
2	Hog's Breath Cafe / Brett Dryland and Rodney Winkleman	669,000	2	14	59	
3	Ella Baché / Pippa Hallas	796,000	2	10	44	
4	JBS Australia / Iain Mars	578,000	3	19	77	
5	Staging Connections / Tony Chamberlain	795,000	3	15	52	
6	Sodexo / JohnPaul Dimech	531,000	4	22	—N/a	
7	YMCA / Nick Cox	—N/a	—N/a	—N/a	—N/a	—N/a
8	Hutchinson Builders / Scott Hutchinson	—N/a	—N/a	—N/a	—N/a	—N/a

Metro Cities - Sydney, Brisbane, Melbourne, Adelaide and Perth
