= Tierra Mia Coffee =

American cafe chain

Tierra Mia Coffee Company
- Type: Private
- Industry: Specialty coffee
- Founded: 2008
- Headquarters: Los Angeles, California, United States
- Key people: Ulysses Romero, Founder & President
- Products: Third wave coffee, Latin specialty beverages, latte art, pastries
- Website: www.tierramiacoffee.com

Tierra Mia Coffee Company is a specialty coffee retailer and roaster that operates 20 retail locations in California, United States. The company opened its first coffeehouse in March 2008 in the city of South Gate at the intersection of Firestone Boulevard and Atlantic Boulevard. In March 2010, Tierra Mia Coffee opened its second location in the city of Huntington Park, within the historic Pacific Boulevard commercial district. The Pacific Boulevard commercial district is the third highest grossing commercial district in the County of Los Angeles. In July 2010 the company opened its third location adjacent to city hall in the city of Santa Fe Springs. In March 2012 Tierra Mia Coffee opened its fourth store and first drive thru location in the city of Pico Rivera on Slauson Avenue, and in August 2012 opened its fifth store in Downtown Los Angeles at the intersection of Spring Street and 7th Street. Several stores opened after 2012 with the thirteenth location opening in La Habra in March 2018 on Whittier Boulevard. Two locations are in Northern California. The fourteenth location opened on Main Street in Santa Ana, California in December of 2018, and the fifteenth location opened on State College Boulevard in Anaheim, California in the first quarter of 2019. Additionally locations in West Covina, Pomona, El Monte, La Puente and a second store in Huntington Park now offer the Tierra Mia Coffee brand.

The company roasts all of its coffee offering and bakes all of its pastry offering sold in its stores.

Pulitzer Prize winning food critic Jonathan Gold of the LA Weekly wrote about Tierra Mia Coffee in August 2008, and described the company as a third wave of coffee concept that offered "the world's best beans". Tierra Mia Coffee has also been profiled in the Los Angeles Times, La Opinión and Al Borde, and has appeared on television newscasts of Univision and Telemundo. In September 2008, Tierra Mia Coffee held an opening event that was attended and keynoted by California State Controller John Chiang.

In December 2011, in LA Weekly's Best of LA, Tierra Mia Coffee was listed as one of the "10 Best Coffee Shops in Los Angeles".

== Fare ==
Tierra Mia Coffee makes its espresso utilizing La Marzocco and Mazzer equipment and creates beverages with latte art. All of its brewed coffee is made to order using a pour over method.

== Management ==
Tierra Mia Coffee was founded by Ulysses Romero and funded by a group of private investors. Ulysses Romero holds an MBA from Stanford University's Graduate School of Business and a bachelor's degree from Berkeley's Haas School of Business. He previously worked at Kean Coffee a concept started by coffee luminary Martin Diedrich, founder of Diedrich Coffee, one of the first coffeehouse chains in Orange County, California.
