= Grand Theatre, Perth =

Former theatre and cinema in Perth, Western Australia

Grand Theatre
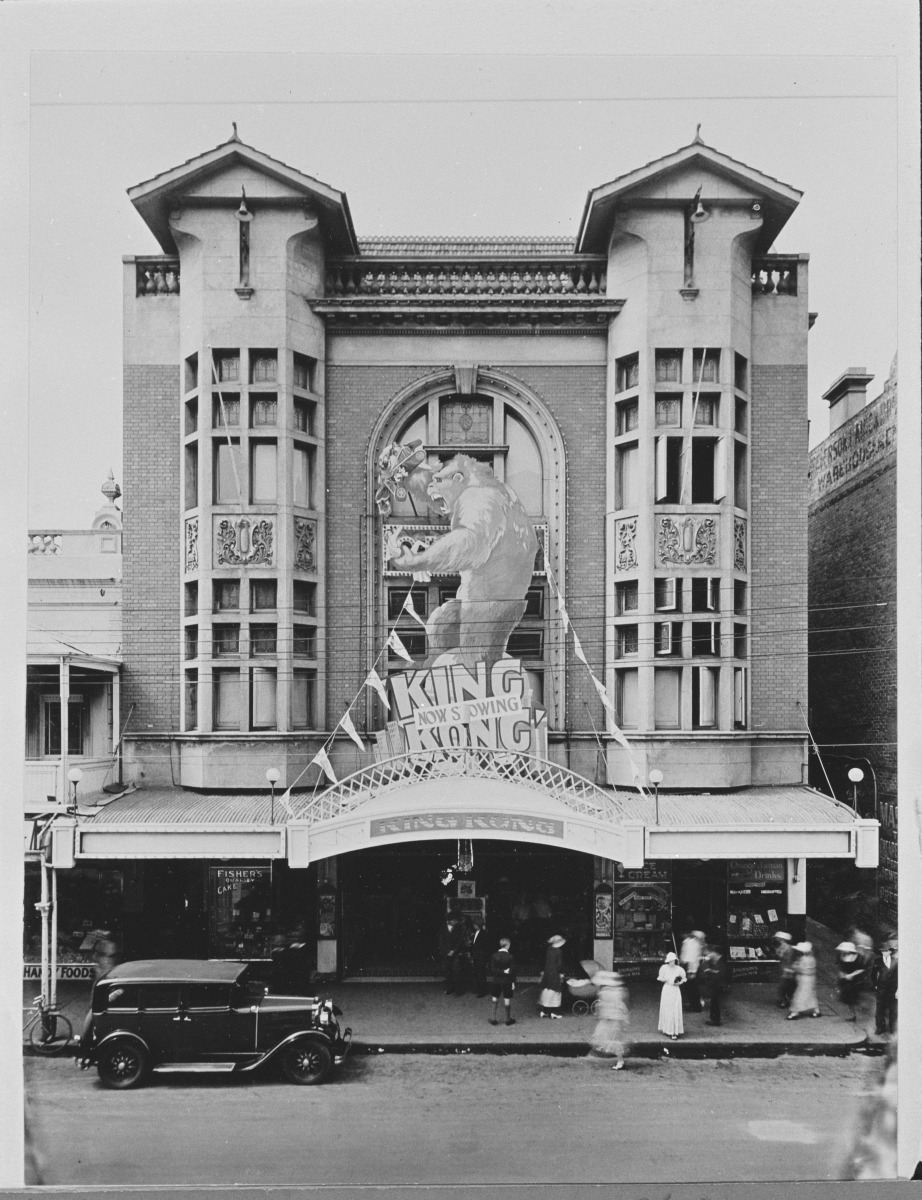
- Grand Theate decorated for the film King Kong in 1934
- Interactive map of the Grand Theatre area

General information
- Status: Demolished
- Type: Theatre
- Architectural style: Edwardian
- Location: 164–168 Murray Street, Perth, Western Australia, Australia
- Coordinates: 31.952716°S 115.860522°E
- Completed: September 1916
- Inaugurated: 20 September 1916
- Renovated: 1938; 1949
- Demolished: March 1990
- Cost: £A 20,000
- Owner: Thomas Coombe

Design and construction
- Architect: Richard Joseph Dennehy
- Main contractor: W. Brine

Renovating team
- Architect: William T. Leighton
- Renovating firm: Baxter-Cox & Leighton
- Main contractor: C. W. Arnott

Other information
- Seating capacity: 1,300

The Grand Theatre was a theatre and cinema located at 164–168 Murray Street in Perth, Western Australia. It was opened in September 1916 and closed in November 1980. The building was demolished in March 1990.

== History ==
The Grand Theatre opened on Wednesday 20 September 1916, with a seating capacity of 1,300, with 1,000 in the stalls and 300 in the dress circle. It was opened by the Mayor of Perth, Frank Rea, with a charity fund-raising gala for wounded soldiers, which included a performance by a Soldiers Orchestra and the screening of A Yellow Streak, featuring Lionel Barrymore. The Edwardian styled theatre was built for entrepreneur Thomas Coombe, and designed by architect Richard Joseph Dennehy for a cost of £A 20,000, equivalent to A$2.3 million in 2022. The main entrance fronted onto Murray Street, and led to a 15.2-metre-wide (50 ft) marble tiled and mirror-lined vestibule with a large marble staircase. The 33.6-by-15.2-metre (110 by 50 ft) theatre auditorium was unique in Western Australia, in that it had a windlass-operated sliding roof, and also removable shutters on the side walls to allow for cross-ventilation. It had a 7.3-by-5.5-metre (24 by 18 ft) screen. It also had a secondary entrance facing Barrack Street.

While initially independent, it became a part of the Union Theatres chain. In September 1929, the theatre abandoned its orchestra and was wired for sound, with the screening of its first "talkie", The Midnight Taxi, occurring on 2 September 1929. On 29 April 1932 it became an all-British house, showcasing the most prestigious British films.

During the Great Depression, the Grand Theatre was under financial threat and in 1931 was sold for £A 82,000, equivalent to A$8.5 million in 2022, to Town and Suburban Properties Ltd, who leased it back to Union Theatres. In August 1932 the company was unable to maintain their rental payments and the bailiffs were brought in, with the theatre being taken over by the property owners. On 25 August 1932, Town and Suburban Properties Ltd formed a new company, the Grand Theatre Company, to operate the theatre rather than risk leasing it to another tenant. The company, run by James Stiles (1888–1944), gradually expanded, leasing the Regent Theatre (renamed the Metro), purchasing the Princess Theatre (Fremantle) and building the Piccadilly Theatre. The Grand Theatre, the oldest in the company's group of theatres, was relegated to being a "churn house" (a theatre that played continuous sessions).

A number of minor changes to the façade of the building were made over the course of time, including painting of the brickwork, the installation of a new neon sign running the length of the façade, and the replacement of the original ornate metal verandah with a more up-to-date style. The inside of the theatre however underwent significant changes. The theatre's first major reconstruction occurred in 1938 under the supervision of local architectural firm Baxter-Cox & Leighton, headed by architect William T. Leighton, at a cost of £A 6,000. The renovations occurred over a four-week period; the dress circle was demolished and remodelled with the aisles between the seats widened, the supporting pillars in the stalls were removed, all the internal arches and cornices were bricked up, a new plaster proscenium installed, the upstairs landings enlarged to form a smoking lounge, new ticket boxes and glass doors added and a new internal new colour scheme in pastel shades introduced. The theatre also reportedly became the first in Australia to be illuminated entirely by neon lights. The second major renovation occurred in 1949, with an extensive internal refurbishment and refurnishing. The Grand Theatre Company evolved into City Theatres Pty Ltd, and in 1973 City Theatres was acquired by a local television and entertainment consortium comprising Michael Edgley International Ltd, Swan Television and TVW Ltd. In August 1978 TVW Ltd purchased the company outright from the other members of the consortium.

The theatre closed on 6 November 1980, following the opening of the nearby Cinema City complex by TVW Ltd. The building was subsequently converted into a family restaurant, Pizza Showtime, and in 1984 into an Asian food hall before it was demolished in March 1990.
