= List of pizzerias in Australia =

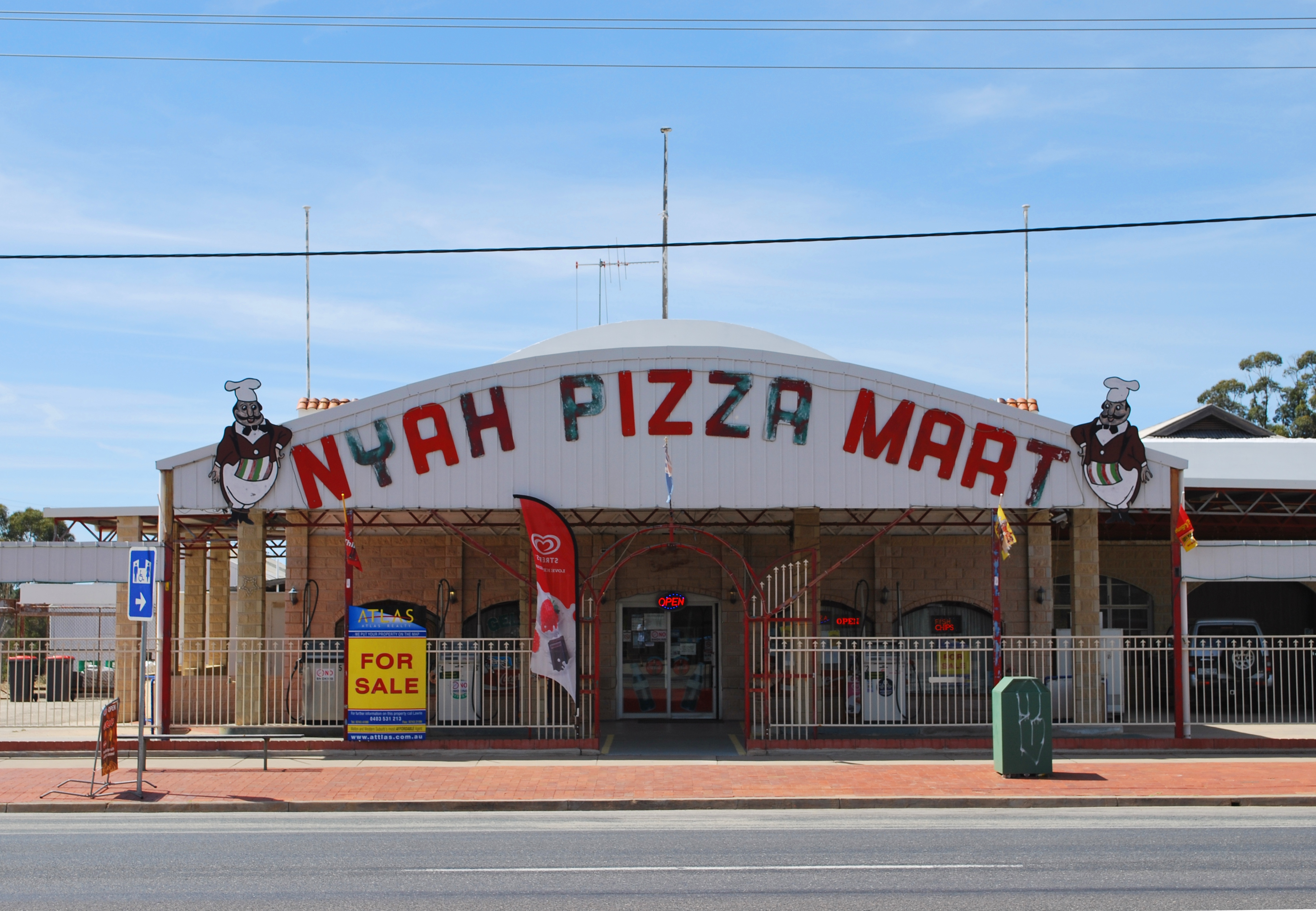
A pizza restaurant in Nyah, Victoria, Australia

This is a list of notable pizzerias in Australia.

== Chain restaurants ==
=== Current ===
- Domino's Pizza Enterprises – an Australian company that holds the master franchise for the Domino's Pizza brand in Australia, New Zealand, France, Belgium, Netherlands, Monaco and Japan, with 735 stores in Australia as of February 2026.
- Pizza Hut – An international US brand operating in Australia.
- La Porchetta – A pizza chain originating in Melbourne and also operating in New Zealand.
- Crust – A pizza chain originating in Sydney focusing on high-end, gourmet ingredients.

=== Former ===
- Eagle Boys – An Australian fast food chain specialising in pizza with 210 stores throughout Australia, particularly in regional areas. Was acquired by Pizza Hut, with some stores closing and others rebranded as Pizza Hut restaurants.
- Pizza Haven – Australian and New Zealand restaurant chain and franchise operation specialising in pizza. Later bought by Eagle Boys, which was then purchased by Pizza Hut.
- Pizza Showtime – A family restaurant and entertainment center operating in Perth, Western Australia from 1980 to around 1984.
- Little Caesars – An American chain, that launched locally in 2014 and had 14 restaurants across New South Wales when it went into administration in October 2019. All locations closed as of December 2019.
- Pizza Capers – An Australian fast food chain specializing in pizza, based in Queensland that had over 118 stores throughout Australia. As of July 2026, Pizza Capers ceased operations with a post on their website thanking it's customers for their loyalty.

== Independent pizzerias ==
- Lucia's Pizza & Spaghetti Bar – Australia's first pizzeria, established in Adelaide, South Australia
- Beppi's Restaurant – First pizzeria established in Sydney, New South Wales
- Toto's Pizza House – First pizzeria established in Melbourne, Victoria
- Totti's – A pizzeria established in Bondi, New South Wales, Australia

== See also ==
- List of fast food restaurant chains in Australia
- List of pizza chains
- List of restaurant chains in Australia
