= Donut King =

Australian restaurant franchise

- Logo used since 2024

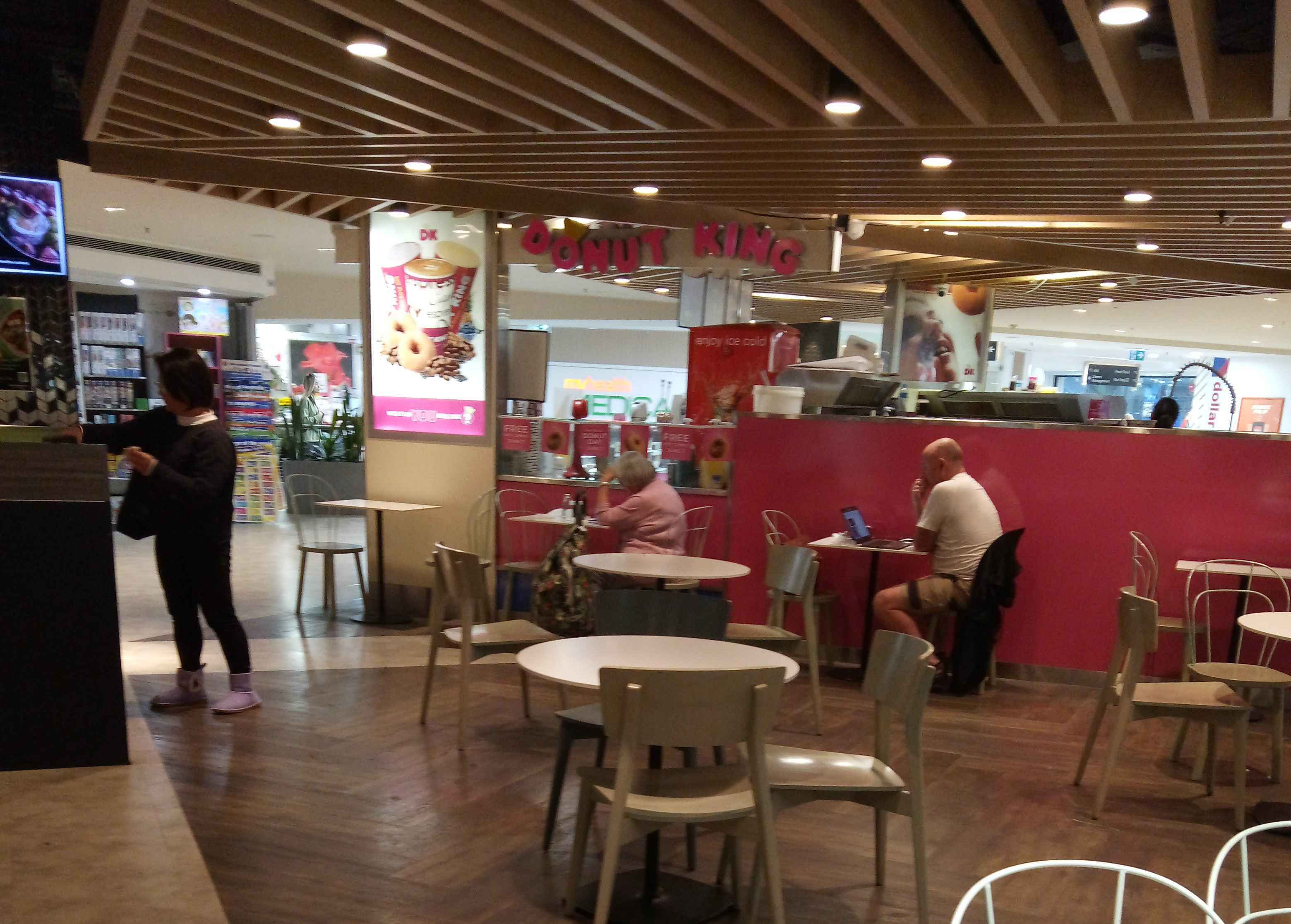
- Type: Subsidiary and franchise system
- Industry: Restaurant Franchising
- Founded: 1981; 45 years ago in Sydney, Australia
- Headquarters: Gold Coast, Queensland, Australia
- Number of locations: 360 +
- Area served: Australia, China, Fiji, New Zealand, Saudi Arabia, United Kingdom
- Products: doughnuts; coffee; soft drinks; ice creams; milkshakes; thickshakes; frozen carbonated beverages; hot dogs
- Owner: Retail Food Group
- Website: www.donutking.com.au

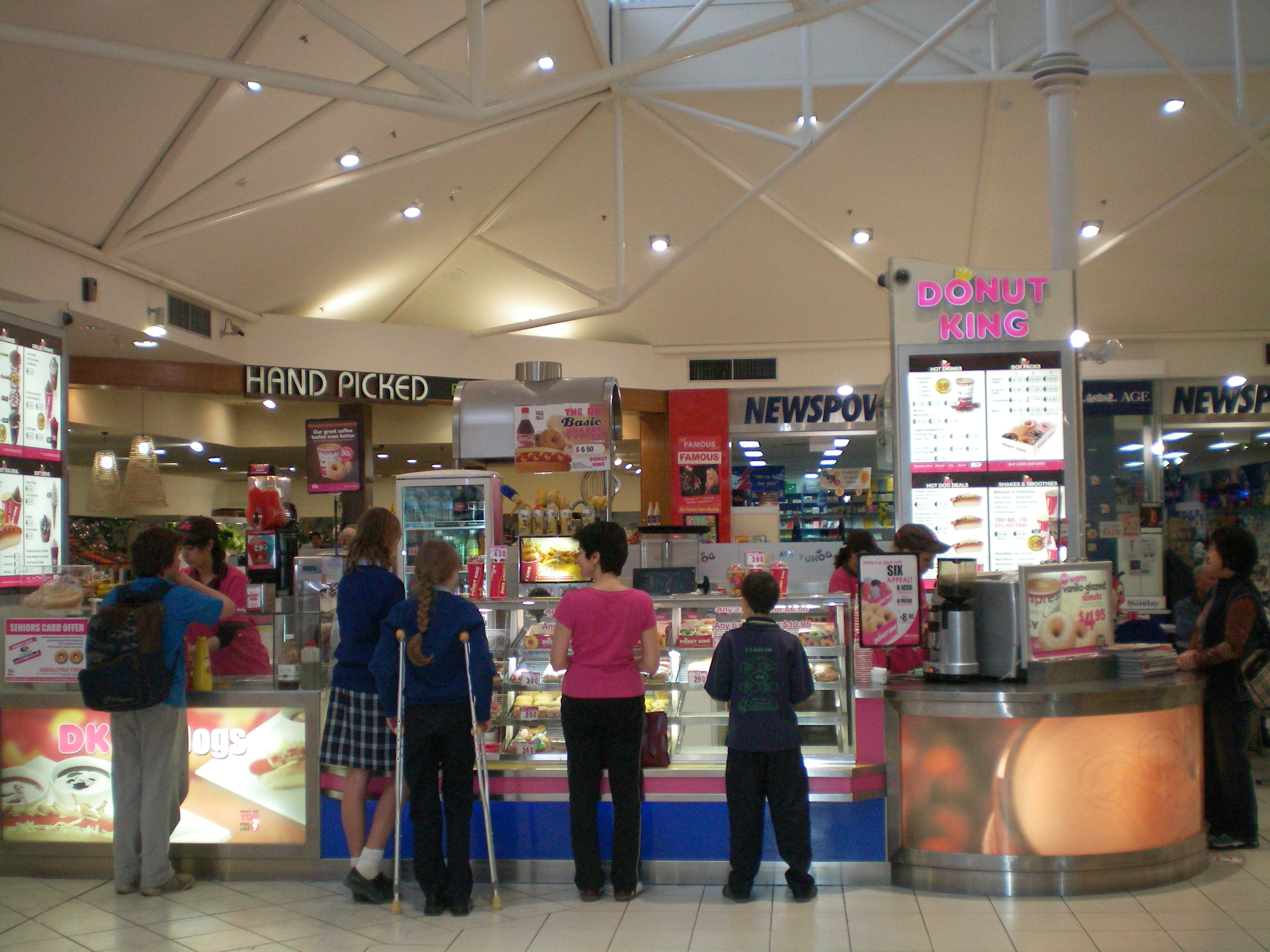
Donut King store in a shopping centre in Doncaster East, Victoria

Donut King is an Australian multinational doughnut company and quick service restaurant. It specialises in Australian-style doughnuts and coffee. Signature menu items include hot cinnamon donuts, quakeshakes, thickshakes, milkshakes and barista-made DK Coffee Blend.

== History ==
The Donut King chain was founded in 1981 in Sydney. The Donut King Brand System was established in Australia in 1989 and has been operating as a franchise system since 1991. It is currently managed, under licence, by the Gold Coast-based Retail Food Group Limited. Retail Food Group also manages Gloria Jeans Coffee, Michel's Patisserie, Brumby's Bakeries, Crust Pizza, and bb's Café, with a total of 1050 stores within Australia and New Zealand.

As of January 2020, there were over 250 Donut King stores in Australia and a number of stores internationally across New Zealand, Fiji, Saudi Arabia, Papua New Guinea, China and the United Kingdom. In July 2008, Donut King entered into a master licence agreement with Shanghai-based Mak Brands, marking the Australian brand's first foray into the China market. There are now 14 stores in China.

Donut King is not related to a restaurant with the same name that is located in St. Charles, Missouri, United States, or several other Donut King located across the United States.

== World's Largest Doughnut ==
On 5 December 2007, Donut King oversaw construction of the World's Largest Doughnut, in order to celebrate The Simpsons Movie's DVD release. It was created from over 90,000 doughnuts, using half a tonne of pink icing and 30 kg of sprinkles from Donut King. Taking 40 people over nine hours to build, the giant doughnut measured six metres and weighed 3.5 tonnes.

== See also ==
- List of doughnut shops
- List of restaurant chains in Australia
