= RFG =

RFG may refer to:

- Reformulated gasoline, a fuel
- Regional Amateur Football Groups (Bulgaria), in association football
- Retail Food Group, an Australian eatery franchisor
- RFG Taube, a c. 1910 German monoplane variant
- Rooke Field Airfield, Refugio, Texas, US (IATA:RFG)
- Red Faction: Guerrilla, a 2009 video game
