= Michel's Patisserie =

Australian café chain

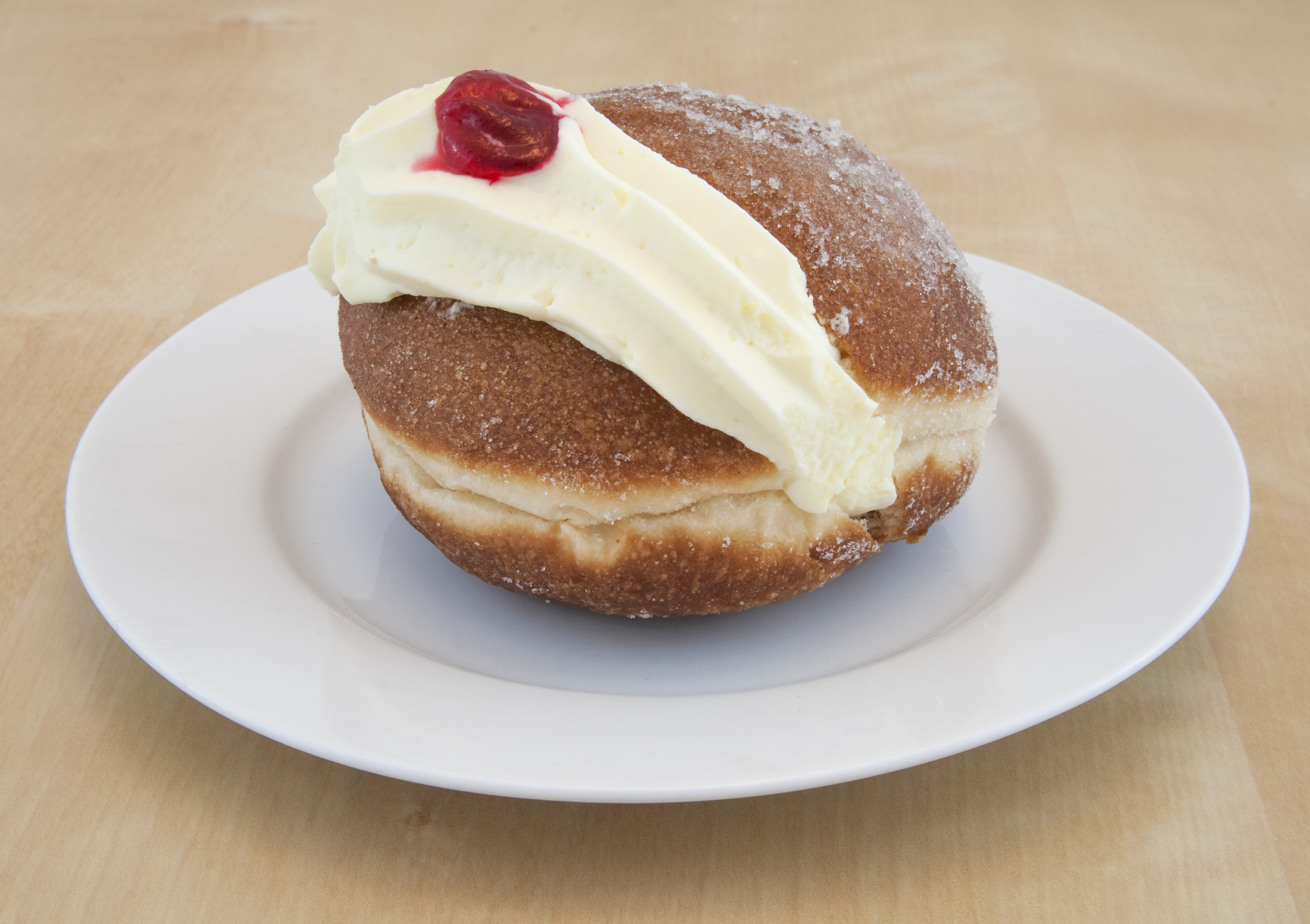
- Kitchener bun from Michel's Patisserie in Adelaide
- Founded: 1988
- Founder: Noel Roberts and Noel Carroll
- Headquarters: Sydney, Australia
- Number of locations: 360 in Australia, New Zealand, Indonesia, China
- Products: Cakes; coffee; beverages; pies
- Parent: Retail Food Group
- Website: www.michels.com.au

Michel's Patisserie is an Australian chain of bakery-style food outlets selling cakes, pies, savouries and coffees. The company is a franchise system that was founded in 1988 and had over 90 retail outlets in all Australian states and territories except for Tasmania. The chain employed approximately 4,000 staff and served approximately 36 million cups of coffee and 9.5 million slices of cake each year. It was the largest pastry chain in Australia. In 2016, Michel's Patisserie Toronto was judged to be National Retail Association Supreme Retailer of the Year.

The Michel's Patisserie franchise network is owned and managed by Retail Food Group (RFG), which also manages Gloria Jean's Coffees, Brumby's Bakeries and Donut King.

In February 2025, RFG announced the remaining 19 stores would be closed or converted to Gloria Jean's Coffees or Donut King locations, ending the 45 years of operation.

== History ==
Michel's Patisserie was founded by Noel Carroll and Noel Roberts in 1988. Their business model involves a central bakery that bakes products and distributes the products to outlets on a daily basis.

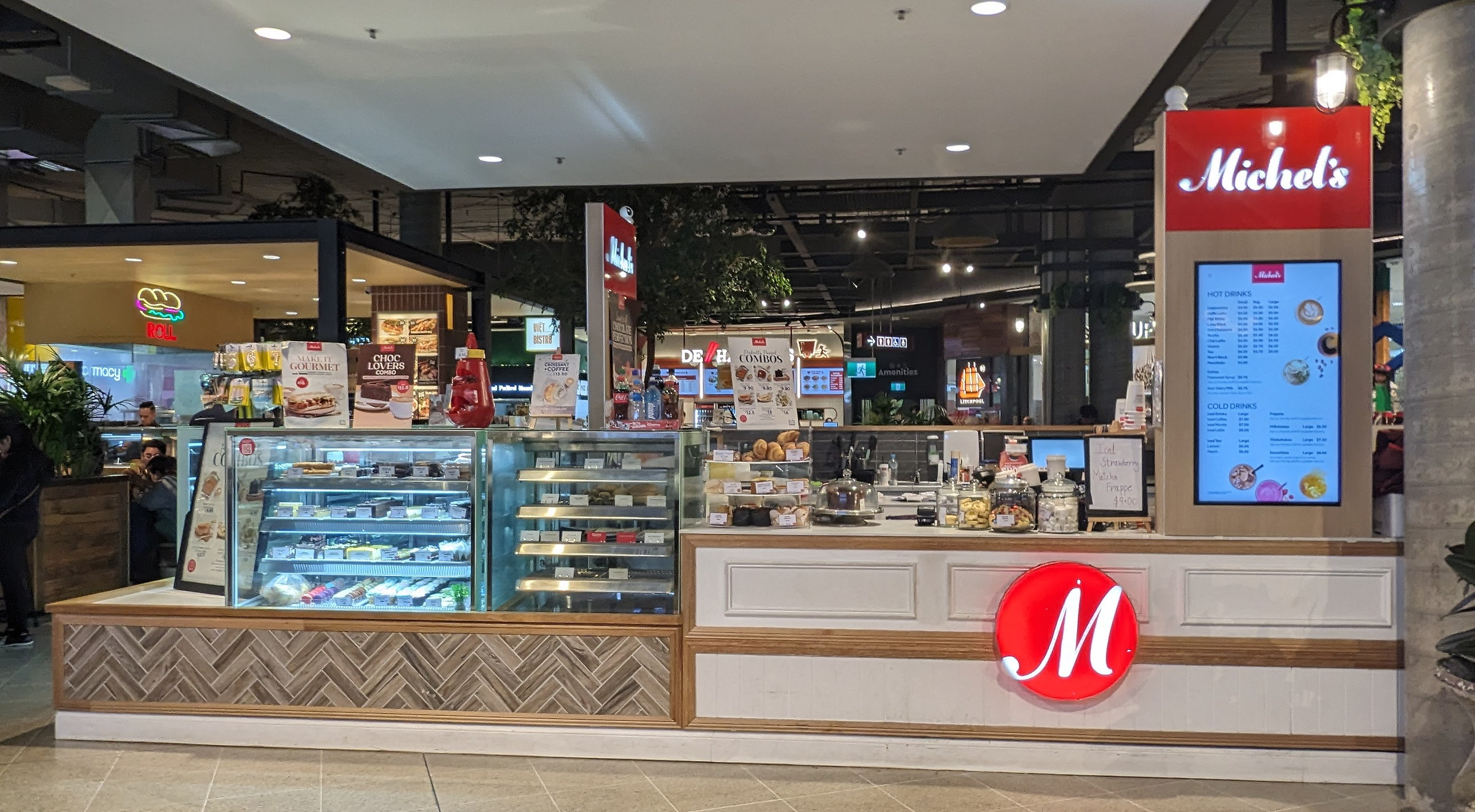
Westfield Liverpool location

The retail outlets act as points of sale, from where customers may purchase the products on display. After two years of research into all facets of the concept, distribution, store design and layout, marketing and training, the model was tested under full market conditions in stores located in Castlecrag and Newport before being launched as a franchise in 1990. The franchise reportedly won the 2007 Churner of the year award. In February 2006, Michel's Patisserie conducted a management buyout and merged with its master franchisee in Queensland and Victoria to create a single national franchise business.

The original Michel's Patisserie was started in Sydney by French chef Michel Cattoen and his wife Elisabeth in 1980.

As of 2013, Michel's Patisserie was active in Western Australia, with a store at Karrinyup Shopping Centre in Perth.

In 2015 and 2016, the company switched to supplying frozen cakes instead of fresh cakes to franchisees leading to a decline in product quality.

== Controversy ==
In December 2022, the Australian Competition & Consumer Commission won a civil court case against RFG resulting in Michel's Patisserie and Gloria Jean's franchises receiving repayments and debt erasures totalling $10 million as part of a settlement relating to allegedly illegitimate marketing expenses and allegedly being sold loss-making shops.

== See also ==
- List of coffeehouse chains
- List of restaurant chains in Australia
