= Toto's Pizza House =

First pizzeria established in Melbourne, Australia

- Industry: restaurants
- Founded: Australia (July 7, 1961)
- Defunct: 2020; 6 years ago
- Headquarters: Melbourne, Australia

Toto's Pizza House (Toto's) was the first pizzeria established in Melbourne, Australia, now a small chain of Pizza stores. Toto's opened for business on 7 July 1961 in Lygon Street, Carlton, Victoria, where the business remained until closing in 2020 due to Melbourne’s COVID lockdowns. Toto's was originally owned by Salvatore Della Bruna, who operated the business in partnership with Franco Fera and in 1968 with Silvio Tuli and Salvatore Mercogliano. Successful, and well respected, business man Mario Bandera also played a large part. In 1983 the business was purchased by the most recent owner and Managing Director, Sami Mazloum.

Silvana Mercogliano, the wife of former owner Salvatore Mercogliano, credited Toto's with changing the image of Lygon Street from an area with primary appeal to European migrants, commonly referred to as New Australians in the 1950s, to an eating destination of mainstream Australians in the 1960s. Professional historians have credited Toto's Pizza House with contributing to the development of pizza as an Australian fast-food staple.

In 2007 Toto's Pizza House was inducted as the second member of the World Pizza Hall of Fame, after Lombardi's Pizza in New York City, New York. Although the accolade was given on the basis that Toto's Pizza House was the first pizza bar in Australia, it was unknown at the time that Lucia's Pizza and Spaghetti Bar of Adelaide should hold this title having opened its doors in 1957.

== See also ==
- List of pizzerias in Australia
