= Beppi's Restaurant =

Australian restaurant

Coordinates: 33°52′31.5″S 151°12′50.5″E

- Interactive map of Beppi's Restaurant

Restaurant information
- Established: 12 July 1956
- Previous owner: Beppi Polese
- Food type: Italian
- Location: Australia

Beppi's Italian Restaurant is an Australian restaurant that was established on 12 July 1956 in Sydney, specializing in Italian cuisine and founded by Italian-born chef Beppi Polese and his wife Norma, who owned and ran the establishment with their family, including son Marc Polese. The restaurant is world famous, having served prime ministers, Hollywood stars, rock royalty and the elite.

== Beppi Polese ==
Founder Beppi Polese had worked and trained with Italian partisans during the Second World War as a restaurateur and worked in grand establishments in Venice, Milan Florence and Rome before emigrating to Australia in 1952. Known for his signature angel hair pasta and Vitello Tonnato, Polese was a pioneer, instrumental in creating Australia's love affair with Italian food, and he was nicknamed "The Godfather of Italian Cuisine."

Polese died in March 2016, at the age of 90, on the eve of the restaurant's 60th anniversary year.

== Media ==
There has been much media written and reported about the restaurant, as well as its founding chef. Author John Newton co-published a book entitled Beppi Polese: A Life in Three Courses, whilst writer and journalist David Dale won a Walkley Award for "The Italian Waiter Conspiracy."

The restaurant has been listed in Good Food Guide and is one of the oldest restaurants under the original ownership and location in Australia.

== See also ==
- List of Italian restaurants
- List of restaurant in Australia
- List of pizzerias in Australia
