= Pizza Showtime =

Defunct Australian restaurant and entertainment centre

Restaurant information
- Established: 1980
- Closed: 1984
- Previous owners: Allied & Leisure Industries
- Location: 148 Murray Street, Perth, Western Australia, Australia

Pizza Showtime was a family restaurant and entertainment centre operating in Perth, Western Australia from 1980 to 1984. Similar to the American Chuck E. Cheese chain it was a sit down pizza restaurant complemented by arcade games, and animatronic characters.

The restaurant was located in the now demolished Grand Theatre building, located at 148 Murray Street – a site now occupied by Grand Theatre Lane, showcasing a small cafe, and multiple storefronts. It featured space-invaders-style game consoles built into the customer tables operated with tokens, and had an animatronic stage show.

The animatronic stage show featured,

- a compère, a dog named 'Bert Newhound'
- a piano playing kangaroo known as 'Melton Pom' (next to a joey)
- singing koalas with 'Lottie' being the lead
- a wise cracking horse by the name of 'Ned Kelly'
- a dingo named 'Ringo Dingo', a dingo on the wall, who was in love with Lottie; Australian actor Jack Thompson was the voice for the "Ringo Dingo" character
- a violin-playing Black Bear - the only non-Australian character, who came from Gatlinburg, Tennessee, USA and played "The Devil Went Down to Georgia"

Creative input to the design of Pizza Showtime was supplied by Paul Gregory and John Franke. Gregory was appointed the manager of the Pizza Theatre Division of Allied and Leisure industries in October 1980. He immediately went on a two-week tour of the US's audio entertainment and fast food restaurants. Though not stated, this probably included Disney World and Chuck E. Cheese.

Gregory states that "some of the character names were changed from my original drawings, such as 'Hot Dog' turned out to be Ringo Dingo." On 6 February 2011 Gregory wrote that he designed the animatronic characters for Pizza Showtime based on a specific theme:

It started when the builders were gutting the inside of the 'Old Grand' theatre. We came across some very old posters of famous stars – Greta Garbo being one of them. So the story of PST developed from the fact that the Old Grand never had air conditioning – only a sliding roof, opened manually by chains – above the projection area. The story was born that this young projectionist assistant (who whilst watching Greta Garbo films every night) fell in love with her and on this hot summers night was overcome by the heat so he climbed out on top of the Grand and subsequently fell asleep. He stayed there for the rest of his days – hence the ghost and sound of chains that we had in the soundtrack.

I designed the characters around this theme, with no American input whatsoever apart from Black Bear which I did a trade for in Gatlinburg, USA, but all the characters were BUILT in the USA under my direction.

Franke was involved with Disney, particularly as a member of the Manufacturing and Production Organization (MAPO). MAPO was the group responsible for the creation and production of Disney's Audio-Animatronics. Franke's contributions at Disney included leading projects such as the creation of the Tiki Birds for Walt Disney's Enchanted Tiki Room, which was a pioneering effort in the field of animatronics.

Franke also designed the entrance to Pizza Showtime in Perth and played a part in the design of Pizza Showtime's animatronics.

The animatronic robots cost "in excess of $100,000" and are claimed to have had "more movements than any Disney character".

Pizza Showtime closed down around 1984 and the robot characters were dismantled and sent to Sydney. The restaurant was originally intended as a starter for a chain of 'Pizza Theatres' around Australia, owned and operated by Allied & Leisure Industries, along with Gregory under the supervision of A&L founder Malcolm Steinberg, who is the current owner of the Timezone arcade game franchise. The building was subsequently converted to an Asian food hall and was demolished in 1990.

== See also ==
- List of pizzerias in Australia
- List of restaurant chains in Australia
