= Rocco Pantaleo =

Australian businessman (1956–2010)

- Born: 9 September 1956; Calabria, Italy
- Died: 26 March 2010 (aged 53); St. Kilda, Victoria, Australia
- Occupations: Restaurateur, business entrepreneur
- Known for: Founding La Porchetta pizza chain

Rocco Pantaleo (9 September 1956 – 26 March 2010) was an Australian restaurateur, businessman and philanthropist.

== Biography ==
Pantaleo was born in Calabria, Italy and emigrated to Australia in 1977 to find work. In 1985 he co-founded the restaurant chain La Porchetta with Felice Nania, specialising in Italian cuisine. By the time of his death in 2010, it had grown to 80 restaurants across Australia, New Zealand, and Indonesia.

In 1996, he shot and killed Keith Lane. Lane had confronted Pantaleo over allegations that he had indecently assaulted a teenage waitress, Lane's niece. The court found that Pantaleo had acted in self-defence, but he was convicted of indecently assaulting the waitress. Pantaleo also had a string of driving offenses.

Pantaleo died on 26 March 2010 in a motorcycle accident in St Kilda, Victoria, where he was driving to attend the Melbourne Grand Prix. He was 53, he resided in Oak Park with his wife and four children.
