= Nabi Saleh (businessman) =

Australian businessman, commodities trader

- Born: Iran
- Occupations: Businessman; commodities trader
- Known for: Tea and coffee industry
- Title: CEO of Gloria Jean's Coffees
- Term: 1996–present
- Spouse: Angela
- Children: 2

Nabi Saleh (Persian: نبی صالح) is an Iranian Australian businessman and commodities trader, known for his role in purchasing Gloria Jean's Coffees and taking it worldwide. He also currently serves as an elder of the Hillsong Church.

== Life and career ==
Saleh was born in Iran and grew up in various countries including India. His family background is involved in the tea business (from his mother's side). He is married to Angela with daughters Nicole and Danielle, both of whom also work for Gloria Jean's. He holds a master's degree in physics, chemistry and mathematics.

Saleh followed his wife-to-be Angela to Australia in 1973. Lacking local work experience, he went to Papua New Guinea to help establish tea plantations with Australian New Guinea (ANG) Holdings. He oversaw the marketing and manufacturing of tea and coffee in Papua New Guinea and continues to consult with the Australian and PNG governments.

From 1978, Saleh developed Asco, a medium-sized coffee company from revenues of $250,000 to $15 million. Asco was then acquired by Burns Philp. He then started Columbia Coffee and Tea in 1983, Tea and Coffee Traders in 1986, and in 1989 established Maranatha Import Exports, representing ConAgra Foods in Australia. Maranatha supplied supermarket chains Woolworths, Coles, Franklins and David's Holdings.

Saleh also worked for Traveland International, where he was responsible for the procurement of hotel rooms worldwide.

In 1995, he purchased Gloria Jean's Coffees and a year later he formed Jireh International Pty Ltd, which now holds the global rights to Gloria Jean's franchising.

Saleh became a Christian in 1978 at a Kenneth Copeland convention, is a Pentecostal Christian was a board member of Hillsong Church until 2022.

== Other leadership roles ==
- Director of Southern Cross College of the AOG
- Director of Jerry Savelle Ministries International
- Director of Kenneth Copeland Ministries' Eagle Mountain International Church
- Gourmet Foods Australia
- Petra Gourmet Coffee
- Brothers Gourmet Coffees
- Maranatha Import Export (which sells private-label coffee to supermarkets)
- Director of Tea & Coffee Traders
