= Esquires =

Canadian multinational coffeehouse chain

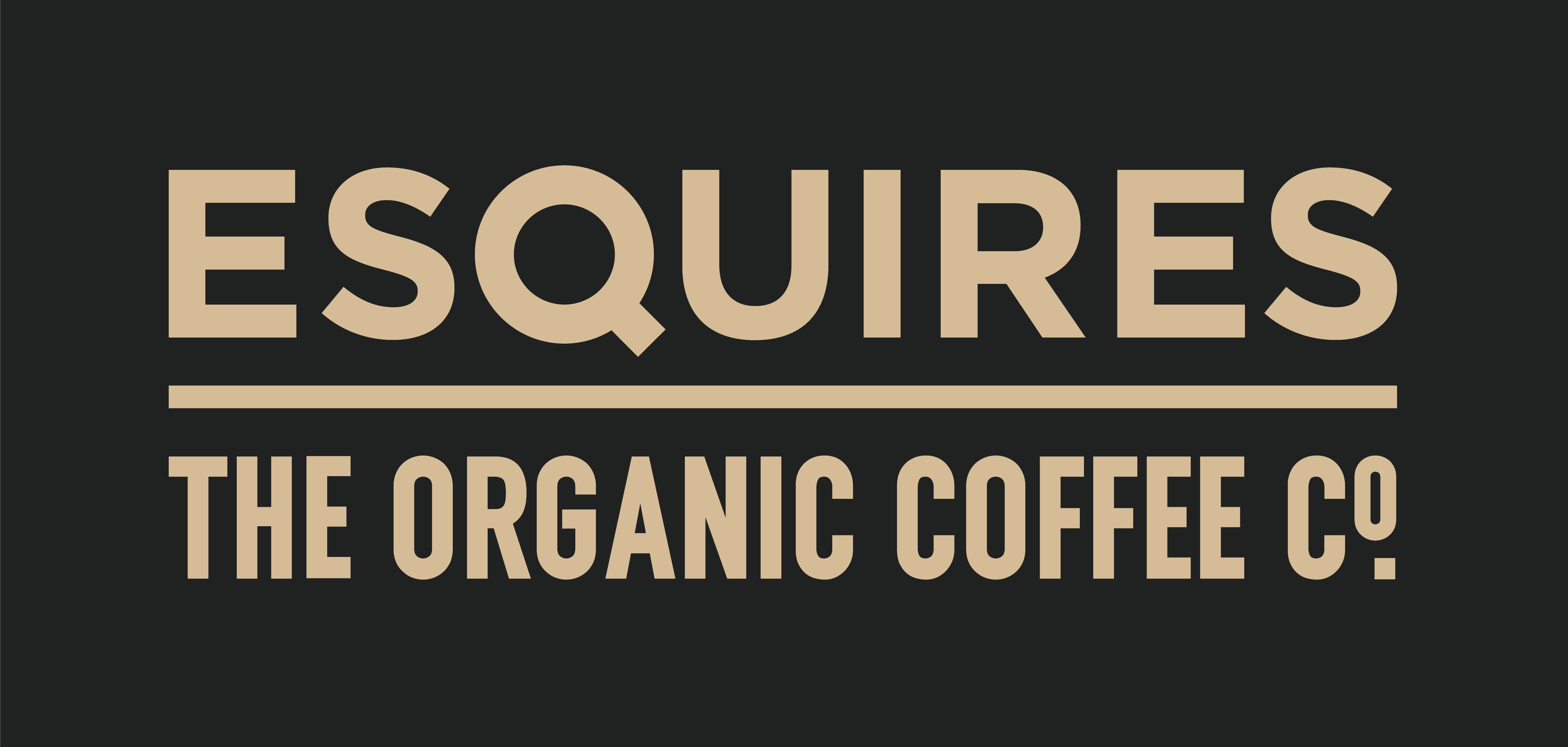
- Updated logo for Esquires Coffee
- Type: Public
- Industry: Cafés; Coffee Shops; Food & Beverages
- Founded: 1993, Canada
- Products: Coffee; Food; Baked Goods; Whole Bean Coffee; Loose Leaf Tea
- Website: www.esquirescoffee.com

Esquires, also known as Esquires Coffee or Esquires The Organic Coffee Company, is an international coffeehouse chain comprising more than 90 stores in the United Kingdom, Ireland, Portugal, Asia and the Middle East.

Founded by Doug Williamson and Gary Buckland in Canada in 1993, the intellectual property and trademark rights for the business are now owned by New Zealand-based Cooks Coffee Company globally.

== History ==
The first Esquires Coffee store opened in 1993 in Sunshine Hills, a residential district of Vancouver, Canada. The business was started by Doug Williamson and Gary Buckland, both 24-year-old entrepreneurs and local business graduates. Williamson was an accomplished television and film actor at the time, appearing in several films and starring in numerous television shows, and he credits the early success of Esquires to running the coffee house like a theatre production, casting the café with an ensemble whose primary purpose was to deliver a special experience to Esquires' guests.

In 1994, the founders brought in Peter E. Wudy, one of Canada's leading franchise consultants, to assist with expansion. With his guidance, Esquires Coffee expanded rapidly, opening 37 branches across Canada, primarily on the west coast of British Columbia. The company then began expanding internationally through a franchise model.

In 2000, Esquires Coffee entered the UK market, followed by Ireland in 2001. The master licence for Esquires Coffee UK was acquired by Peter Kirton, while Tony McVerry acquired the licence for Esquires Coffee Ireland.

In 2002, brothers Stuart and Lewis Deeks established the Esquires brand in Australasia through a master franchise agreement with the Canadian parent. Under the name Franchise Development Ltd (FDL), they grew the brand to become the leading coffee chain in New Zealand by store numbers.

In 2011, the Deeks sold the franchise rights for Australia and New Zealand to Retail Food Group but retained the rights to the Middle East and other jurisdictions.

In 2013, Stuart and Lewis Deeks merged their business into NZX and Aquis Stock Exchange London listed Cooks Coffee Company. Cooks acquired the intellectual property and master franchising rights to Esquires Coffee worldwide, excluding New Zealand and Australia. Doug Williamson, one of the original founders, re-joined the company to lead the UK business. Under his leadership, Esquires Coffee UK rebranded its 23-store estate and re-modelled Esquires Coffee as a franchise investment opportunity.

In April 2014, Cooks Coffee Company acquired the Esquires Canadian intellectual property rights, bringing the original Esquires franchisor under its control.

== Franchising ==
Esquires Coffee UK and Ireland operate as subsidiaries of Cooks Coffee Company, managed via Franchise Development (FDL), where it also directly franchises stores.

In Europe, Esquires Coffee operates in Portugal via Master Franchisees held with FDL.

In the Middle East, the brand operates stores in three Gulf Co-operation Council (GCC) countries: Saudi Arabia, Kuwait and Bahrain via Master Franchisees held with FDL. In 2018, stores opened in Jordan and Pakistan and began operations that same year.

In Asia, Esquires Coffee operates in Indonesia via Master Franchisees held with FDL.

== UK and Ireland leadership ==
Aiden Keegan joined Esquires Coffee as Operations Manager in Ireland before stepping into a Managing Director role of Esquires Coffee UK in 2018. In April 2024, Aiden was appointed Group CEO of Cooks Coffee Company. As Group CEO, he focuses on global expansion, ethical sourcing and sustainability.

Brendan Duigenan joined Esquires Coffee Ireland in 2019, bringing experience from senior roles at AMT Coffee and Starbucks Coffee. In April 2024, he was appointed Managing Director of Esquires Coffee Ireland. In this role, Brendan oversees the brand’s growth in Ireland.

== See also ==
- List of coffeehouse chains
