= Diedrich Coffee =

American coffee company

Diedrich Coffee, Inc
- Diedrich Coffee logo
- Type: Subsidiary
- Industry: Restaurants
- Founded: 1972; 54 years ago in Irvine, California
- Headquarters: Irvine, California
- Key people: J. Russell Philips, President and CEO; Sean McCarthy, Chief Financial Officer
- Products: Whole Bean Coffee; Food; Beverages; Merchandise
- Revenue: $52.5 mill. (FY2004 net) ▲ ($14.6 mill)
- Number of employees: 815 as of February 25, 2005
- Parent: Green Mountain Coffee Roasters
- Subsidiaries: Diedrich Coffee, Inc; Coffee People
- Website: Diedrich.com

Diedrich Coffee was a coffee company based in Irvine, CA. Its first coffee house in Orange County, California was opened in 1972.

== History ==
The history of the company started with Charlotte Diedrich inheriting a coffee plantation in Costa Rica in 1916. Her son, Carl Diedrich joined the business in 1946 and purchased a coffee plantation in Antigua, Guatemala, in 1966. The first coffeehouse, a roastery, opened in Newport Beach in 1972.

Diedrich Coffee, a neighborhood coffeehouse, was founded by Martin Diedrich in 1983. He took over the retail, roasting and importing facets of the family business from retiring Carl. In September 1996, Diedrich Coffee went public.

The company bought rival chain Coffee People, which also held the franchise rights to Gloria Jean's Coffees in the United States, in July 1999. In June 2004, Martin Diedrich resigned his position at Diedrich Coffee.

In September 2006, Diedrich Coffee announced plans to close its company-owned retail stores under the Diedrich and Coffee People brands, with 40 locations being sold to rival Starbucks and reopened under that brand. The company continued as a roaster and wholesaler of coffee beans and as the franchisor of the Coffee People and Gloria Jean's brands. The company also retained ownership of Coffee People stores inside the Portland International Airport.

In 2009, Diedrich Coffee sold its US Gloria Jean's franchises to the Australian-owned Gloria Jean’s Coffees International. As part of the deal, Diedrich retained the rights to use the Gloria Jean's brand in North America for wholesaling and Keurig coffee pods.

On November 3, 2009, California-based Peet's Coffee announced that it was buying Diedrich. On December 8, 2009, Vermont-based Green Mountain Coffee Roasters Inc. trumped the offer from Peet's Coffee and agreed to buy Diedrich for $290 million.

== See also ==
- List of coffeehouse chains
