= Pizza Capers =

Australian pizza chain

- Type: Subsidiary and franchise system
- Industry: Restaurant
- Founded: 1996; 30 years ago
- Defunct: 2026; 0 years ago
- Headquarters: Kenmore, Queensland, Australia
- Number of locations: 6
- Products: Pizza, Italian cuisine
- Owner: Retail Food Group
- Website: www.pizzacapers.com.au

Pizza Capers was an Australian fast food chain and franchise based in Queensland, Australia, that sold pizza and Italian cuisine. Whilst Pizza Capers mainly operated in its home of Queensland, it also previously operated in New South Wales, Australian Capital Territory and Victoria. The company is owned by parent company Retail Food Group. There were also some franchises in India, all of which are now closed.

In April 2012, Retail Food Group acquired the Pizza Capers Gourmet Kitchen brand system.

As of July 2026, Pizza Capers ceased operations with a post on their website thanking its customers for their loyalty and "making the journey a memorable one".

== See also ==
- List of pizzerias in Australia
- List of restaurant chains in Australia
