= Retail Food Group =

Australian franchising company

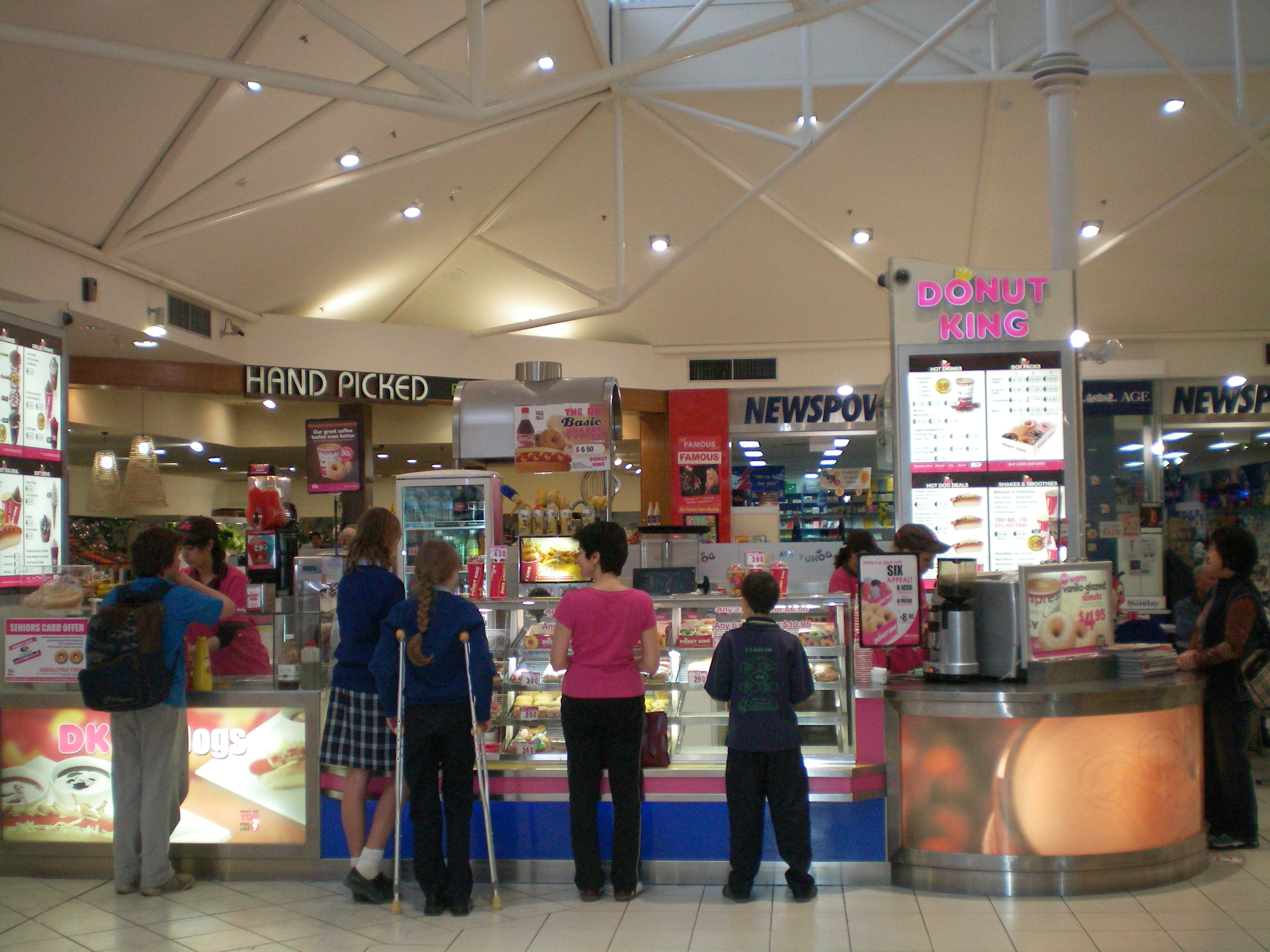
- A Donut King store in a shopping centre in Doncaster East, Victoria
- Type: Public
- Traded as: ASX: RFG
- Industry: Food; Quick service restaurants
- Founded: 1989; 37 years ago
- Headquarters: Robina, Queensland
- Number of locations: 1,201 (2026)
- Key people: Matthew Marshall (CEO); Peter George (Non-Executive Chairman)
- Website: rfg.com.au

Retail Food Group Limited, often abbreviated as RFG, is an ASX-listed company and Australian franchisor based in Robina, Queensland and operates locations in Australia and New Zealand. It owns numerous brands including Gloria Jean's Coffees, Brumby's Bakeries, Donut King, Di Bella Coffee, The Coffee Guy, Café2U, Pizza Capers and Crust Pizza.

== History ==
Established in 1989, Retail Food Group was incorporated in 2003 to act as a holding company for several fast-growing brand systems. The company roasts and supplies coffee to its network.

In April 2010, Retail Food Group purchased the franchising rights and intellectual property for Queensland-based pie chain Big Dad's Pies.

In February 2011, Retail Food Group acquired the Australian and New Zealand master franchise license for the Esquires Coffee House.

In 2012, RFG acquired the 118-store Pizza Capers Gourmet Kitchen and the 119-store Crust Pizza chain. In November 2014, RFG acquired The Coffee Guy brand system.

In August 2014, Retail Food Group announced it would purchase La Porchetta's franchising system for $16.3 million. Three months later, RFG pulled out of the deal.

In October 2014, RFG acquired the Gloria Jean's Coffees chain for A$163.5 million.

In November 2023, RFG made an agreement to acquire pie chain Beefy's Pies for A$10 million. In November 2024, RFG acquired the Cibo Espresso coffee chain from Retail Zoo for A$2.7 million.

In February 2025, RFG acquired the Australian master franchise for Firehouse Subs. The same month, RFG announced it would discontinue the Michel's Patisserie brand.

== Portfolio ==
=== Current brands ===
- Beefy's Pies has over 11 stores throughout Queensland.
- Brumby's Bakeries is a chain of Australian and New Zealand retail bakeries that was established in Ashburton, Victoria in 1975.
- Cibo Espresso
- Crust Pizza has over 110 stores throughout Australia.
- Donut King is a franchise system which was founded in 1981 in Sydney and specialises in donuts and coffee.
- Gloria Jean's Coffees is a franchised coffeehouse company that has opened more than 1,000 coffee houses across 39 markets worldwide, including over 460 stores in Australia.
- Cafe2U and The Coffee Guy are brand systems that operate under mobile coffee van models.
- Di Bella Coffee
- The Coffee Guy
- Rack 'em Bones BBQ Ribs

=== Former brands ===
- Big Dad's Pies
- Pizza Capers pizzeria chain. The brand shut down in 2022.
- Esquires coffeehouse chain
- Michel's Patisserie specialised in retail bakery-style food. The brand was discontinued in 2025.

== Controversy ==
A 2017 investigation by the Sydney Morning Herald noted that hundreds of franchisees were left financially devastated after investing in the brands under the RFG umbrella.

In December 2022, the Australian Competition & Consumer Commission won a civil court case against RFG resulting in Michel's Patisserie and Gloria Jean's franchises receiving repayments and debt erasures totalling $10 million as part of a settlement relating to allegedly illegitimate marketing expenses and allegedly being sold loss-making shops.

== See also ==
- List of pizzerias in Australia
- List of restaurant chains in Australia
