= Cinema City, Perth =

Former cinema in Perth, Western Australia,

Cinema City
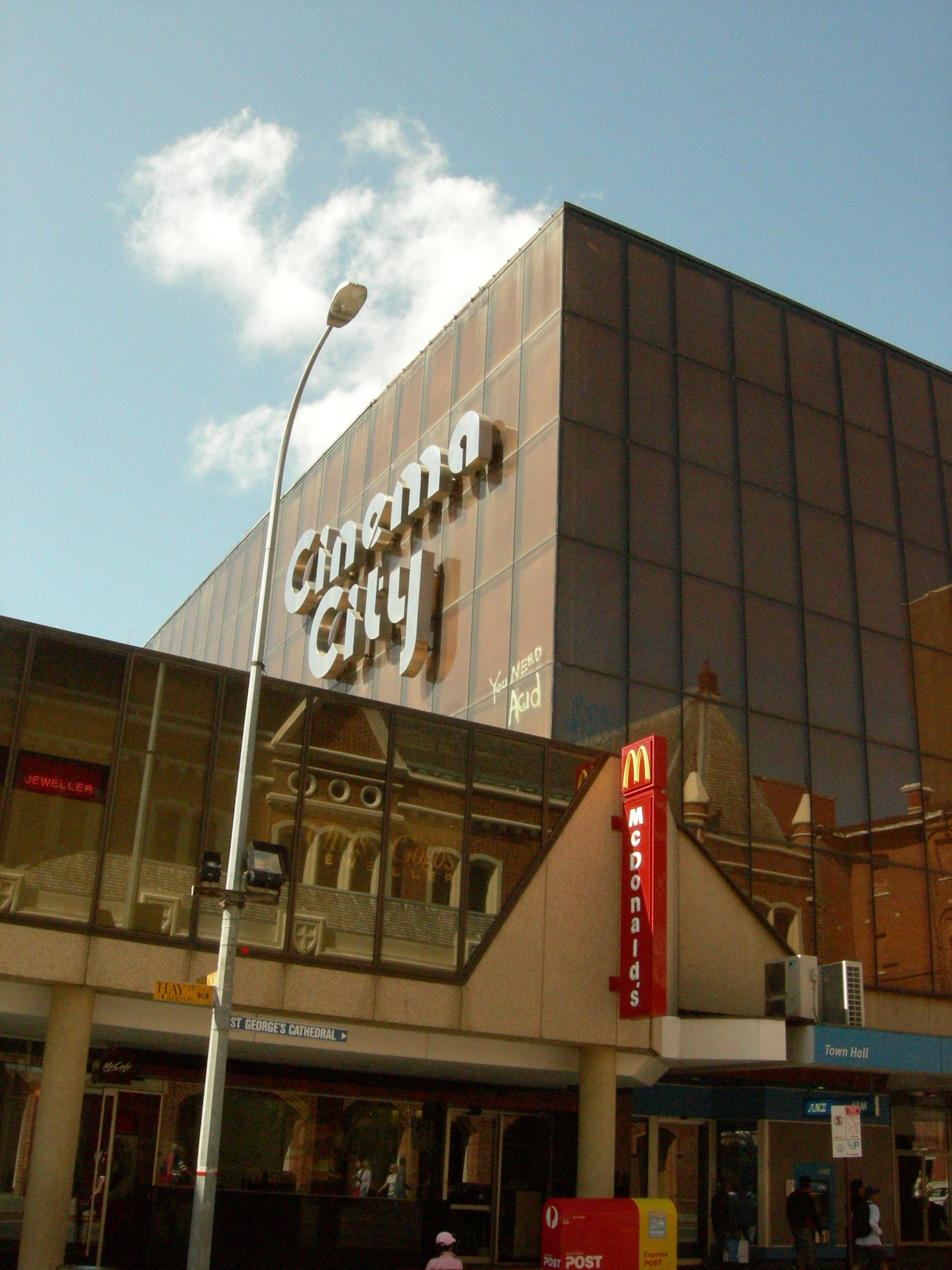
- Cinema City in 2007
- Interactive map of the Cinema City area

General information
- Status: Demolished
- Location: 580 Hay Street, Perth, Western Australia, Australia
- Coordinates: 31.954°S 115.861°E
- Opening: 6 November 1980
- Closed: 17 October 2007
- Demolished: January 2008

Design and construction
- Architect: Robert Day

Other information
- Seating capacity: 494 (cinema 1); 580 (cinema 2); 394 (cinema 3); 790 (cinema 4)

Cinema City was a multiplex cinema located on Hay Street in Perth, Western Australia. It operated from 1980 to 2007 and was demolished in 2008.

The building was notable to locals for its imposing architecture and spacious, futuristic interiors. At the time of its opening, it was the largest cinema complex in Western Australia.

== History ==
The cinema was first conceived by Sir James Cruthers of TVW. It was designed by Perth architect Robert Day who was also responsible for the design of the original TVW studio in Dianella.

Cinema City was opened on 6 November 1980 and was originally operated by Grand Cinemas. It had four screens with provisions for the construction of a fifth. Cinema 4 had stadium-style seating. At the time of opening, it was the largest cinema in Western Australia. It was capable of projecting most major film formats and had a custom-built Dolby audio system. An opening ceremony was held with a parade from Perth Entertainment Centre and Premier Charles Court in attendance. The first film shown at the cinema was The Blues Brothers.

The lobby featured a 14 metre high interior with chromed fittings and multi-coloured carpets. Six television screens displayed trailers for current and upcoming films. Media scholar John Hartley described the televisions in the foyer of Cinema City as an example of the breakdown between television and cinema in the 1980s.

The cinema won the WA Access and Mobility Committee's plaque for its accessibility features, which included lifts, space for wheelchairs, and emergency call buttons.

The first McDonald's franchise in Western Australia was opened at Cinema City in 1982.

In 1988, after a change of ownership at TVW, the cinema was taken over by Hoyts. The property was sold in 1999 to Westpoint Corporation for $13 million.

In 2001, Hoyts Cinema City won an award presented by the Disability Services Commission for "action on access in the private sector". Cinema City was the only cinema in Western Australia screening captioned films at the time.

On 17 October 2007, after 27 years of operation, Cinema City was closed. Demolition of the complex began in January 2008. Later that year, construction was started on the Equus skyscraper, a 27-storey residential and office building that stands on the site currently. The building was completed in 2011.
