= Pizza Haven (Australia) =

Australian and New Zealand pizza restaurant chain

- Type: Private
- Industry: Restaurant, franchising
- Founded: 1984 in Glenelg, South Australia, Australia
- Founders: Evan, Louis, Bill and Gabriel Christou
- Defunct: 2008 (Australia), mid-2000s (New Zealand)
- Fate: Acquired by Eagle Boys (2008) and Domino's Pizza (2005, New Zealand)
- Successor: Domino's Pizza, Pizza Hut
- Headquarters: Australia
- Area served: Australia, New Zealand, Thailand
- Products: Pizza, pasta, side dishes
- Parent: Domino's Pizza (New Zealand), Pizza Hut (Australia, via Eagle Boys)
- Website: pizzahaven.com.au

Pizza Haven was an Australian and New Zealand pizza restaurant chain and franchise operation.

== History ==
Founded in 1984, four brothers Evan, Louis, Bill and Gabriel Christou started Pizza Haven with the aid of a A$24,000 mortgage on their parents' home. The first Pizza Haven outlet was at Glenelg in Adelaide. Employing twelve people, the Christou brothers were active in the running of the business.

Pizza Haven evolved into a mid-sized franchised business model with approximately 180 outlets by the year 2000. A number of outlets were operated in Thailand during the mid to late 1990s.

In January 2005, the New Zealand Pizza Haven stores were bought by Domino's Pizza. The majority were converted to Domino's while some stores were able to stay branded under Pizza Haven. Eventually all New Zealand Pizza Haven stores became Domino's.

In July 2008, it was announced that Pizza Haven Australia had been acquired by the Eagle Boys pizza chain (which was in turn acquired by Pizza Hut in 2016). All remaining Pizza Haven stores were eventually converted to Pizza Hut stores.

== See also ==
- List of pizzerias in Australia
- List of fast-food restaurants
