= Global Yellow Pages =

Global Yellow Pages Limited
- Type: Public
- Industry: Real Estate Development, Directory Publishing
- Founded: 1967
- Headquarters: Singapore, Singapore
- Key people: Mah Bow Tan (Non-executive Chairman); Stanley Tan (CEO); Andrew Tay (Chairman, Audit Committee)
- Products: Real Estate, Internet Directories, Retail
- Website: www.yellowpages.com.sg

Global Yellow Pages Limited (GYP), previously known as Yellow Pages Singapore, is a real estate developer and digital search company. It was listed on the Singapore Exchange on 9th of December 2004. The company was based in Singapore, New Zealand and Australia. The company started in 1967 with the publication of the Yellow Pages telephone directories. Until 2015, the company's core activities were the publication of consumer and business directories and the sale of advertising in these directories. Specialised directories published by the company included Visitor's Guide Singapore and Singapore Infocomm Directory. Other services included online directories (Internet Yellow Pages) as well as database, digital marketing and other marketing related services.

At its Extraordinary General Meeting on 4 May 2015, shareholders approved the proposed diversification of the Company's core business to property investment, development and management. On 1 August 2017, GYP announced the publication of its final edition (2018) of the Yellow Pages print directories. It also announced the licensing of its brand and digital, data and online offerings to Yellow Pages Pte Ltd, a joint venture company. As of 31 August 2017, the company has a property portfolio of $126 million. As of 2017, the company has two wholly owned subsidiaries, GYP Properties and Global Food Retail Group.

== History ==
1 August 2017	GYP announced the final edition (2018) of the Yellow Pages print directories and the licensing of its brand and digital, data and online offerings to Yellow Pages Pte Ltd, a joint venture company.
16 November 2016	GYP completed the NZ$19.2m acquisition of freehold land of approximately 28,400 square metres located at Eastern Access Road, Queenstown, New Zealand. The development was named Remarkables Residences and was publicly launched with a full display suite at Five Mile Centre, Queenstown in June 2017.
4 May 2015	Shareholders approved the proposed diversification of the Company's core business into the businesses of property investment, development and management at its Extraordinary General Meeting. GYP also completed its NZ$96m acquisition of Pakuranga Plaza shopping centre, a freehold property in Auckland, New Zealand.
10 September 2014	GYP completed its A$10 million acquisition of the intellectual property rights for Wendy's Supa Sundaes, a brand of desserts and treats with an extensive network of stores across Australia and New Zealand.
12 July 2012	URA awarded the river taxi license to GYP and its consortium partner to provide river taxi and river tours from 1 January 2013.
29 February 2012	GYP secured the Microsoft Online Services Reseller Agreement and became one of a select group of Microsoft Office 365 syndication partners worldwide.
24 September 2010	GYP sealed an agreement with StarHub to offer business solutions to small and medium enterprises (SMEs) over the latter's Next Gen Nationwide Broadband Network.
17 September 2010	GYP acquired eFusion Solutions Pte Ltd, contributing to GYP's multi-platform business through its focus on call centres, marketing and marketing-related services, which complemented GYP's directories and database business.
9 July 2010	GYP acquired controlling stakes in Singapore's leading location-based service provider, ShowNearby Pte Ltd founded by Douglas Gan and Companedia Pte Ltd, a one-stop web agency for local SMEs. The latter was rebranded Global Digital Express Pte. Ltd on 5 August 2010.
10 June 2010	GYP enters into an agreement with Australia-based Qpay Pty Ltd to invest in a new company called Qpay Asia Pte Ltd to provide an online and/or electronic payment system which allows for payments and money transfers to be made thought the internet, mobile phones or other similar modes.
28 July 2009	Following the approval of shareholders at the Extraordinary General Meeting, the Company's name was changed to Global Yellow Pages Limited.
4 March 2009	Yellow Pages Singapore acquired Singapore Information Services Pte Ltd, a wholly owned subsidiary of IE Singapore Holdings Pte Ltd, for approximately S$6 million. Singapore Information Services is one of Singapore's leading trade directory publishers, publishing business-to-business trade directories to promote Singapore products and services worldwide.
9 December 2004	Yellow Pages Singapore listed on SGX-ST.
30 June 2003	Yellow Pages (Singapore) Pte Ltd, a company equally owned by two leading private equity firms in Asia JP Morgan Partners Asia and CVC Asia Pacific, acquired certain businesses, assets and liabilities of SingTel Yellow Pages Pte Ltd at S$220 million (with an additional S$6 million paid to SingTel Yellow Pages Pte Ltd as working capital adjustments relating to the acquisition).
23 May 2003	Yellow Pages (Singapore) Pte Ltd was incorporated.
1998	Integrated Information Pte Ltd was renamed SingTel Yellow Pages Pte Ltd (now known as “SingTel Interactive Pte Ltd”).
1985	General Telephone Directory Company (Singapore) Private Limited was renamed Integrated Information Pte Ltd after Telecommunications Authority of Singapore (TAS) fully acquired the company.
1975	A joint venture company was incorporated under the name of General Telephone Directory Company (Singapore) Private Limited owned as to 60% by Telecommunications Authority of Singapore (TAS) and 40% by General Telephone Directory Co. (GTDC).
1974	Telecommunications Authority of Singapore (TAS) and General Telephone Directory Company (Singapore) Private Limited (GTDC) signed a joint venture agreement to incorporate a company to acquire the business of GTDC's Singapore branch.
1967	Publication of Singapore telephone directory under the Singapore branch of GTDC.

== Yellow Pages Singapore ==
=== Singapore Phone Book Evolution ===
- 1962: as Singapore Telephone Book Telephone Directory (English-Chinese version) first published as a combined-volume bound white and yellow pages directory, the issue date is July 1962 and published by General Telephone Directory Company.
- 1965: The conversion from 2 to 4-column book.
- 1970: The White and Yellow Pages directories are separated into 2-books as a single-volume bounded directories with the change of issue date from July to October 1970 and published by General Telephone Directory Company (Singapore) Private Limited.
- 1990:
  - The Yellow Pages directory are no longer bound in a single-volume, later the market-segmented directories as: Yellow Pages - Buying Guide (B) and Yellow Pages - Commercial/Industrial Guide (C).
  - The White Pages directory are no longer bounded in a single-volume, later as White Pages - Business Listings and White Pages - Residential Listings (Central Singapore, East Singapore, North Singapore, North-East Singapore and West Singapore)
- 2009: As Global Yellow Pages, as Yellow Pages - Business, Yellow Pages - Consumer and Yellow Pages® Hotel.
- 2017: Global Yellow Pages announced that it will cease publication of Yellow Pages print directories from 2018.

== GYP Properties ==
GYP Properties is a holding company for GYP's New Zealand properties. It owns Remarkables Residences and Pakuranga Plaza, both registered in New Zealand.

== Global Retail Group ==
Global Food Retail Group, a subsidiary of Singapore-listed Global Yellow Pages. It bought Australian ice-cream and hot dog chain Wendy's Supa Sundaes for $10 million in September 2014.

== See also ==
- Electronic Yellow Pages
