= Gloria Jean's Coffees =

American-Australian retail coffeehouse chain

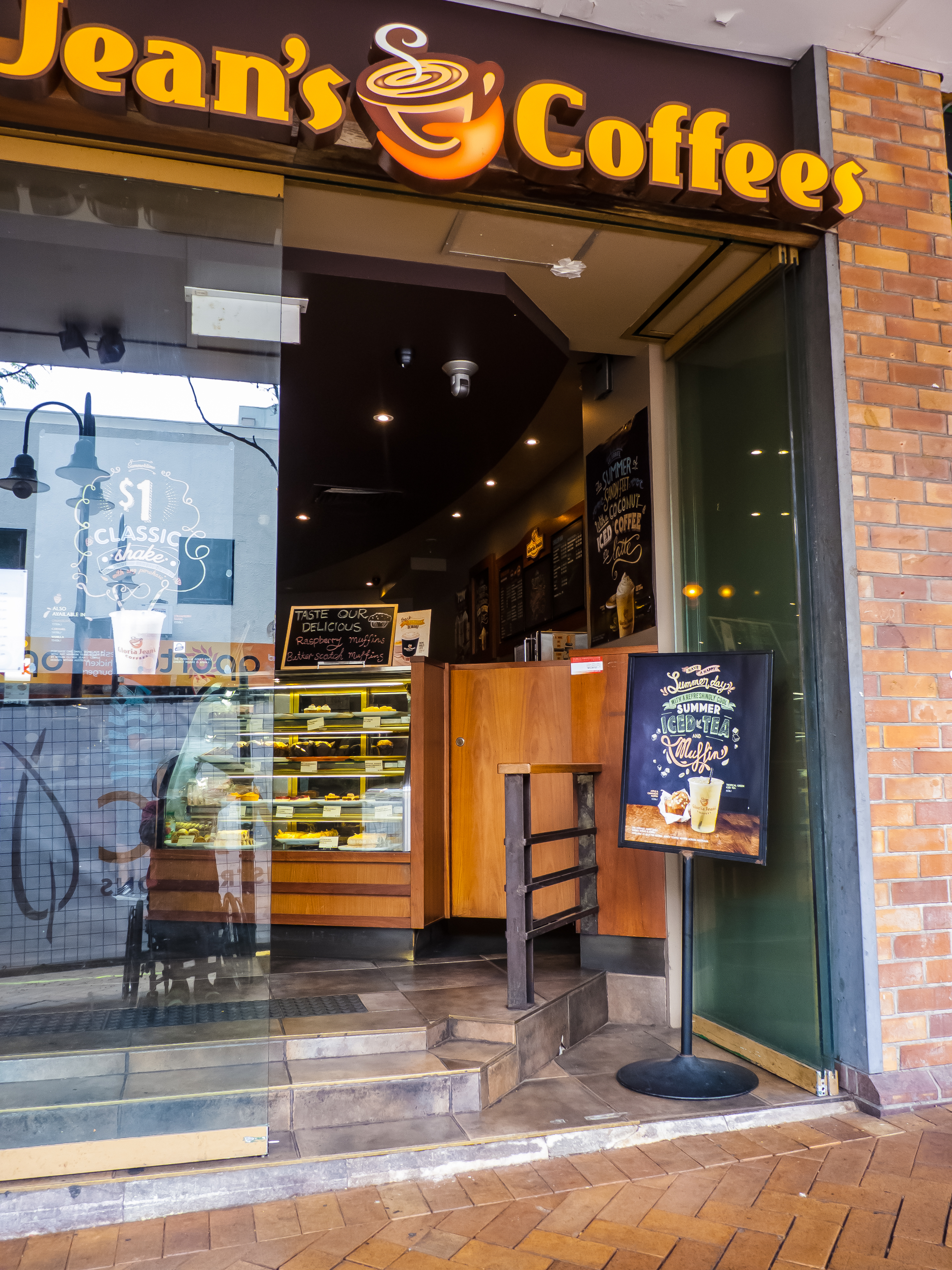
- Gloria Jean's store on Brunswick Street Mall in Brisbane, Australia
- Type: Subsidiary
- Founded: 1979; 47 years ago in Long Grove, Illinois, USA
- Founder: Ed & Gloria Jean Kvetko
- Headquarters: Castle Hill, New South Wales, Australia
- Number of locations: 599 in 40 countries
- Key people: Peter Irvine; Nabi Saleh
- Products: Hot and Cold Beverages
- Parent: Retail Food Group
- Website: www.gloriajeans.com

Gloria Jean's Coffees (commonly shortened to just Gloria Jean's) is an Australian-American retail coffeehouse brand headquartered in Castle Hill, Sydney. The chain is owned by the multinational fast casual restaurant conglomerate Retail Food Group and has more than 599 stores in 40 countries, including over 140 in Australia.

== History ==
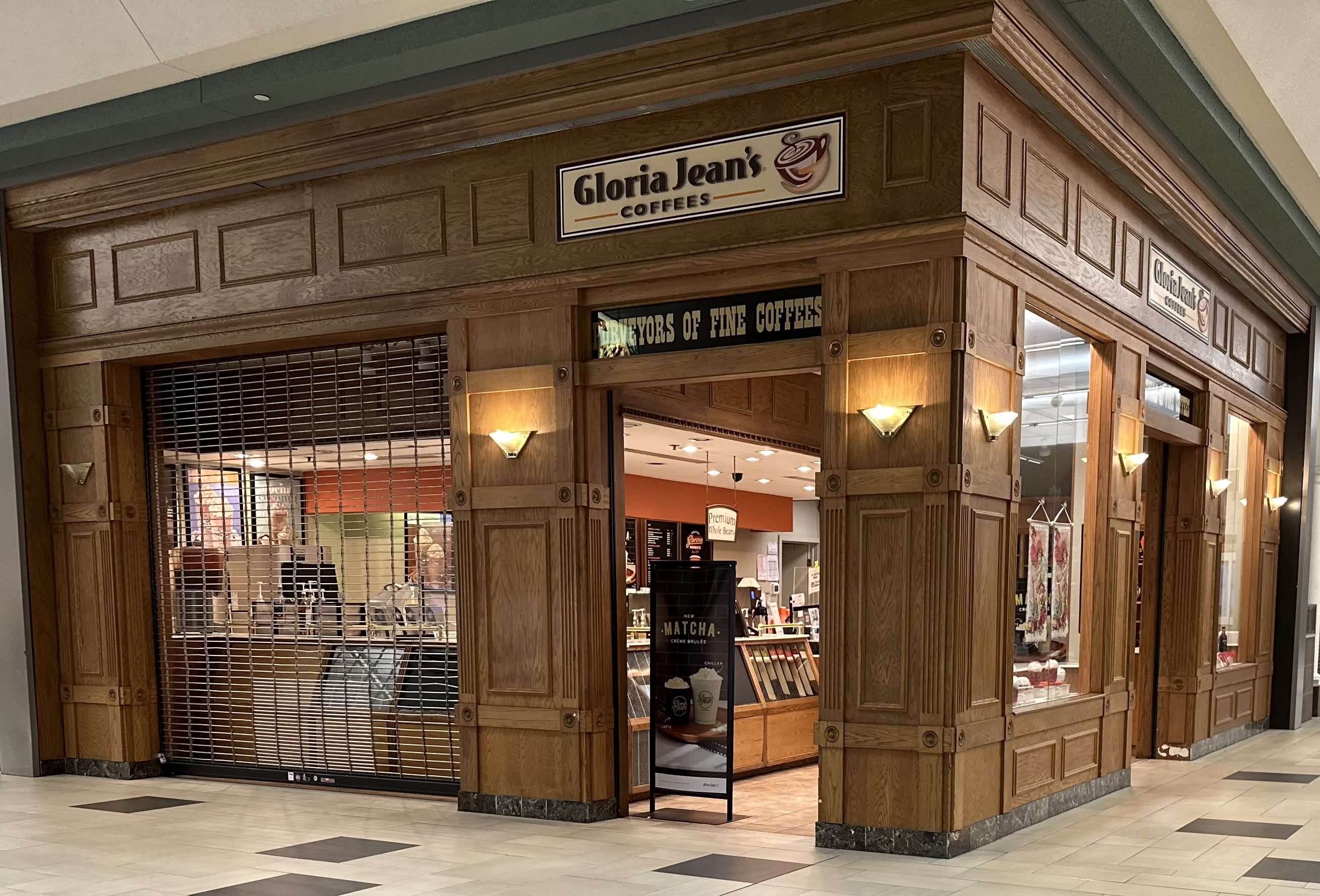
Vintage Gloria Jeans, Rivergate Mall

Gloria Jean's Coffees was founded by Gloria Jean Kvetko in Long Grove, a small town just outside Chicago, Illinois, United States in 1979. The brand began as a small coffee and gift shop in the Chicago area and grew to over 50 locations in the United States after the franchising rights were purchased by the chain Coffee People.

=== International expansion (1995–2009) ===
In 1995, Nabi Saleh and Peter Irvine, former managing director of advertising agency DDB Needham, established Gloria Jean's Coffees Australia and acquired the rights to franchise Gloria Jean's Coffees in Australia from owner Coffee People.

In late 1996, Gloria Jean's Coffees Australia opened its first Gloria Jean's coffee house at Westfield Miranda, Sydney, and two weeks later another at Westfield Eastgardens, also in Sydney.

In early 1998, Gloria Jean's Coffees Australia franchised its first store and within six years had opened 185 stores owned and operated by more than 100 franchisees.

In July 1999, Diedrich Coffee acquired Coffee People, the US owner of the Gloria Jean's Coffees brand.

In 2003, Gloria Jean's Coffees Australia opened a franchise in Darwin, Northern Territory, making the brand available in every Australian state and territory.

In 2004, Gloria Jean's Coffees Australia purchased the branding and roasting rights for all territories outside of the United States of America and Puerto Rico from Diedrich Coffee and established Gloria Jean's Coffees International to handle non-Australian brand and franchising operations.

=== Consolidation (2009–present) ===
Gloria Jean's Coffees International purchased the US and Puerto Rican franchise rights to Gloria Jean's from Diedrich Coffee in 2009, giving the company exclusive worldwide franchising rights. As part of the deal, Diedrich retained the rights to use the Gloria Jean's brand in North America for coffee wholesaling operations and Keurig coffee pods.

In 2013, Yellow Pages Singapore announced it would purchase the Australian and international operations of Gloria Jean's in a AU$35.6 million deal. Yellow Pages Singapore later pulled out of the deal and in 2014 Gloria Jean's was purchased by Retail Food Group for $163.5 million.

== Controversies ==
=== Sugar and fat content ===
In 2009, Gloria Jean's was criticised for the sugar and fat content of some of their products. Analysis of a regular 'Gloria Jean's Mocha Chiller Coco Loco' revealed it contained 95.5 grams (3.37 oz) of sugar, which is 106 percent of an adult's recommended daily intake. They have also been criticised for failing to provide nutritional information to their customers. Gloria Jean's now provides nutrition and ingredient information.

=== Coffee supply ===
In April 2010, Gloria Jean's Australia was accused of breaking a joint venture agreement with a small US-based coffee supplier, Western Export Services. The matter was resolved in the High Court of Australia, in October 2011, with Western Export Services' appeal being dismissed.

=== Financial support for the Australian Christian Lobby ===
In November 2010, in the lead up to the Australian Federal Election, Gloria Jean's donated $30,000 to the Australian Christian Lobby (ACL). This donation and Gloria Jean's links to the evangelical Hillsong Church led to a national boycott of its stores. Social media campaigns in support of the boycott on Facebook and a petition on Change.org resulted in thousands of supporters. As a direct result of this donation, national youth mental health foundation headspace pulled out as a partner of the suicide awareness campaign R U OK?, of which Gloria Jean's was a major sponsor. Gloria Jean's released a statement on 11 June 2012 stating "this was a once off donation". Both Gloria Jean's and the ACL claim that the monies were provided as advertising.

Change of management in December 2014 has led some LGBT community members to question the relevance of a continuing boycott.

=== Underpayment of wages ===
In February 2014, a Gloria Jean's franchise in the Melbourne suburb of Caulfield was fined $110,000 for underpaying staff following an investigation by the Fair Work Ombudsman which found that 22 workers were paid as little as $8 per hour (or around half the minimum wage).

=== Loss-making shops and illegitimate marketing expenses ===
In December 2022, the Australian Competition & Consumer Commission won a civil court case against the owner of Gloria Jean's, Retail Food Group, resulting in Michel's Patisserie and Gloria Jean's franchises receiving repayments and debt erasures totalling $10 million as part of a settlement relating to allegedly illegitimate marketing expenses and allegedly being sold loss-making shops.

== See also ==
- List of coffeehouse chains
- List of restaurant chains in Australia
