= Domino's Pizza Enterprises =

Australian franchise of Domino's Pizza

Domino's Pizza Enterprises Ltd.

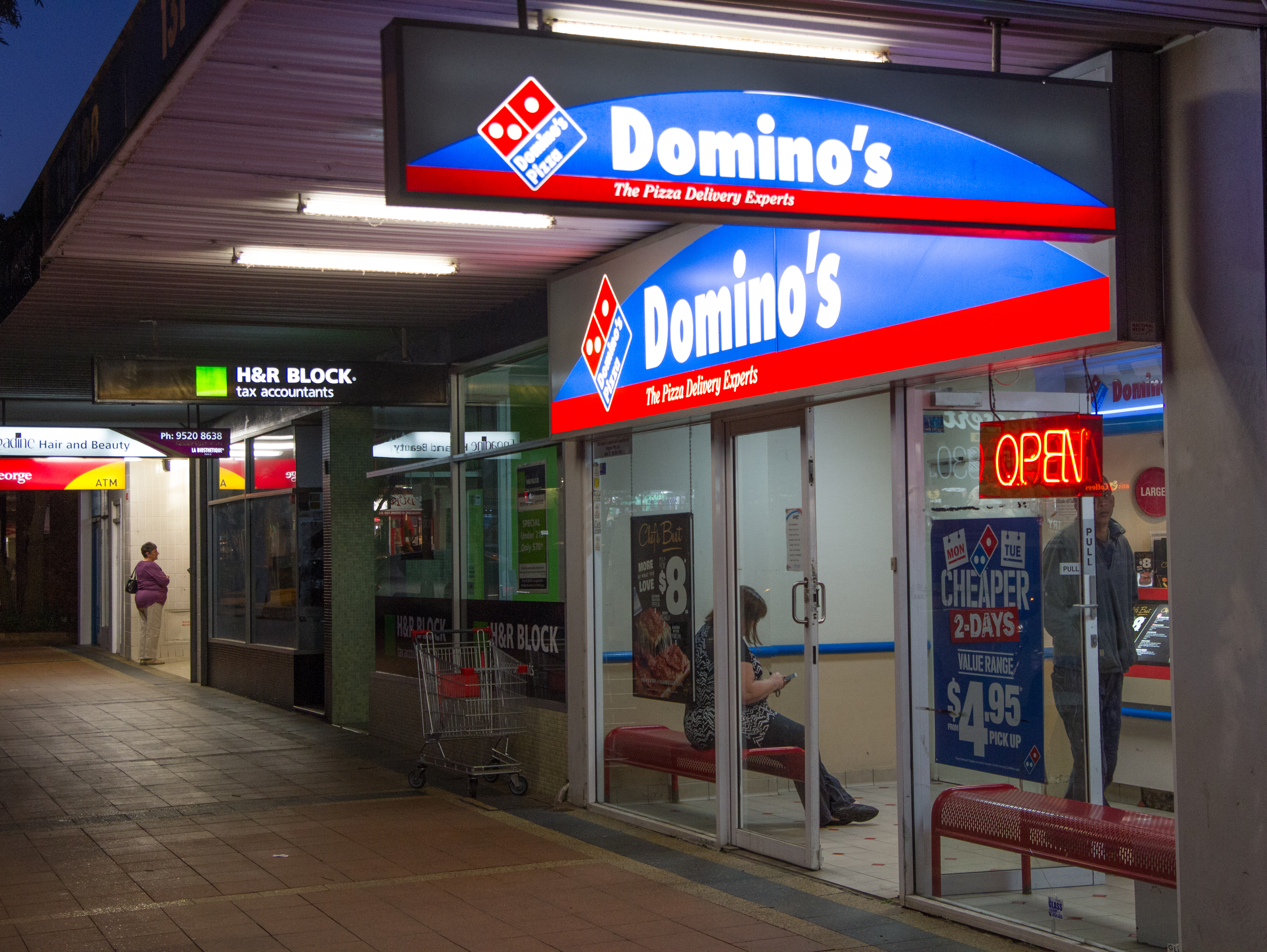
- Engadine, New South Wales location
- Type: Public
- Traded as: ASX: DMP; S&P/ASX 200 component
- Industry: Food retail
- Founded: 1983; 43 years ago, in Springwood, Queensland, Australia
- Headquarters: Hamilton, Queensland, Australia
- Number of locations: 3,700+ across Australasia Europe and Japan
- Key people: Andrew Gregory (Chief executive & Managing Director)
- Products: Pizza
- Revenue: ▲ A$2,376.7 million (2023/24)
- Net income: ▲ A$92.3 million (2023/24)
- Number of employees: 65,000 (2020, including franchisee employees)
- Website: dominos.com.au

Domino's Pizza Enterprises Ltd. (DPE) is the largest pizza chain in Australia in terms of network stores numbers and network sales, as well as the largest franchisee for the US Domino's brand in the world. DPE is the exclusive master franchise for the Domino's brand network in Australia, New Zealand, Belgium, France, The Netherlands, Japan, Germany, Luxembourg, Taiwan, Malaysia, Singapore, and Cambodia. As of January 2025, across these markets, DPE has over 3,700 stores. In May 2005 DPE became the first publicly listed pizza company in Australia.

In 2018, Domino's was inducted into the Queensland Business Leaders Hall of Fame.

== History ==
=== Australia ===
The first Domino's store to open in Australia was in Springwood, Queensland, in 1983, and offered home delivery after home delivery was introduced into Australia by the Pizza Oven Family Restaurants located at multiple sites all over the southside of Brisbane owned by Paul Hughes & Bill Kerwick in 1981. The Australian and New Zealand Master Franchise was bought by Silvio's Dial-a-Pizza in 1993. In 1995, the two brands merged and rebranded as Domino's Pizza.

In 1997, Domino's established the Domino's Partners Foundation. In 2000, Silvio's Dial-a-Pizza was renamed Domino's Pizza Australia. In 2001, Don Meij and Grant Bourke, the two largest franchisees at the time, merged their stores into the corporate store network to bring the total number of stores to 50 corporate stores and 128 franchised stores.

In 2005, Domino's Pizza Australia was listed on the Australian Securities Exchange, becoming the first publicly listed Australian pizza company. In 2009, Domino's Australia launched an application on iPhones. In 2011, the company launched an online ordering mobile website and an application for ordering on Android devices.

By 2013, Domino's had launched its 500th Australian store in Melbourne's Beaconsfield suburb, becoming Australia's largest pizza chain in terms of store numbers and sales. In 2013, the company launched Pizza Mogul, an initiative to boost customer retention via social media. In 2015, Domino's launched GPS Driver Tracker, which allows customers to track their orders from the store.

In 2016, Domino's Australia launched the world's first autonomous delivery vehicle Domino's Robotic Unit (DRU). That same year, the company launched the registered charity Giver for Good. In 2017, Domino's Australia installed the world's largest commercial Tesla Powerwall battery storage system in one of its Sydney stores to overcome the limited capability of the electrical grid.

Currently, there are around 700 Domino's stores in Australia, making it the biggest pizza franchise business in the country. The Australian stores are spread across the country, from the main capital cities like Canberra, Melbourne, Adelaide, and Sydney, to more rural areas like Armidale.

In mid-August 2024, Kerry Hayman succeeded her brother Meij as CEO of Domino's Australia and New Zealand. Between 2023 and 2024, Domino's Pizza Australia faced declining revenue internationally due to competition from home delivery service Uber Eats and in response closed some stores in international locations.

In November 2024, Meij announced his retirement effective from 6 November 2024, to be succeeded by Mark van Dyck.

In May 2025, Hayman announced her impending resignation to take effect in August.

=== New Zealand ===
In 2003, Domino's entered the New Zealand fast food market, competing with both rival pizza chain Pizza Hut and local pizza chain Hell Pizza.

In January 2005, Domino's acquired the Australian pizza chain Pizza Haven's 35 New Zealand stores. By that stage, Domino's had 16 stores based in the North Island; with the acquisition bringing the total number of Domino's-owned stores across New Zealand to 51. Most Pizza Haven stores were given the option of converting to Domino's stores while some stores were able to stay branded under Pizza Haven. All New Zealand-based Pizza Haven stores subsequently converted to Domino's.

Domino's New Zealand was the first to introduce drone-delivery pizza in November 2016, partnering with Flirtey Drone Delivery.

In November 2021, Dominos's New Zealand signed up to animal welfare group Animals Aotearoa's "Better Chicken Commitment" to avoid using fast-growing chickens.

In April 2023, SkyDrop became the first New Zealand company to gain approval from the Civil Aviation Authority to launch regular drone home deliveries for Domino's in Huntly.

In January 2024, Domino's New Zealand launched a Māori language menu in collaboration with the Māori Language Commission.

=== Europe ===
By 2013, Domino's Pizza Enterprises had acquired Domino's operations in France, Belgium, and the Netherlands. By 2018, the company had also acquired Domino's operations in Monaco, Germany and Luxembourg.

In 2019 Domino's Pizza Enterprises acquired Domino's Pizza Scandinavia's stores in Denmark. In 2023, the company announced plans to close its 27 Danish stores due to their poor economic performance and as part of a restructuring of its global operations.

In mid-July 2024, Domino's confirmed plans to close 20-30 stores in France due to declining revenue and stock performance.

=== Asia ===
By 2018, Domino's Pizza Enterprises had acquired Domino's operations in Japan.

In 2021, Domino's Pizza Enterprises acquired Domino's Pizza Taiwan. In 2022, the company acquired Domino's Pizza businesses in Malaysia, Singapore, and Cambodia.

In mid July 2024, Domino's confirmed it was closing 80 stores in Japan due to declining stock performance and revenue.

In August 2024, Domino's Singapore and Malaysia's chief marketing officer Linda Hassan was included in the Asia-Pacific Power List 2024. As chief marketing officer, she had introduced GPS tracking for Malaysian and Singaporean stores, recycled packaging, water saving devices and electrical bikes.

In February 2025, Domino's Pizza Enterprises announced plans to close 205 loss-making stores including 172 Japanese stores, 23 Europeans stores and four in Australia and New Zealand in order to safeguard the company's financial viability. These closures were expected to generate between $10-$12 million in annualised earnings before interest and taxation.

== Issues and controversies ==
=== Business practices ===
In June 2024, a study released by the University of Sydney's School of Public Health reported that Domino's and other multinational fastfood chains including McDonald's and KFC had worked with several Australian media companies including News Corp Australia, Nine Entertainment and MailOnline to produce covert marketing for their products between July 2021 and June 2022. The study found that the Australian Broadcasting Corporation and Guardian Australia did not produce covert marketing for the fastfood chains due to their editorial policies banning the endorsement of commercial products.

In November 2025, reports of conflict between franchisees and Dominos Pizza Enterprises were raised by 128 franchise owners, requesting an immediate reduction in franchise fees as a result of tension between the ASX listed company and their restaurant owners. Franchise owners representing 350 of the Australian stores had been negotiating with the franchise for months leading up to the demand, with franchise owners accusing the company of making it impossible for them to make decent money. Executive Chairman, Jack Cowin described the franchise owners as “disgruntled, squeaky wheels” and referred to them as “under performers”

=== Labour issues ===
In July 2024, the New Zealand Ministry of Business, Innovation and Employment (MBIE) prosecuted Domino's Kaiapoi franchise owner Chang-Wei Tsao for migrant exploitation. Tsao pleaded guilty to six charges of migrant exploitation including forcing employees with student visas to work beyond their time limits and visa expiry dates. He was sentenced to ten months home detention by the Christchurch High Court and ordered to pay $7,062 in reparations.

=== Legal issues ===
In early September 2024, legal consultancy Echo Law filed a shareholder class lawsuit against Domino's Pizza Enterprises for allegedly misleading investors about its expected performance in Japan. Domino's denied any liability and said it would defend the charges.

In mid-December 2023, Domino's Singapore and the Singapore Police Force issued a warning to customers about a phishing scam involving fake Domino's websites and competitions. According to Channel News Asia, this phishing scam had affected seven people, with losses amounting to about S$27,000.

=== Religious controversies ===
In mid-May 2024, Domino's Malaysia expressed regret after a customer in Penang included anti-Islamic remarks in the remarks section of their online order. Barat Daya District Police chief Supt Kamarul Rizal Jenal confirmed that the Royal Malaysian Police were investigating the incident. Following multiple police reports, authorities arrested four foreign nationals in connection with the case. The investigation was conducted under Section 298 of the Penal Code and Section 14 of the Minor Offences Act, which cover offences related to hurting religious feelings and using insulting or abusive words with intent to provoke a breach of peace. Domino’s Malaysia stated that they do not tolerate discrimination or offensive remarks and expressed disappointment over the customer’s comments.

== Animal welfare ==
In 2022, Domino's Pizza Enterprises was given the Cage Free Award from Compassion in World Farming, an animal advocacy organization, in recognition of the company's work to end the use of cages in its European supply chain. The organization has pledged to abide by the Better Chicken Commitment in its European operations (as of 2020) and in its New Zealand and Australian operations (as of 2021).

== See also ==
- List of fast food restaurant chains in Australia
- List of pizzerias in Australia
