= Don Meij =

Australian businessman (born 1968)

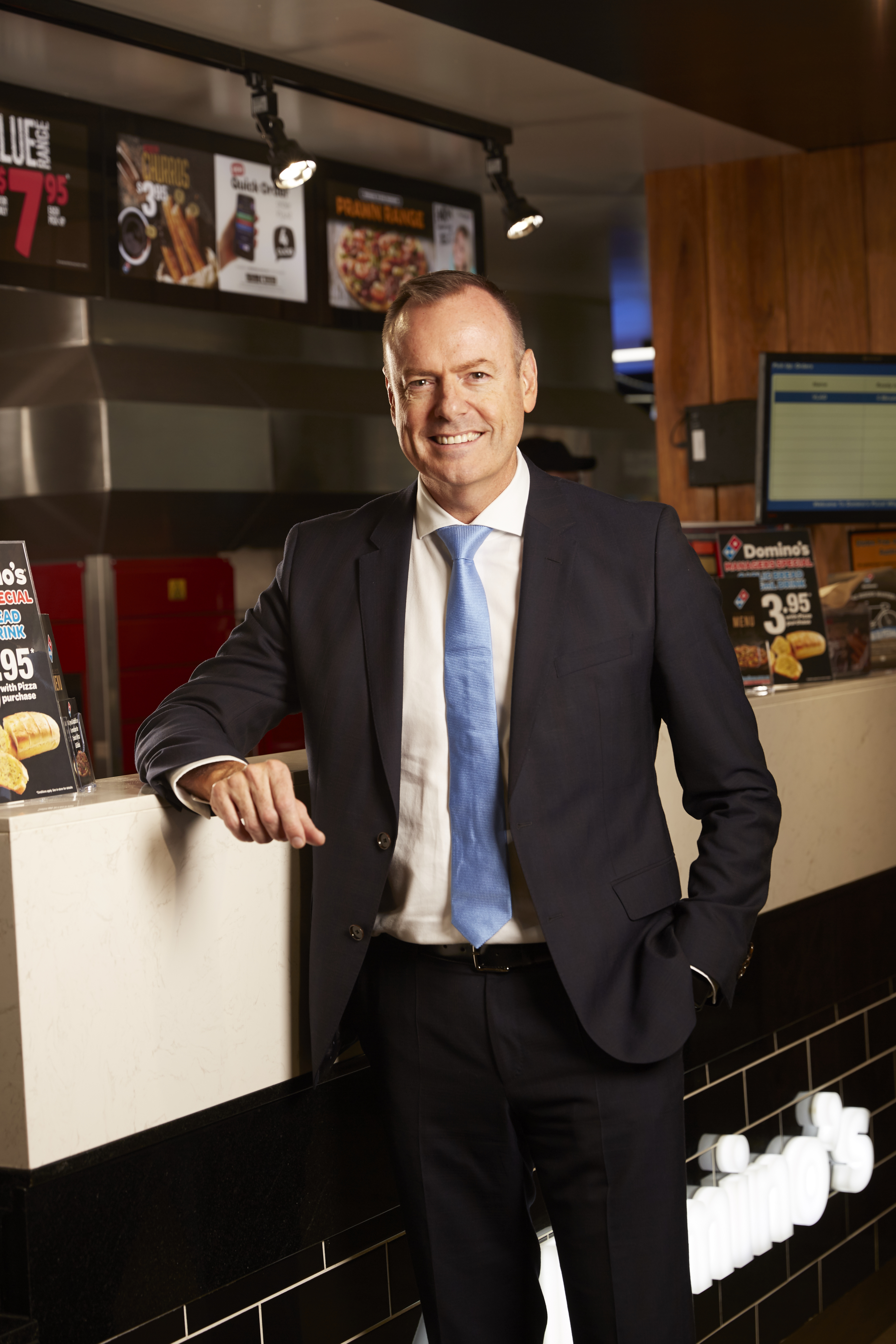
- Born: 27 December 1968 (age 57); Rockhampton, Queensland, Australia
- Occupations: CEO and managing director of Domino's Pizza Enterprises
- Years active: 2002–present

Donald Jeffrey Meij (/meɪ/, born 27 December 1968) is an Australian business entrepreneur who served as the group chief executive officer and managing director of Domino's Pizza Enterprises until August 2024.

After commencing as a pizza delivery driver in 1987 in Redcliffe, Queensland, for Silvio's Dial-a-Pizza while studying to be a high school teacher, Meij fell in love with the business and has since worked his way up the ranks.

In May 2005, Meij led Domino's to become Australia's first publicly listed pizza chain on the Australian Securities Exchange (ASX).

== Early life ==
Meij, the middle child, was born in Rockhampton and grew up in Papua New Guinea for five years, then lived in north Queensland for five years before his family moved to Brisbane. He was raised in Brisbane along with two sisters. Meij attended Clontarf Beach State High School in Queensland and studied to be a teacher at the Queensland University of Technology, Kelvin Grove Campus, from 1987–1989 whilst working as a pizza delivery driver at Silvio's Dial-a-Pizza. He eventually left tertiary studies to pursue a career in the pizza industry.

== Career ==
After working as a delivery driver for Silvio's Dial-a-Pizza in 1987, Meij was promoted to store manager in 1989. From 1991 to 1993, Meij climbed the corporate ladder, progressing from Area and State Operations Manager to Director of National Operations. In 1993, Silvio's Dial-a-Pizza acquired Domino's in Australia, and Meij became General Manager.

Meij became a Domino's franchisee in 1996, with his ex wife Esme, together building a network of 17 stores. In 2001, he sold his stores to Domino's Pizza Enterprises Ltd for 12.5% equity in the company. He became Chief Operating Officer in 2001 and then Chief Executive Officer in 2002.

In May 2005, Meij led Domino's to become Australia's first publicly listed pizza chain on the Australian Stock Exchange (ASX). In 2013, Domino's acquired 75% of Domino's Japan and Meij made Australia's top CEO list.

Domino's Pizza Enterprise Limited now owns and operates more than 2,400 stores in Australia, New Zealand, Belgium, France, the Netherlands, Japan, Germany, Luxembourg and Denmark.

In 2017, Meij celebrated 30 years with Domino's, which today is the market leader in most of the countries in which it operates.

In mid-August 2024, Meiji stepped down as CEO and general managing director of Domino's Pizza Enterprise and was succeeded by his sister Kerry Hayman, who had previously served as the company's chief operations officer.

== Awards ==
- Pizza International Manager of the Year - 1996
- Brisbane Lord Mayor's Channel 7 Business Person of the Year Awards 2015
- The Ernst & Young Australian Young Entrepreneur of the Year – 2004 and 2012
- Chairman's Award for Outstanding Leadership in the Domino's worldwide network - 2004
- Australian Institute of Management (AIM) Professional Manager of the Year 2004 (QLD)
- Included in Top 10 Australian CEOs list – 2013
- Lord Mayor's Business Award for Digital Champion – 2013
- Included in top 10 list of CEOs who deliver – 2015
- DPE first runner up in the Ferrier Hodgson Retail Growth Awards – 2015
- Listed as No. 4 on Business Insider's list of 100 Coolest People in Australian Tech - 2016
- Domino's named No. 20 on Forbes' Most Innovative Growth Companies - 2016
- Domino's inducted into Queensland Business Leaders Hall of Fame - 2018

== Personal life ==
Meij is married to second wife Jenny and resides in Brisbane, Queensland.
