= Brumby's =

Chain of retail bakeries

Brumby's Bakery
- Type: Subsidiary
- Industry: Retail
- Genre: Bakery
- Founded: 1975, Ashburton, Victoria
- Founder: Michael Sherlock was appointed Managing Director in 2000.
- Headquarters: Camberwell, Victoria
- Key people: Chairman Terry O’Dwyer; Director Michael Sherlock
- Number of employees: 3,501 (as of 2007)
- Parent: Retail Food Group
- Website: www.brumbys.com.au

Previous logo

Brumby's Bakery (commonly shortened to Brumby's) is a chain of Australian and New Zealand retail bakeries. The business began in 1975 as the Old Style Bread Centre in Ashburton, Victoria, a bakery chain started by Roger Gillespie, who later co-founded Bakers Delight. The chain adopted the Brumby's name as it expanded into Queensland and developed as a franchise system. It has been owned by Retail Food Group since 2007.

== History ==
Roger Gillespie opened the Old Style Bread Centre in Ashburton in 1975. The store is the predecessor of Brumby's and part of the same fresh-bread retailing movement that later produced Bakers Delight. The business later expanded into Queensland, where it took on the Brumby's branding, and became a franchise chain.

Brumby's was first listed on the Australian Stock Exchange's second board under Dancorp Limited in 1986. At this time, there were 43 franchised stores.

In 2000, after Dancorp had been placed into receivership, the franchise network of over 100 stores was bought by a cooperative of franchisees and in 2003, the chain was listed on the Bendigo Stock Exchange.

After several ownership changes, Brumby's was acquired by Retail Food Group in 2007. As of 2007, Brumby's Bakery has over 320 franchises throughout Australia and New Zealand, up from 280 in 2003. In New Zealand, the master franchise rights for Brumby's Bakeries and several other Retail Food Group brands were acquired by Café Coffee & Bakery Systems (NZ) Ltd in a transaction completed in January 2016.

In 2012 Brumby's Bakery Managing Director wrote an internal memo that suggested franchisees increase their prices and "let the carbon tax take the blame". The company subsequently apologised for the memo.

In August 2025, Retail Food Group said it was exploring options to sell Brumby's Bakery after reporting a statutory net loss for the 2025 financial year. The company also recorded a non-cash impairment related to Brumby's and said the brand no longer sat within its main growth priorities. QSR Media reported that Brumby's had 70 outlets in Australia at the time of the divestment announcement and that Retail Food Group said the brand remained profitable despite a long-term decline in outlets.

In February 2026, Retail Food Group said it had considered interest from multiple parties but would retain the Brumby's business, saying the available options were not in the best interests of shareholders, franchisees or employees at that time.

== Operations ==
Brumby's operates primarily through franchised bakeries. Inside Franchise Business reported in 2019 that franchisees received training in areas such as compliance, products, sales and marketing, and that new stores required bakery equipment and preparation areas to produce baked goods daily.

== See also ==
- List of bakeries
- List of brand name breads
- List of restaurant chains in Australia
